= 2021 in paleontology =

Paleontology or palaeontology is the study of prehistoric life forms on Earth through the examination of plant and animal fossils. This includes the study of body fossils, tracks (ichnites), burrows, cast-off parts, fossilised feces (coprolites), palynomorphs and chemical residues. Because humans have encountered fossils for millennia, paleontology has a long history both before and after becoming formalized as a science. This article records significant discoveries and events related to paleontology that occurred or were published in the year 2021.

== Flora ==
=== Fungi ===
==== New taxa ====
Name	Novelty	Status	Authors	Age	Type locality	Location	Notes	Images
Allocordyceps	Gen. et sp. nov	In press	Poinar & Maltier	Eocene	Baltic amber	Europe (Baltic Sea region)	A fungus belonging to the group Hypocreales and the family Clavicipitaceae. Genus includes new species A. baltica.	
Bleximothyrium	Gen. et sp. nov	Valid	Le Renard et al.	Early Cretaceous (Aptian)	Potomac Group	United States (Virginia)	A dothideomycete fly-speck fungus. Type species B. ostiolatum.	
Chaenothecopsis polissica	Sp. nov	Valid	Heluta & Sukhomlyn in Sukhomlyn et al.	Late Eocene	Rovno amber	Ukraine	A species of Chaenothecopsis.	
Columnomyces electri	Sp. nov	Valid	Haelewaters & Perreau in Perreau, Haelewaters & Tafforeau	Miocene	Dominican amber	Dominican Republic	A laboulbeniale fungus, parasitic on the beetle Proptomaphaginus alleni.	
Glomites oqoti	Sp. nov	In press	Lalica & Tomescu	Devonian (Emsian)	Battery Point Formation	Canada (Quebec)	Spores with affinities to the Glomeromycotina.	
Meliolinites scanicus	Sp. nov	In press	McLoughlin et al.	Late Cretaceous (Santonian–early Campanian)		Sweden	A member of the family Meliolaceae.	
Nyssopsora eocaenica	Sp. nov	Valid	Tykhonenko & Hayova in Tykhonenko et al.	Middle Eocene	Naibuchi Formation (Sakhalinian amber)	Russia (Sakhalin Oblast)	A member of Pucciniales.	
Rhizophydites	Gen. et sp. nov	Valid	Krings, Serbet & Harper	Early Devonian	Rhynie chert	United Kingdom	A Chytridiomycotan fungus. Type species R. matryoshkae.	
Stomatothyrium	Gen. et sp. nov	Valid	Le Renard et al.	Early Cretaceous (Aptian)	Potomac Group	United States (Virginia)	A member of Dothideomycetes. Genus includes new species S. placocentrum.	
Stomiopeltites ivoeensis	Sp. nov	In press	McLoughlin et al.	Late Cretaceous (Santonian–early Campanian)		Sweden	A member of the family Micropeltidaceae.	
Yongnicta	Gen. et sp. nov	In press	Tobias & Maslova in Xu et al.	Late Oligocene	Yongning Formation	China	A member of Ascomycota described on the basis of fungal fruiting bodies preserved on fossil tupelo endocarps. Genus includes new species Y. nyssae.	

=== Research ===
- Exceptionally preserved specimens of Tawuia, providing new information on the anatomy of this organism, are described from the Tonian Liulaobei and Shiwangzhuang formations (China) by Tang et al. (2021), who interpret Tawuia as a coenocytic eukaryote, possibly a macroalga.
- Microfossils which may represent early terrestrial fungi are described from the Ediacaran Doushantuo Formation (China) by Gan et al. (2021).
- A Rhynie chert fossil Mycokidstonia sphaerialoides, originally interpreted as an ascomycete, is reclassified as a member of Glomeromycota belonging to the family Ambisporaceae by Walker et al. (2021).
- Carboniferous organism Oochytrium lepidodendri, originally classified as a fungus, is reinterpreted as an oomycete by Strullu-Derrien et al. (2021).
- Probable fossils of multicellular eukaryotic macroalgae (possibly with a green algal affinity) are described from the Tonian Dolores Creek Formation in the Wernecke Mountains (Canada) by Maloney et al. (2021), who interpret these fossils as likely to be some of the few green algae and some of the largest macroscopic eukaryotes yet recognized in the early Neoproterozoic, indicating that eukaryotic algae colonized marine environments by the early Neoproterozoic.
- Fossil material of macroalgae, providing information on the early evolution of holdfast morphologies and attachment strategies of benthic macroalgae, is described from the Ediacaran Lantian biota and Miaohe biota (China) by Wang et al. (2021).

== Cnidarians ==
=== New taxa ===
Name	Novelty	Status	Authors	Age	Type locality	Country	Notes	Images
Agastophyllum parvum	Sp. nov	Valid	McLean	Devonian			A rugose coral belonging to family Cystiphyllidae.	
Ankhelasma canadense	Sp. nov	In press	Chwieduk	Carboniferous (Viséan)	Flett Formation	Canada	A rugose coral belonging to the group Stauriida and the family Zaphrentoididae.	
Apocladophyllia guigouensis	Sp. nov	Valid	Vasseur & Lathuilière	Early Jurassic (Pliensbachian)		Morocco	A stony coral belonging to the family Cladophylliidae.	
Apoplacophyllia asiatica	Sp. nov	Valid	Baron-Szabo	Early Cretaceous (Albian)	Langshan Formation	China	A stony coral belonging to the family Heterocoeniidae.	
Axosmilia amellagouensis	Sp. nov	Valid	Vasseur & Lathuilière	Early Jurassic (Pliensbachian)		Morocco	A stony coral belonging to the family Axosmiliidae.	
Balkhanomeandra	Gen. et sp. nov	Valid	Bugrova	Early Cretaceous		Azerbaijan; Turkmenistan	A stony coral belonging to the family Latomeandridae. The type species is B. roniewiczae.	
Calcariastraea	Gen. et comb. nov	Valid	McLean & Wright	Devonian		Australia	A rugose coral. The type species is "Phillipsastrea" currani Etheridge; genus also includes "P." speciosa Chapman, "P." maculosa Hill, "P." linearis Hill and "P." oculoides Hill.	
Cantabriastraea orourkei	Sp. nov	Valid	McLean & Wright				A rugose coral.	
Catenatus	Gen. et sp. nov	Valid	Carrera et al.	Ordovician (Floian–Darriwilian)	San Juan Formation	Argentina	A member of Octocorallia, possibly belonging to the group Alcyonacea. The type species is C. argentinus.	
Cladochonus nagatoensis	Sp. nov	Valid	Niko	Early Carboniferous		Japan	A tabulate coral.	
Columnocoenia falkenbergensis	Sp. nov	Valid	Baron-Szabo	Early Cretaceous (Aptian)	Schrattenkalk Formation	Germany; Romania	A stony coral.	
Confusaforma prima	Sp. nov	Valid	Löser in Löser et al.	Early Cretaceous (Valanginian)	Sierra del Pozo Formation	Spain	A coral belonging to the family Solenocoeniidae.	
Cordilleria	Gen. et comb. nov	Valid	Fedorowski, Bamber & Richards	Carboniferous (Mississippian)	Lower Rundle Group	Canada; United States	A rugose coral belonging to the group Stauriida and the family Lithostrotionidae. The type species is "Diphyphyllum" mutabile Kelly (1942); genus also includes "Lithostrotion" flexuosum Warren (1927), "Lithostrotion (Siphonodendron)" warreni Nelson (1960) and "Lithostrotion (Siphonodendron)" oculinum Sando (1963).	
Coryphyllia bicuneiformis	Sp. nov	Valid	Vasseur & Lathuilière	Early Jurassic (Pliensbachian)		Morocco	A stony coral belonging to the family Coryphylliidae.	
Coryphyllia capillaria	Sp. nov	Valid	Vasseur & Lathuilière	Early Jurassic (Pliensbachian)		France; Morocco	A stony coral belonging to the family Coryphylliidae.	
Crebriphyllum	Gen. et comb. et 3 sp. nov	Valid	McLean & Wright	Devonian		Australia	A rugose coral. The type species is "Phillipsastrea" callosa Hill; genus also includes new species C. duni, C. jelli and C. struszi.	
Cyathoclisia sukhensis	Sp. nov	Valid	Ohar & Denayer	Carboniferous (Viséan)		Ukraine	A rugose coral belonging to the family Aulophyllidae.	
Cystiphylloides calnanense	Sp. nov	Valid	McLean	Devonian			A rugose coral belonging to family Cystiphyllidae.	
Cystiphylloides tetsaense	Sp. nov	Valid	McLean	Devonian			A rugose coral belonging to family Cystiphyllidae.	
Cystiplasma curraense	Sp. nov	Valid	McLean	Devonian			A rugose coral belonging to family Cystiphyllidae.	
Decimoconularia	Gen. et sp. nov	Valid	Guo et al.	Cambrian Stage 2	Yanjiahe Formation	China	A hexangulaconulariid. Genus includes new species D. isofacialis.	
Digonophyllum clarkense	Sp. nov	Valid	McLean	Devonian			A rugose coral belonging to family Cystiphyllidae.	
Distichophyllia pauciseptata	Sp. nov	Valid	Vasseur & Lathuilière	Early Jurassic (Pliensbachian)		Morocco	A stony coral belonging to the family Reimaniphylliidae.	
Ekvasophyllum variabilis	Sp. nov	In press	Chwieduk	Carboniferous (Viséan)	Flett Formation	Canada	A rugose coral belonging to the group Stauriida and the family Ekvasophyllidae.	
Eopreverastrea	Gen. et sp. nov	Valid	Löser in Löser et al.	Early Cretaceous (Valanginian)	Sierra del Pozo Formation	Spain	A coral belonging to the family Aulastraeoporidae. The type species is E. llanoensis.	
Epismiliopsis paraeudesi	Sp. nov	Valid	Vasseur & Lathuilière	Early Jurassic (Pliensbachian)		Morocco	A stony coral belonging to the family Stylophyllidae.	
Favia misakiensis	Sp. nov	Valid	Niko & Suzuki	Miocene	Katsuta Group	Japan	A species of Favia.	
Floriastrea iberica	Sp. nov	Valid	Löser in Löser et al.	Early Cretaceous (Valanginian)	Sierra del Pozo Formation	Spain	A coral belonging to the family Actinastreidae.	
Fungiaphyllia praecursor	Sp. nov	Valid	Vasseur & Lathuilière	Early Jurassic (Pliensbachian)		Morocco	A stony coral belonging to the family Deltocyathiidae.	
Fungiaphyllia rotunda	Sp. nov	Valid	Vasseur & Lathuilière	Early Jurassic (Pliensbachian)		Morocco	A stony coral belonging to the family Deltocyathiidae.	
Gyrosmilia maltensis	Sp. nov	Valid	Saint Martin et al.	Oligocene (Chattian)	Lower Coralline Limestone	Malta	A species of Gyrosmilia.	
Julfamichelinia	Gen. et comb. nov	Valid	Niko & Badpa	Permian (Wuchiapingian)	Dzhulfa Formation	Afghanistan? Armenia; Azerbaijan; Iran	A tabulate coral belonging to the family Micheliniidae. The type species is "Michelinopora" allata Tchudinova in Ruzhentsev & Sarycheva (1965).	
Kluaphyllum	Gen. et sp. nov	Valid	McLean	Devonian			A rugose coral belonging to family Cystiphyllidae. Genus includes new species K. sulcatum.	
Lekanophyllum nordlingense	Sp. nov	Valid	McLean	Devonian			A rugose coral belonging to family Cystiphyllidae.	
Lekanophyllum robbense	Sp. nov	Valid	McLean	Devonian			A rugose coral belonging to family Cystiphyllidae.	
Loboplasma sutchersense	Sp. nov	Valid	McLean & Wright in McLean	Devonian			A rugose coral belonging to family Cystiphyllidae.	
Margarosmilia dividenda	Sp. nov	Valid	Vasseur & Lathuilière	Early Jurassic (Pliensbachian)		Morocco	A stony coral belonging to the family Margarophylliidae.	
Microplasma fromense	Sp. nov	Valid	McLean & Wright in McLean	Devonian			A rugose coral belonging to family Cystiphyllidae.	
Microplasma hedingeri	Sp. nov	Valid	McLean	Devonian			A rugose coral belonging to family Cystiphyllidae.	
Microplasma nabeschense	Sp. nov	Valid	McLean	Devonian			A rugose coral belonging to family Cystiphyllidae.	
Miophora naxxarensis	Sp. nov	Valid	Saint Martin et al.	Oligocene (Chattian)	Lower Coralline Limestone	Malta	A stony coral.	
Monopachyphyllia	Gen. et sp. nov	Valid	Kołodziej & Marian	Early Cretaceous (Aptian)		Romania	A colonial coral belonging to the group Pachythecaliina, possibly belonging to the superfamily Heterocoenioidea and the family Carolastraeidae. Genus includes new species M. roniewiczae.	
Nailiana	Gen. et sp. nov	Valid	Ou & Shu in Ou et al.	Cambrian Stage 3	Heilinpu Formation	China	An early anthozoan. The type species is N. elegans.	
Nardophyllum cavanense	Sp. nov	Valid	McLean	Devonian			A rugose coral belonging to family Cystiphyllidae.	
Nerthastraea maltensis	Sp. nov	Valid	Saint Martin et al.	Oligocene (Chattian)	Lower Coralline Limestone	Malta	A stony coral.	
Ogmophylloides	Gen. et sp. nov	Valid	McLean	Devonian			A rugose coral belonging to family Cystiphyllidae. Genus includes new species O. taylori.	
Palaeodiphasia	Gen et comb. nov	Valid	Song et al.	Late Cambrian	Fengshan Formation	China	A member of Leptothecata belonging to the group Macrocolonia; a new genus for "Siberiograptus" simplex Lin (1985).	
Paraconularia abagaensis	Sp. nov	In press	Min et al.	Permian		China	A conulariid.	
Paravolzeia calabrensis	Sp. nov	Valid	Vasseur & Lathuilière	Early Jurassic (Pliensbachian)		Italy	A stony coral belonging to the family Protoheterastraeidae.	
Phacelostylophyllum arbustulum	Sp. nov	Valid	Vasseur & Lathuilière	Early Jurassic (Pliensbachian)		France	A stony coral belonging to the family Stylophyllidae.	
Phillipsastrea chapmani	Sp. nov	Valid	McLean & Wright	Devonian (Pragian)		Australia	A rugose coral.	
Phillipsastrea mcraeorum	Sp. nov	Valid	McLean & Wright				A rugose coral.	
Phillipsastrea pedderi	Sp. nov	Valid	McLean & Wright				A rugose coral.	
Podosmilia	Gen. et sp. nov	Valid	Vasseur & Lathuilière	Early Jurassic (Pliensbachian)		France; Morocco	A stony coral belonging to the family Stylophyllidae. The type species is P. horologium.	
Prismastrea	Gen. et sp. nov	Valid	Vasseur & Lathuilière	Early Jurassic (Pliensbachian)		Morocco	A stony coral belonging to the family Thecosmiliidae. The type species is P. organum.	
Proleptophyllia calix	Sp. nov	Valid	Vasseur & Lathuilière	Early Jurassic (Pliensbachian)		Morocco	A stony coral belonging to the family Dermosmiliidae.	
Proleptophyllia magna	Sp. nov	Valid	Vasseur & Lathuilière	Early Jurassic (Pliensbachian)		Morocco	A stony coral belonging to the family Dermosmiliidae.	
Proleptophyllia subphaceloida	Sp. nov	Valid	Vasseur & Lathuilière	Early Jurassic (Pliensbachian)		Morocco	A stony coral belonging to the family Dermosmiliidae.	
Retiophyllia zizensis	Sp. nov	Valid	Vasseur & Lathuilière	Early Jurassic (Pliensbachian)	Aganane Formation	Morocco	A stony coral belonging to the family Reimaniphylliidae.	
Siderohelia	Gen. et sp. nov	Valid	Löser in Löser et al.	Cretaceous (Hauterivian to Santonian)		Spain	A stony coral belonging to the family Rhizangiidae. The type species is S. aquilai.	
Spongiocoenia	Gen. et comb. nov	Valid	Vasseur & Lathuilière	Early Jurassic (Sinemurian-Pliensbachian)		Spain	A stony coral of uncertain affinities. The type species is "Coccophyllum" liasicum Turnšek & Geyer in Turnšek, Seyfried & Geyer (1975).	
Stylophyllopsis bovista	Sp. nov	Valid	Vasseur & Lathuilière	Early Jurassic (Pliensbachian)		France	A stony coral belonging to the family Stylophyllidae.	
Stylophyllopsis veracolumella	Sp. nov	Valid	Vasseur & Lathuilière	Early Jurassic (Pliensbachian)		France	A stony coral belonging to the family Stylophyllidae.	
Sutherlandia khachikensis	Sp. nov	Valid	Niko & Badpa	Permian (Capitanian)	Khachik Formation	Iran	A tabulate coral belonging to the family Favositidae.	
Trigerastraea sikharulidzeae	Sp. nov	Valid	Baron-Szabo	Early Cretaceous (Albian)		France	A stony coral belonging to the family Latomeandridae.	
Tropalicystis	Gen. nov	Valid	McLean	Devonian			A rugose coral belonging to family Cystiphyllidae.	
Tubulosmilia	Gen. et sp. nov	Valid	Vasseur & Lathuilière	Early Jurassic (Pliensbachian)		Morocco	A stony coral belonging to the family Stylophyllidae. The type species is T. regularis.	
Variocystis	Gen. et sp. nov	Valid	McLean	Devonian			A rugose coral belonging to family Cystiphyllidae. Genus includes new species V. caribouensis.	

=== Research ===
- Anatomical evidence indicative of a close relationship between cloudinids and Cambrian animals with cnidarian affinities: Cambroctoconus, Lipopora and Tretocylichne is published by Park et al. (2021).
- A study on the morphology, embryonic development and phylogenetic relationships of Quadrapyrgites is published by Zhao et al. (2021), who interpret this taxon and its probable relative Olivooides as more likely to be diploblastic cnidarians than triploblastic cycloneuralians.
- An exceptionally preserved conulariid specimen, keeping its aperture semi-closed and making it possible to see most of the internal part of the closure with rib continuation inwards, is described from the Ordovician of southeastern Brandenburg (Germany) by Sendino & Bochmann (2021).
- Revision of Palaenigma wrangeli is published by Kröger et al. (2021), who argue that this organism can be best interpreted as a conulariid, and name a new family Palaenigmaidae.
- A study on the earliest growth stages and branching process in specimens of Oligophylloides from the Devonian (Famennian) of Morocco, and on the implications of these specimens for the knowledge of the phylogenetic relationships of Heterocorallia, is published by Berkowski et al. (2021).

== Bryozoans ==
=== New taxa ===
Name	Novelty	Status	Authors	Age	Type locality	Location	Notes	Images
Acoscinopleura beniamovski	Sp. nov	Valid	Koromyslova, Taylor & Pakhnevich	Late Cretaceous (Maastrichtian)		Kazakhstan	A cheilostome bryozoan.	
Antropora guajirensis	Sp. nov	Valid	Flórez, Di Martino & Ramalho	Early Miocene	Siamaná Formation	Colombia	A species of Antropora.	
Atoichos	Gen. et sp. nov	Valid	Flórez, Di Martino & Ramalho	Early Miocene	Siamaná Formation	Colombia	A member of the family Onychocellidae. The type species is A. magnus.	
Calpensia caribensis	Sp. nov	Valid	Flórez, Di Martino & Ramalho	Early Miocene	Siamaná Formation	Colombia	A member of the family Microporidae.	
Conopeum flumineum	Sp. nov	Valid	Taylor & Rogers	Late Cretaceous (Campanian)	Judith River Formation	United States (Montana)	A species of Conopeum.	
Cribrilaria multicostata	Sp. nov	Valid	Flórez, Di Martino & Ramalho	Early Miocene	Siamaná Formation	Colombia	A member of the family Cribrilinidae.	
Cribrilaria nixor	Sp. nov	Valid	Flórez, Di Martino & Ramalho	Early Miocene	Siamaná Formation	Colombia	A member of the family Cribrilinidae.	
Cycloavicularia	Gen. et sp. nov	Valid	Flórez, Di Martino & Ramalho	Early Miocene	Siamaná Formation	Colombia	A member of the family Teuchoporidae. The type species C. parva.	
Ditaxiporina colombiana	Sp. nov	Valid	Flórez, Di Martino & Ramalho	Early Miocene	Siamaná Formation	Colombia	A member of the family Catenicellidae.	
Escharifora? invisibilia	Sp. nov	Valid	Koromyslova, Taylor & Pakhnevich	Late Cretaceous (Maastrichtian)		Kazakhstan	A cheilostome bryozoan.	
Figularia bragai	Sp. nov	Valid	Flórez, Di Martino & Ramalho	Early Miocene	Siamaná Formation	Colombia		
Figularia elcanoi	Sp. nov	Valid	López-Gappa et al.	Early Miocene		Argentina	A member of Cheilostomatida.	
Gymnophorella	Gen. et sp. nov	Valid	Flórez, Di Martino & Ramalho	Early Miocene	Siamaná Formation	Colombia	A member of the family Steginoporellidae. The type species is G. hadra.	
Jolietina victoria	Sp. nov	Valid	López-Gappa et al.	Early Miocene		Argentina	A member of Cheilostomatida.	
Parafigularia pigafettai	Sp. nov	Valid	López-Gappa et al.	Early Miocene		Argentina	A member of Cheilostomatida.	
Poricella paulae	Sp. nov	Valid	Flórez, Di Martino & Ramalho	Early Miocene	Siamaná Formation	Colombia	A member of the family Arachnopusiidae.	

=== Research ===
- Protomelission gatehousei is reinterpreted as a potential stem-group bryozoan by Zhang et al. (2021).
- A study on the evolutionary history of cyclostome and cheilostome bryozoans over the past 150 million years, focusing on causes of cheilostome taxonomic richness surpassing the richness of once dominant cyclostomes, is published by Lidgard et al. (2021).

== Brachiopods ==
=== New taxa ===
Name	Novelty	Status	Authors	Age	Type locality	Location	Notes	Images
Alispiriferella turnbulli	Sp. nov	Valid	Waterhouse & Campbell	Permian		New Zealand	A member of Spiriferida belonging to the family Spiriferellidae.	
?Becscia pentagona	Sp. nov	Valid	Baarli		Solvik Formation	Norway		
Bellistrophia askarensis	Sp. nov	Valid	Popov & Nikitina in Popov et al.	Cambrian (Wuliuan)	Athei Formation	Kazakhstan	A kutorginide brachiopod.	
Carinagypa robecki	Sp. nov	Valid	Blodgett et al.	Devonian (Emsian)		United States (Alaska)	A member of Pentamerida belonging to the family Gypidulidae.	
Crinisarina pseudoglobularis	Sp. nov	Valid	Serobyan et al.	Devonian (Famennian)		Armenia	An athyride brachiopod.	
Eisaella	Gen. et sp. nov	Valid	Baarli		Solvik Formation	Norway	Genus includes new species E. uniplicata.	
Eoconulus tucunucoensis	Sp. nov	Valid	Lavié, Mestre & Carrera	Ordovician	San Juan Formation	Argentina	An acrotretid brachiopod.	
Ferronirhynchia	Gen. et sp. nov	Valid	García-Alcalde	Devonian (Emsian)	Moniello Formation	Spain	A member of Rhynchonellida belonging to the family Trigonirhynchiidae. The type species is F. pulgari.	
Grebneffia	Gen. et sp. nov	Valid	Waterhouse & Campbell	Permian	McLean Peaks Formation	New Zealand	A member of Terebratulida belonging to the family Dielasmidae. The type species is G. divaricata.	
Gypospirifer? inexpectans	Sp. nov	Valid	Waterhouse & Campbell	Permian		New Zealand	A member of Spiriferida belonging to the family Neospiriferidae.	
Ingelarella intrudus	Sp. nov	Valid	Waterhouse	Permian	Lakes Creek Formation	Australia	A member of Spiriferida belonging to the family Ingelarellidae.	
Kermanirhyncha	Gen. et sp. nov	Valid	Popov et al.	Silurian (Aeronian)	Shabdjereh Formation	Iran	A rhynchonellide brachiopod. Genus includes new species K. granulata.	
Levanispirifer	Gen. et sp. nov	Valid	Popov et al.	Silurian (Aeronian)	Shabdjereh Formation	Iran	A spiriferide brachiopod. Genus includes new species L. alatus.	
Longtancunella xiazhuangensis	Sp. nov	In press	Wang et al.	Cambrian Stage 3	Hongjingshao Formation	China		
Luthieria	Gen. et sp. nov	Valid	Lavié, Mestre & Carrera	Ordovician	San Juan Formation	Argentina	An obolid brachiopod. Genus includes new species L. diminuta.	
Mictospirifer obtusus	Sp. nov	Valid	Popov et al.	Silurian (Aeronian)	Shabdjereh Formation	Iran	A spiriferide brachiopod.	
Neilotreta lakeensis	Sp. nov	Valid	Waterhouse	Permian	Lakes Creek Formation	Australia	A member of member of Spiriferida belonging to the family Georginakingiidae.	
Orbiculoidea verum	Sp. nov	Valid	Masunaga & Shiino	Middle Permian	Hoso-o Formation	Japan		
Paterula (?) vasilievae	Sp. nov	Valid	Smirnova & Zhegallo	Devonian (Frasnian)		Russia	A member of Linguloidea belonging to the family Paterulidae.	
Protoanidanthus costata	Sp. nov	Valid	Waterhouse	Permian	Lakes Creek Formation	Australia	A member of Productida belonging to the superfamily Paucispiniferoidea and the family Anidanthidae.	
Pseudostrophalosia routi	Sp. nov	Valid	Waterhouse	Permian	Mangarewa Formation	New Zealand	A member of Productida belonging to the group Strophalosiidina and the family Dasyalosiidae.	
Psiloria karasuensis	Sp. nov	Valid	Popov & Nikitina in Popov et al.	Cambrian (Wuliuan)	Athei Formation	Kazakhstan	A protorthide brachiopod.	
Pteroplecta blakei	Sp. nov	Valid	Waterhouse	Permian	Lakes Creek Formation	Australia	A member of Spiriferida belonging to the superfamily Paeckelmanelloidea and the family Pterospiriferidae.	
Schellwienella clarkei	Sp. nov	Valid	Rezende & Isaacson	Devonian	Ponta Grossa Formation	Brazil	A member of Orthotetida.	
Sepkoskirhynchia	Gen. et sp. nov	In press	Radulović	Early Jurassic (Pliensbachian)	Seoca Lithiotis Limestone	Montenegro	A rhynchonellide brachiopod belonging to the family Basiliolidae. Genus includes new species S. sphaerica.	
Shelvothyris bivittata	Sp. nov	Valid	Baarli		Solvik Formation	Norway		
Terrakea densispinosa	Sp. nov	Valid	Waterhouse	Permian	Mangarewa Formation	New Zealand	A member of Productida belonging to the superfamily Proboscidelloidea and the family Paucispinauriidae.	
Thulatrypa huangi	Sp. nov	Valid	Baarli		Solvik Formation	Norway		
Thulatrypa vikenensis	Sp. nov	Valid	Baarli		Solvik Formation	Norway		
Xanastur	Nom. nov	Valid	García-Alcalde	Early Devonian		Spain	A terebratulid brachiopod; a replacement name for Xana García-Alcalde (1972).	
Xinjiangiproductus? junggarensis	Sp. nov	In press	Guo, Chen & Liao	Early Carboniferous	Hongshanzui Formation	China		

=== Research ===
- Revision and a study on the biogeography of brachiopod faunas from the Early Ordovician Mediterranean Province is published by Cocks & Popov (2021).
- A study on the evolution of the strophomenoid brachiopods, aiming to determine whether environmental changes at the time of the Great Ordovician Biodiversification Event correlated with the diversification of this group, is published by Congreve, Patzkowsky & Wagner (2021).
- A study on the selectivity of extinction of rhynchonelliform brachiopods from the Appalachian Foreland Basin during the two pulses of the Frasnian–Famennian mass extinction, aiming to determine the primary kill mechanism in this fauna, is published by Pier et al. (2021).
- A study on the phylogenetic relationships and evolutionary history of late Permian and Triassic rhynchonellides is published by Guo et al. (2021).

== Echinoderms ==
=== New taxa ===
Name	Novelty	Status	Authors	Age	Type locality	Country	Notes	Images
Amphoracrinus tenax	Sp. nov	Valid	Ausich et al.	Carboniferous (Viséan)	Borden Formation	United States (Kentucky)	A monobathrid camerate belonging to the family Amphoracrinidae.	
Archiacia ramitaensis	Sp. nov	Valid	Néraudeau & Mouty	Late Cretaceous (Cenomanian)		Syria	A sea urchin belonging to the family Archiaciidae.	
Barbaraster	Gen. et 2 sp. nov	Valid	Thuy & Numberger-Thuy	Early Jurassic (Toarcian)	Posidonia Shale	Luxembourg	A brittle star belonging to the group Ophiurida. The type species is B. colbachi; genus also includes B. muenzbergerae.	
Boxaster	Gen. et sp. nov	In press	Loba & Radwańska	Late Jurassic (Kimmeridgian)		Poland	A starfish belonging to the group Paxillosida, possibly a member of the family Astropectinidae. The type species is B. wapienensis.	
Bulbosphaeraster	Gen. et sp. nov	Valid	Gale	Middle Jurassic (Bathonian)		France	A starfish belonging to the family Sphaerasteridae. The type species is B. valettei.	
Calvaticrinus	Gen. et comb. nov	In press	Gale & Matrion	Early Cretaceous (Albian)		France; United Kingdom	A microcrinoid belonging to the family Roveacrinidae. The type species is "Plotocrinus" monocarinatus Destombes (1984); genus also includes C. subplanatus (Destombes, 1984) and "Discocrinus integer Hess (2010).	
Cantabrigiaster	Gen. et sp. nov	Disputed	Hunter & Ortega-Hernández	Early Ordovician	Fezouata Formation	Morocco	A somasteroid asterozoan. The type species is C. fezouataensis. Blake & Hotchkiss (2022) considered Cantabrigiaster to be a junior synonym of the chinianasterid genus Villebrunaster, though the authors maintained C. fezouataensis as a distinct species within the latter genus.	
Cherbonniericrinus requiensis	Sp. nov	Valid	Roux, Martinez & Vizcaïno	Eocene (Ypresian)		France	A crinoid belonging to the family Rhizocrinidae.	
Chomataster breizh	Sp. nov	Valid	Jagt et al.	Late Cretaceous (Campanian)	Spiennes Chalk Formation	Belgium	A starfish belonging to the family Goniasteridae.	
Chrispaulia spinosa	Sp. nov	Valid	Gale & Jagt	Early Cretaceous (Hauterivian)	Tealby Clay	Germany; United Kingdom	A starfish belonging to the order Paxillosida and the suborder Cribellina. Transferred to the genus Borszczia by Pauly & Villier (2025).	
Chrispaulia wrightorum	Sp. nov	Valid	Gale & Jagt	Early Cretaceous (Albian)	Hunstanton Formation	United Kingdom	A starfish belonging to the family Goniopectinidae.	
Costatocrinus fragilis	Sp. nov	In press	Gale	Late Cretaceous (Campanian)		United Kingdom	A crinoid.	
Dermacantha reolidi	Sp. nov	Valid	Thuy & Numberger-Thuy	Early Jurassic (Toarcian)	Posidonia Shale	Luxembourg	A brittle star belonging to the family Ophionereididae.	
Douglasicrinus	Gen. et sp. nov	In press	Gale	Late Cretaceous (Campanian)		United Kingdom	A crinoid. Genus includes new species D. alumensis.	
Echinosphaeraster	Gen. et comb. nov	Valid	Gale	Late Jurassic (Kimmeridgian)		Germany; Switzerland	A starfish belonging to the family Sphaerasteridae. The type species is "Asterias" scutatus Goldfuss (1833).	
Eosphaeraster	Gen. et sp. nov	Valid	Gale	Early Jurassic (Pliensbachian)		Morocco	A starfish belonging to the family Sphaerasteridae. The type species is E. amellagensis.	
Gastecrinus	Gen. et sp. nov	Valid	Roux & Philippe	Early Miocene		France	A stalked crinoid of uncertain phylogenetic placement. Genus includes new species G. vinealis.	
Gennaeocrinus tariatensis	Sp. nov	Valid	Waters & Ausich	Devonian (Emsian)	Tariat Formation	Mongolia	A monobathrid crinoid.	
Globator aegyptiaca	Sp. nov	In press	El Qot	Early Cretaceous (Albian)		Egypt	A sea urchin.	
Globulocrinus	Gen. et sp. nov	Valid	Roux, Martinez & Vizcaïno	Eocene (Ypresian)		France	A crinoid belonging to the family Rhizocrinidae. Genus includes new species G. amphoraformis.	
Halocrinites heinorum	Sp. nov	Valid	Bohatý & Ausich	Devonian (Eifelian–Givetian)		Germany	A crinoid belonging to the group Eucladida.	
Hessicrinus vectensis	Sp. nov	In press	Gale	Late Cretaceous (Campanian)		United Kingdom	A crinoid.	
Holopus plaziati	Sp. nov	Valid	Roux, Martinez & Vizcaïno	Eocene (Ypresian)		France	A crinoid belonging to the family Holopodidae.	
Hrabalicrinus	Gen. et sp. nov	Valid	Salamon & Płachno	Late Jurassic (Oxfordian)		Czech Republic	A comatulid crinoid. Genus includes new species H. zitti.	
Ikerus	Gen. et sp. nov	Valid	Jell & Sprinkle	Cambrian	Thorntonia Limestone	Australia	An edrioblastoid. Genus includes new species I. edgari	
Imagdacrinus	Gen. et sp. et comb. nov	Valid	Rozhnov	Silurian		Russia	A myelodactylid disparid crinoid. Genus includes new species I. minutus, as well as "Myelodactylus" flexibilis Stukalina (1982) and "Myelodactylus" rimatus Stukalina (2000).	
Inexpectacantha ullmanni	Sp. nov	Valid	Thuy & Numberger-Thuy	Early Jurassic (Toarcian)	Posidonia Shale	Luxembourg	A brittle star belonging to the group Euryophiurida.	
Jurapecten dhondtae	Sp. nov	Valid	Gale & Jagt	Late Cretaceous (Maastrichtian)	Maastricht Formation	Belgium	A starfish belonging to the family Benthopectinidae.	
Jurapecten infrajurensis	Sp. nov	Valid	Gale & Jagt	Jurassic (Toarcian–Aalenian)		France; Germany	A starfish belonging to the family Benthopectinidae.	
Kholokholnyacrinus	Gen. et sp. nov	Valid	Mirantsev	Carboniferous (Pennsylvanian)	Smedva Formation	Russia (Tver Oblast)	A cladid crinoid. Genus includes new species K. ilkhovskyi.	
Kunmingeocrinus	Gen. et sp. nov	In press	Zhao et al.	Cambrian Stage 4		China	A gogiid eocrinoid. Genus includes new species K. cupuliformis.	
Lapidaster hougardae	Sp. nov	Valid	Thuy & Numberger-Thuy	Early Jurassic (Toarcian)	Posidonia Shale	Luxembourg	A brittle star belonging to the group Ophioscolecida and the family Ophioscolecidae.	
Mooreocrinus liaoi	Sp. nov	In press	Mao & Li in Mao et al.	Carboniferous (Pennsylvanian)	Outangdi Formation	China	A cladid crinoid.	
Nafarroina	Gen. et sp. nov	Valid	Forner i Valls, Arbilla Karasatorre & Moreno Alcalde	Late Cretaceous (Coniacian)		Spain	A sea urchin belonging to the group Holasteroida and the family Stegasteridae. The type species is N. singularis.	
Nymphaster mudzborgh	Sp. nov	Valid	Jagt et al.	Late Cretaceous (Campanian)		Germany	A starfish belonging to the family Goniasteridae, a species of Nymphaster.	
Ophioduplantiera	Gen. et sp. nov	Valid	Thuy, Numberger-Thuy & Pineda-Enríquez	Early Jurassic (Sinemurian to Pliensbachian)	Adnet Formation	Austria	A brittle star belonging to the family Ophiuridae. The type species is O. noctiluca.	
Ophiogojira	Gen. et 3 sp. nov	Valid	Thuy, Numberger-Thuy & Pineda-Enríquez	Early Jurassic (Pliensbachian to Toarcian)	Aubange Formation	France; Luxembourg	A brittle star belonging to the group Ophiurina. The type species is O. labadiei Thuy, Numberger-Thuy & Pineda-Enríquez; genus also includes new species O. andreui Thuy, Numberger-Thuy & Pineda-Enríquez and O. aliorbis Thuy & Numberger-Thuy.	
Ophiomisidium pratchettae	Sp. nov	Valid	Thuy & Numberger-Thuy	Early Jurassic (Toarcian)	Posidonia Shale	Luxembourg	A brittle star belonging to the group Ophiurida and the family Astrophiuridae.	
Ophiomusa perezi	Sp. nov	Valid	Thuy & Numberger-Thuy	Early Jurassic (Toarcian)	Posidonia Shale	Luxembourg	A brittle star belonging to the group Ophiurida and the family Ophiomusaidae.	
Ophiosuperstes	Gen. et sp. nov	Valid	Thuy, Maxwell & Pruss	Early Triassic	Moenkopi Formation	United States (Nevada)	A brittle star belonging to the group Ophintegrida. The type species is O. praeparvus.	
Ophiotardis	Gen. et sp. et comb. nov	Valid	Thuy & Numberger-Thuy	Early Jurassic (Sinemurian-Toarcian)	Posidonia Shale; Jurensismergel Formation?; Luxembourg Sandstone Formation; Middle Lias Formation	France? Germany? Luxembourg; United Kingdom	A brittle star belonging to the group Ophiurida and the family Ophiopyrgidae. The type species is O. tennanti; genus also includes "Ophiura" astonensis Hess (1964).	
Palaeocoma kortei	Sp. nov	Valid	Thuy & Numberger-Thuy	Early Jurassic (Toarcian)	Posidonia Shale	Luxembourg	A brittle star belonging to the group Ophiurida and the family Ophiopyrgidae.	
Papacrinus	Gen. et sp. nov	Valid	Roux & Philippe	Early Miocene		France	A stalked crinoid belonging to the family Balanocrininae. Genus includes new species P. avignonensis.	
Paraconocrinus rhodanicus	Sp. nov	Valid	Roux & Philippe	Early Miocene		France	A stalked crinoid belonging to the family Rhizocrinidae.	
Perikefalea	Gen. et 2 sp. nov	Valid	Lefebvre & Ausich	Silurian?-Devonian	Santa Rosa Formation	Bolivia; Canada?	A mitrate. Genus includes new species P. racheboeufi and possibly P? cybeleae	
Pouzaster	Gen. et sp. nov	Valid	Gale	Jurassic (Toarcian to Bathonian)		France	A starfish belonging to the family Sphaerasteridae. The type species is P. pocknotata.	
Pseudobystrowicrinus	Gen. et sp. nov	Valid	Donovan, Deckers & Jagt	Devonian		United Kingdom	A crinoid columnal. The type species is P. fionae.	
Pseudoconocrinus lavadensis	Sp. nov	Valid	Roux, Martinez & Vizcaïno	Eocene (Ypresian)		France	A crinoid belonging to the family Rhizocrinidae. Originally described as a species of Pseudoconocrinus; transferred to the genus Lessinicrinus by Manni (2022).	
Pseudodiplocidaris	Gen. et comb. nov	Disputed	Hostettler et al.	Late Jurassic (Oxfordian)	St-Ursanne Formation	Switzerland	A sea urchin belonging to the group Cidaroida and the family Diplocidaridae. The type species is "Diplocidaris" bernasconii Bischof, Hostettler & Menkveld-Gfeller (2018). Vadet & Nicolleau (2023) considered Pseudodiplocidaris to be a junior synonym of the genus Rolliericidaris, an assigned "D." bernasconii to the latter genus.	
Punkaster	Gen. et 2 sp. nov	Valid	Gale & Jagt	Late Cretaceous	Tor Formation	Belgium; Czech Republic; Denmark; Germany; United Kingdom	A starfish belonging to the family Benthopectinidae. The type species is P. spinifera; genus also includes P. ruegenensis.	
Rugosphaeraster	Gen. et sp. nov	Valid	Gale	Late Cretaceous (Campanian and Maastrichtian)		Germany; Sweden	A starfish belonging to the family Sphaerasteridae. The type species is R. ruegenensis.	
Sagittacrinus rotundacutus	Sp. nov	In press	Gale	Late Cretaceous (Campanian)		United Kingdom	A crinoid.	
Scolechinus sossanensis	Sp. nov	Valid	Borghi, Bottazzi & Caporiondo	Eocene (Priabonian)		Italy	A sea urchin belongint to the family Trigonocidaridae.	
Sidericrinus (col.) plymouthensis	Sp. nov	Valid	Donovan & Fearnhead	Early Devonian		United Kingdom	A crinoid.	
Sinaiosalenia	Gen. et sp. nov	In press	El Qot	Late Cretaceous (Cenomanian)		Egypt	A sea urchin. Genus includes new species S. rhombohedralis.	
Sinosura dieschbourgae	Sp. nov	Valid	Thuy & Numberger-Thuy	Early Jurassic (Toarcian)	Posidonia Shale	Luxembourg	A brittle star belonging to the group Ophioscolecida and the family Ophioleucidae.	
Thanataster	Gen. et sp. et comb. nov	Valid	Thuy & Numberger-Thuy	Early Jurassic (Sinemurian to Toarcian)	Posidonia Shale; Luxembourg Sandstone Formation	Luxembourg	A brittle star belonging to the group Ophiurida. The type species is T. desdemonia; genus also includes "Ophiomusium" sinemurensis Kutscher & Hary (1991).	
Thorntonites	Gen. et sp. nov	Valid	Jell & Sprinkle	Cambrian	Thorntonia Limestone	Australia	A stalked eocrinoid. Genus includes new species T. dowlingi	
Tiburtocrinus	Gen. et sp. nov	Valid	Manni & Di Nardo	Early Jurassic (Toarcian)	Corniola Formation	Italy	A crinoid belonging to the group Isocrinida and the family Paracomatulidae. The type species is T. toarcensis.	
Trecrinus	Gen. et sp. nov	Valid	Semenov et al.	Ordovician (Darriwilian)		Russia	A hybocrinid crinoid. Genus includes new species T. schmidti.	
Valettaster planus	Sp. nov	In press	Loba & Radwańska	Late Jurassic (Kimmeridgian)		Poland	A starfish belonging to the family Sphaerasteridae.	
Valettaster thuyi	Sp. nov	Valid	Gale	Early Jurassic (Toarcian)		France	A starfish belonging to the family Sphaerasteridae.	
Valimocrinus	Gen. et sp. nov	Valid	Rozhnov	Ordovician		Russia (Leningrad Oblast)	A crinoid, possibly a myelodactylid disparid. Genus includes new species V. terentyevi	
Zoroaster marambioensis	Sp. nov	Valid	Palópolo et al.	Eocene	La Meseta Formation	Antarctica	A starfish belonging to the family Zoroasteridae.	
Zuravlicrinus	Gen. et sp. nov	Valid	Rozhnov	Silurian		Russia	A crinoid, possibly a myelodactylid disparid. Genus includes new species Z. milicinae	

=== Research ===
- Fossil material of Dendrocystites belonging or related to the species D. sedgwicki is described from the Ordovician Lower Ktaoua Formation (Morocco) by Nohejlová & Lefebvre (2021), representing the first record of Soluta from Morocco and Africa in general reported to date.
- A study on the anatomy of Glyptosphaerites is published by Paul & Toom (2021).
- Redescription of the anatomy of Cystoblastus, and a study on the phylogenetic relationships of glyptocystitoids and hemicosmitoids, is published by Paul & Toom (2021).
- A study on the functional efficiency of hydrospires of blastoids, evaluating their potential significance for longer survival of blastoids than other blastozoan echinoderms, is published by Paul (2021).
- A study on extinction selectivity and changes in taxonomic, morphological and ecological diversity of diplobathrid crinoids throughout their evolutionary history is published by Cole & Hopkins (2021).
- A brittle star specimen (belonging to the group Oegophiurida and probably to the genus Protaster) preserving the body cavity in three dimensions and soft tissues, including the tube feet and internal structures, is described from the Silurian Herefordshire Lagerstätte (United Kingdom) by Carter et al. (2021).

== Conodonts ==
=== New taxa ===
Name	Novelty	Status	Authors	Age	Type locality	Country	Notes	Images
Ancyrogondolella? bohorensis	Sp. nov	Valid	Karádi et al.	Late Triassic (Norian)		Slovenia	A member of the family Gondolellidae.	
Ancyrogondolella goldingi	Sp. nov	Valid	Karádi et al.	Late Triassic (Norian)		Slovenia	A member of the family Gondolellidae.	
Apsidognathus yanbianensis	Sp. nov	Valid	Yan & Wu	Silurian		China		
Borinella? curvata	Sp. nov	In press	Orchard	Early Triassic (Olenekian)		Canada (British Columbia)		
Carbogondolella	Gen. nov	Valid	Golding & Orchard	Carboniferous (Pennsylvanian)			A member of family Gondolellidae.	
Caudicriodus anitae	Sp. nov	Valid	Barrick, Sundgren & McAdams	Devonian (Lochkovian)		United States		
Caudicriodus murphyi	Sp. nov	Valid	Barrick, Sundgren & McAdams	Devonian (Lochkovian)		United States		
Columbitella brevis	Sp. nov	In press	Orchard	Early Triassic (Olenekian)		Canada (British Columbia)		
Columbitella talpa	Sp. nov	In press	Golding	Early Triassic (Olenekian)		Canada (British Columbia)		
Columbitella weitschati	Sp. nov	In press	Orchard	Early Triassic (Olenekian)		United States (Idaho)		
Declinognathodus benedictus	Sp. nov	Valid	Golding & Orchard	Carboniferous		Canada (British Columbia)		
Dollymae peregrina	Sp. nov	In press	Świś	Devonian (Famennian)		Poland		
Drepanoistodus iommii	Sp. nov	Valid	Rasmussen, Eriksson & Lindskog	Middle Ordovician	Lynna Formation	Russia	A member of Protopanderodontida belonging to the family Drepanoistodontidae.	
Drepanoistodus svendi	Sp. nov	Valid	Rasmussen, Eriksson & Lindskog	Middle Ordovician	Volkhov Formation	Russia	A member of Protopanderodontida belonging to the family Drepanoistodontidae.	
Drepanoistodus viirae	Sp. nov	Valid	Rasmussen, Eriksson & Lindskog	Middle Ordovician	Sillaoru Formation	Russia	A member of Protopanderodontida belonging to the family Drepanoistodontidae.	
Epigondolella buseri	Sp. nov	Valid	Karádi et al.	Late Triassic (Norian)		Slovenia	A member of the family Gondolellidae.	
Epigondolella kozjanskoensis	Sp. nov	Valid	Karádi et al.	Late Triassic (Norian)		Slovenia	A member of the family Gondolellidae.	
Epigondolella ritae	Sp. nov	Valid	Karádi et al.	Late Triassic (Norian)		Austria; Slovenia	A member of the family Gondolellidae.	
Epigondolella senovoensis	Sp. nov	Valid	Karádi et al.	Late Triassic (Norian)		Slovenia	A member of the family Gondolellidae.	
Epigondolella slovenica	Sp. nov	Valid	Karádi et al.	Late Triassic (Norian)		Slovenia	A member of the family Gondolellidae.	
Guangxidella minuta	Sp. nov	Valid	Maekawa & Jenks	Early Triassic (Olenekian)	Thaynes Group	United States (Nevada)		
Idiognathodus coffeyvillensis	Sp. nov	Valid	Rosscoe & Barrick	Carboniferous (Kasimovian)	Atrasado Formation	United States (New Mexico; Oklahoma)		
Idiognathodus grubbsi	Sp. nov	Valid	Golding & Orchard			Canada (British Columbia)		
Idiognathodus kinneyensis	Sp. nov	Valid	Rosscoe & Barrick	Carboniferous (Kasimovian)	Atrasado Formation	United States (New Mexico)		
Magnigondolella acuminata	Sp. nov	In press	Orchard	Early Triassic (Olenekian)		Canada (British Columbia)		
Magnigondolella incurva	Sp. nov	In press	Orchard	Early Triassic (Olenekian)		Canada (British Columbia)		
Magnigondolella? minuta	Sp. nov	In press	Orchard	Early Triassic (Olenekian)		United States (Nevada)		
Magnigondolella mutata	Sp. nov	In press	Orchard & Goudemand in Orchard	Early Triassic (Olenekian)		United States (California)		
Magnigondolella peribola	Sp. nov	In press	Orchard & Golding in Orchard	Early Triassic (Olenekian)		Canada (British Columbia)		
Magnigondolella tozeri	Sp. nov	In press	Orchard	Early Triassic (Olenekian)		Canada (British Columbia)		
Magnigondolella trutchensis	Sp. nov	In press	Orchard	Early Triassic (Olenekian)		Canada (British Columbia)		
Mesogondolella qiangtangensis	Sp. nov	In press	Yuan et al.	Permian (Kungurian)	Lugu Formation	China		
Mosherella longnanensis	Sp. nov	Valid	Li & Lai in Li et al.	Late Triassic (Carnian)	Dengdengqiao Formation	China		
Neognathodus brulensis	Sp. nov	Valid	Golding & Orchard	Carboniferous		Canada (British Columbia)		
Neogondolella bucheri	Sp. nov	In press	Orchard	Early Triassic (Olenekian)		United States (Nevada)		
Neogondolella darwinensis	Sp. nov	In press	Orchard & Goudemand in Orchard	Early Triassic (Olenekian)		United States (California)		
Neogondolella gradinarui	Sp. nov	Valid	Golding & Orchard in Golding	Middle Triassic (Anisian)		China; Romania		
Neogondolella praeacuta	Sp. nov	In press	Orchard & Goudemand in Orchard	Early Triassic (Olenekian)		United States (California)		
Neogondolella sinuosa	Sp. nov	In press	Orchard & Goudemand in Orchard	Early Triassic (Olenekian)		United States (California)		
Neogondolella spathiconstricta	Sp. nov	In press	Orchard	Early Triassic (Olenekian)		United States (Nevada)		
Norigondolella imperfecta	Sp. nov	Valid	Golding & Orchard			Canada (British Columbia)		
Ozarkodina huenickeni	Sp. nov	In press	Gómez et al.	Silurian (Ludfordian) to Devonian (Lochkovian)	Los Espejos Formation	Argentina		
Paragondolella ebruae	Sp. nov	Valid	Kılıç	Middle Triassic (Anisian)		Turkey		
Paragondolella hirschii	Sp. nov	Valid	Kılıç & Budurov in Kılıç	Middle Triassic (Anisian)		Turkey		
Paragondolella nyoromo	Sp. nov	Valid	Golding & Orchard			Canada (British Columbia)		
Paragondolella praecornuta	Sp. nov	Valid	Kılıç et al. in Kılıç	Middle Triassic (Anisian)		Turkey		
Parvigondolella ciarapicae	Sp. nov	Valid	Rigo & Du in Du et al.	Late Triassic (Norian and Rhaetian)	Gabbs Formation; San Hipolito Formation; Scillato Formation	Hungary; Italy; Mexico; United States (Nevada)		
Pelekysgnathus soarae	Sp. nov	Valid	Over et al.	Devonian–Carboniferous transition	Dyer Formation	United States (Colorado)		
Praeicriodus simpsoni	Sp. nov	Valid	Barrick, Sundgren & McAdams	Silurian (Ludlow–Pridoli)		Australia		
Pseudosweetognathus accensus	Sp. nov	Valid	Golding & Orchard	Permian		Canada (British Columbia)		
Tasmanognathus coronatus	Sp. nov	Valid	Yang et al.	Ordovician (Katian)		China		

=== Research ===
- A study aiming to resolve the nature, porosity and permeability of conodont white matter is published by Atakul-Özdemir et al. (2021).
- A study aiming to determine feeding behavior, growth patterns and possible changes of feeding behavior during ontogeny in Proconodontus muelleri and Panderodus equicostatus is published by Leonhard et al. (2021).
- An exceptionally preserved specimen of Panderodus unicostatus is described from the Waukesha Lagerstätte (Wisconsin, United States) by Murdock & Smith (2021), who evaluate the implications of this specimen for the knowledge of the homology within conodont feeding apparatuses and body anatomy of primitive conodonts, and interpret P. unicostatus as a macrophagous predator.
- A study on the phylogenetic relationships of Early Triassic conodonts is published by Bai et al. (2021).
- Han et al. (2021) reconstruct ontogenetic series for seven stratigraphically important Early Triassic conodont species, on the basis of fossil material from the Salt Range and Surghar Range (Pakistan), and study the phylogenetic relationships among these taxa.

== Amphibians ==
=== New taxa ===
Name	Novelty	Status	Authors	Age	Type locality	Location	Notes	Images
Bermanerpeton	Gen. et sp. nov	Valid	Werneburg, Schneider & Lucas	Carboniferous (Kasimovian)	Atrasado Formation	United States (New Mexico)	A dvinosauroid temnospondyl. The type species is B. kinneyi.	
Euronecturus	Gen. et sp. nov	Valid	Macaluso, Villa & Mörs	Miocene	Ville Formation	Germany	A proteid salamander. The type species is E. grogu.	
Joermungandr	Gen. et sp. nov	Valid	Mann, Calthorpe & Maddin	Carboniferous (Moscovian)	Mazon Creek fossil beds	United States (Illinois)	A member of Recumbirostra. The type species is J. bolti.	
Laosuchus hun	Sp. nov	Valid	Liu & Chen	Late Permian	Naobaogou	China	A chroniosuchian.	
Leiopelma bishopi	Sp. nov	Valid	Easton, Tennyson & Rawlence	Late Pliocene (Waipipian–Mangapanian)	Kowai Formation	New Zealand	A species of Leiopelma.	
Neimengtriton	Gen. et comb. nov		Jia, Anderson & Gao	Middle Jurassic (Bathonian)	Haifanggou Formation	China	A stem-hynobiid salamander; a new genus for "Liaoxitriton" daohugouensis.	
Palaeobatrachus codreavladi	Sp. nov	Valid	Roček, Rage & Venczel	Miocene		Romania		
Palaeobatrachus minutus	Sp. nov	Valid	Roček, Rage & Venczel					
Primaevorana	Gen. et sp. nov	Valid	Moura et al.	Early Cretaceous (Aptian)	Crato Formation	Brazil	A frog belonging to the suborder Neobatrachia. The type species is P. cratensis	
Rocekophryne	Gen. et sp. nov	Valid	Rage et al.	Eocene		Algeria	A frog belonging to the group Ranoidea. The type species is R. ornata.	
Sclerocephalus concordiae	Sp. nov	Valid	Schoch & Sobral			Germany		
Thoosuchus abbasovi	Sp. nov	Valid	Novikov	Early Triassic		Russia		

=== Research ===
- A study on the function and evolution of forelimbs of early tetrapods, based on data from three-dimensional models of bones and muscles of forelimbs of Eusthenopteron foordi, Acanthostega gunnari and Pederpes finneyae, is published by Molnar et al. (2021).
- A study on the evolutionary dynamics of early tetrapods and their closest fish relatives is published by Simões & Pierce (2021).
- A study on the anatomy of the skull of Whatcheeria deltae is published by Rawson et al. (2021).
- Description of the anatomy of the postcranial skeleton of Whatcheeria deltae is published by Otoo et al. (2021).
- A study on the femoral bone histology of Greererpeton, and on its implications for the knowledge of the life history of this tetrapod, is published by Whitney & Pierce (2021).
- A study on the locomotor capabilities of tetrapods from the earliest Carboniferous Blue Beach site (Nova Scotia, Canada) is published by Lennie et al. (2021).
- A study on the early evolution of long bone elongation and bone marrow in tetrapods, based on data from temnospondyls (Apateon and Metoposaurus) and seymouriamorphs (Seymouria and Discosauriscus), is published by Estefa et al. (2021), who find the terrestrial Permian seymouriamorphs to be the oldest known tetrapods exhibiting a centralized marrow organization of long bones (which allows production of blood cells as in extant amniotes), and argue that the migration of blood-cell production in long bones probably wasn't an exaptation predating the water-to-land transition.
- A study on the skeletal anatomy of the holotype specimen of Ichthyerpeton bradleyae is published by Ó Gogáin & Wyse Jackson (2021).
- A study on the relations between vertebral shape and terrestriality in the evolution of temnospondyls is published by Carter et al. (2021).
- Description of new fossil material of temnospondyls from the Triassic of the Ruhuhu and Luangwa basins (Tanzania and Zambia), providing new information on the diversity of Triassic African temnospondyls and their recovery after the Permian–Triassic extinction event, is published by Steyer et al. (2021).
- A study on the morphological changes in the skeleton of Onchiodon labyrinthicus during its ontogeny, on the phylogenetic relationships of eryopids, and on the evolution of the life cycle in eryopids is published by Schoch (2021).
- A study on the anatomy and phylogenetic relationships of "Cheliderpeton" lellbachae is published by Schoch (2021), who transfers this species to the genus Glanochthon in the family Sclerocephalidae.
- A study on the histology of different-sized femora and vertebra of specimens of Platyoposaurus stuckenbergi is published by Uliakhin, Skutschas & Saburov (2021).
- Redescription of the holotype of Cryobatrachus kitchingi is published by Gee, Makovicky & Sidor (2021), who interpret this specimen as more likely to be the juvenile of an indeterminate capitosaur than a lydekkerinid, and who also describe partial temnospondyl skull from the lower Fremouw Formation (Antarctica), provisionally referred to Lydekkerinidae.
- A study on the anatomy and phylogenetic relationships of Tertrema acuta is published by Slodownik, Mörs & Kear (2021).
- Redescription of the metoposaurid fossil material from the Upper Triassic Zions View locality (New Oxford Formation; Pennsylvania, United States) is published by Gee & Jasinski (2021), who assign this material to the species Anaschisma browni, expanding known geographic range of this taxon.
- Redescription of the holotype specimens of Borborophagus wyomingensis and Koskinonodon princeps, and a reassessment of their synonymy with Anaschisma browni, is published by Kufner & Gee (2021).
- A study on the histology of the mandible of Metoposaurus krasiejowensis is published by Gruntmejer, Bodzioch & Konietzko-Meier (2021).
- A study on the anatomy and phylogenetic relationships of Timonya anneae and Procuhy nazariensis is published by Marsicano et al. (2021).
- A study on the anatomy and phylogenetic relationships of Macrerpeton huxleyi is published by Schoch & Milner (2021).
- A study on the phylogenetic relationships of dissorophid temnospondyls is published by Gee (2021).
- Description of a new specimen of Conjunctio from the Permian Cutler Formation (Colorado, United States), and a study on the phylogenetic relationships of this genus, is published by Gee et al. (2021).
- New fossil material of Micropholis stowi, expanding known geographic range of this species, is described from the lower Fremouw Formation (Halfmoon Bluff, Antarctica) by Gee & Sidor (2021).
- New early adult specimen of Milnererpeton huberi, providing new information on the ontogenetic development of amphibamiform temnospondyls, is described from the Carboniferous (Kasimovian) Atrasado Formation (New Mexico, United States) by Werneburg, Schneider & Lucas (2021).
- A study on the skeletal anatomy of Apateon dracyiensis, the anatomical variation in the fossil material of this species, and on its ontogeny, is published by Werneburg (2021).
- A study on the anatomy and development of the wrist of Genibatrachus is published by Roček et al. (2021).
- An early Campanian assemblage of anuran bones, suggestive of high local species richness of frogs, is described from the Aguja Formation (Texas, United States) by Wick (2021).
- Fossil material of Late Cretaceous frogs, including fossils of calyptocephalellid frogs and the southernmost record of pipids (Kuruleufenia) worldwide reported to date, is described from the Campanian–Maastrichtian assemblages from Chilean and Argentinean Patagonia (Dorotea, Allen and Los Alamitos formations) by Suazo Lara & Gómez (2021).
- Description of new pipimorph fossil material from the Cenomanian Candeleros Formation (Argentina), and a study on the implications of these fossils for the knowledge of the formation of the sacrum in pipimorphs throughout their evolutionary history, is published by Báez, Muzzopappa & Araújo (2021).
- Description of new fossil material of Hungarobatrachus szukacsi from the Upper Cretaceous (Santonian) Csehbánya Formation (Hungary), and a study on the anatomy and phylogenetic relationships of this species, is published by Venczel, Szentesi & Gardner (2021).
- Revision of the fossil record of the family Ceratophryidae is published by Gómez & Turazzini (2021).
- Redescription and a study on the phylogenetic relationships of Bufo servatus is published by Lemierre et al. (2021), who interpret this species as a senior synonym of Thaumastosaurus gezei (resulting in new combination Thaumastosaurus servatus), and assign it to the family Pyxicephalidae.
- Revision of the fossil material of Mesozoic temnospondyls and anurans housed in the collections of the Sirindhorn Museum and the Palaeontological Research and Education Centre of Mahasarakham University (Thailand), including fossils of brachyopids resembling the Chinese forms, is published by Nonsrirach, Manitkoon & Lauprasert (2021).
- Redescription of Nannaroter mckinziei, based on data from the holotype and from a new specimen from the Richards Spur locality (Oklahoma, United States), is published by MacDougall et al. (2021).
- A study aiming to determine plausible body postures and locomotion of Orobates pabsti is published by Zwafing et al. (2021).
- A study on the anatomy of the braincase and inner ear of Limnoscelis dynatis is published by Klembara et al. (2021).

== Synapsids ==
=== Non-mammalian synapsids ===
==== New taxa ====
Name	Novelty	Status	Authors	Age	Type locality	Country	Notes	Images
Acratophorus	Gen. et comb. nov	Valid	Kammerer & Ordoñez	Middle Triassic (Anisian)?	Río Seco de la Quebrada	Argentina	A kannemeyeriid dicynodont, the type species is "Kannemeyeria" argentinensis.	
Borealestes cuillinensis	Sp. nov	Valid	Panciroli et al.	Middle Jurassic (Bathonian)	Kilmaluag Formation	United Kingdom	A docodont.	B. cuillinensis (bottom, blue)
Dobunnodon	Gen. et comb. nov	Valid	Panciroli et al.	Middle Jurassic (Bathonian)	Forest Marble Formation	United Kingdom	A docodont; a new genus for "Borealestes" mussettae Sigogneau−Russell (2003).	
Fossiomanus	Gen. et sp. nov	Valid	Mao et al.	Early Cretaceous (Aptian)	Jiufotang Formation	China	A cynodont belonging to the family Tritylodontidae. Genus includes new species F. sinensis.	
Impidens	Gen. et sp. nov	Valid	Tolchard et al.	Middle Triassic	Cynognathus Assemblage Zone	Antarctica; South Africa	A gomphodont cynodont. Genus includes new species I. hancoxi.	
Isengops	Gen. et sp. nov		Sidor, Tabor & Smith	Late Permian	Madumabisa Mudstone	Zambia	A burnetiamorph biarmosuchian. Genus includes new species I. luangwensis.	
Kannemeyeria aganosteus	Sp. nov	Valid	Kammerer & Ordoñez	Middle Triassic (Anisian)?	Quebrada de los Fósiles	Argentina	A species of Kannemeyeria.	
Mobaceras	Gen. et sp. nov	Valid	Kammerer & Sidor	Middle Permian	Madumabisa Mudstone	Zambia	A burnetiid therapsid. The type species is M. zambeziense.	
Shashajaia	Gen. et sp. nov		Huttenlocker et al.	Carboniferous (Gzhelian)	Halgaito Formation	United States (Utah)	An early member of Sphenacodontia. The type species is S. bermani.	
Turfanodon jiufengensis	Sp. nov	Valid	Liu	Late Permian	Naobaogou Formation	China	A dicynodontoid dicynodont.	

==== Research ====
- A study comparing species richness of synapsids and reptiles during the Pennsylvanian and Cisuralian, evaluating the impact of the preservation biases, the effect of Lagerstätten, and contested phylogenetic placement of late Carboniferous and early Permian tetrapods on estimates of relative diversity patterns of synapsids and reptiles, is published by Brocklehurst (2021), who interprets his findings as challenging the assumption that synapsids dominated during the Pennsylvanian and Cisuralian.
- A study on the evolution of the vertebral column in synapsids is published by Jones et al. (2021), who interpret their findings as refuting the idea that the transition from non-mammalian synapsids to mammals involved a shift from reptile-like lateral bending of the backbone to sagittal bending, and argue that non-mammalian synapsids were characterized by their own unique functional regime of the vertebral column, distinct from that of extant reptiles and amphibians.
- A study comparing the forelimb morphology in extant mammals and fossil non-mammalian synapsids, aiming to determine whether extant mammals are good ecomorphological analogues for extinct synapsids, whether examples of ecomorphological convergence can be found among synapsids, and whether evolutionary history determined available functional solutions in synapsid forelimbs, is published by Lungmus & Angielczyk (2021).
- A study aiming to determine when major shifts in shoulder joint function and a shift from sprawling to parasagittal posture occurred during synapsid evolution, based on relationships between shoulder joint morphology, mobility, and muscle function in extant Argentine black and white tegu, short-beaked echidna and Virginia opossum, as well as on data on anatomical transformations preserved in the fossil record, is published by Brocklehurst et al. (2021).
- A study aiming to determine the index of blood flow into the femora of non-mammalian synapsids, and using it to determine the maximum metabolic rate of these synapsids, is published by Knaus et al. (2021), who interpret their findings as indicating that aerobic capacity was elevated in non-therapsid synapsids above the level of most recent non-varanid lepidosaurs, turtles and crocodilians since the late Carboniferous, with maximum aerobic metabolic rates at, or above, the level of varanids.
- Matamales-Andreu et al. (2021) describe probable caseid tracks from the lower Permian of Mallorca (Spain), and evaluate the implications of these tracks for the knowledge of the locomotion of early synapsids.
- A study comparing the morphology of the maxillary canal of Heleosaurus scholtzi, Varanosaurus acutrostris, Orovenator mayorum and Prolacerta broomi, and evaluating the implications of the morphology of the maxillary canal for the knowledge of the phylogenetic placement of varanopids, is published by Benoit et al. (2021).
- A study on the neurosensory anatomy of varanopids is published by Bazzana et al. (2021).
- A study on the skeletal anatomy and phylogenetic relationships of Raranimus dashankouensis is published by Duhamel et al. (2021).
- A study on the ontogenetic variation in the anatomy of the skulls of biarmosuchians, based on data from skulls of juvenile specimens, is published by Duhamel et al. (2021).
- A study on the paleoneurology and likely paleobiology of Anteosaurus magnificus is published by Benoit et al. (2021).
- A study on bone architecture and histology in two species of Anteosaurus from the Tapinocephalus Assemblage Zone of the Karoo Basin (South Africa), aiming to determine the inter-elemental variation in their bone histology and their possible lifestyle adaptations, is published by Bhat, Shelton & Chinsamy (2021).
- A study on the bone histology of multiple skeletal elements of three specimens belonging to the genus Jonkeria from the Tapinocephalus Assemblage Zone, and on its implications for the knowledge of the paleobiology of these dinocephalians, is published by Bhat, Shelton & Chinsamy (2021).
- A study on the bone histology of multiple skeletal elements of dinocephalians from the Tapinocephalus Assemblage Zone of the Karoo Basin is published by Bhat, Shelton & Chinsamy (2021).
- New specimen of Lanthanostegus mohoii, providing new information on the anatomy of the skull of this dicynodont and providing the first direct correlation between the lower Abrahamskraal Formation at Jansenville on the eastern side of the Karoo Basin and the southwestern part of this basin, is described by Rubidge, Day & Benoit (2021).
- New burrow casts containing skeletons of Diictodon, including associated remains of adult and infant specimens, are described by Smith et al. (2021), who consider it likely that portions of burrows produced Diictodon by were facultatively used as brood chambers.
- A study on the histology of mandibles and maxillae of Endothiodon bathystoma, and on the development and evolution of multiple tooth rows in this dicynodont, is published by Olroyd et al. (2021).
- Redescription and a study on the phylogenetic relationships of Kunpania scopulusa is published by Angielczyk, Liu & Yang (2021).
- A study on the bone histology and likely life history of specimens of Lystrosaurus from the Lower Triassic Turpan Basin (Xinjiang, China), comparing them with specimens from South Africa, is published by Han, Zhao & Liu (2021).
- A study on the bone histology in a size range of Lystrosaurus skeletal elements from the Jiucaiyuan Formation (China), and on its implications for the knowledge whether members of the genus Lystrosaurus from northern Pangaea had differing life histories than their southern Pangean relatives, is published by Kulik et al. (2021).
- A new postcranial specimen of a stahleckeriid dicynodont, possibly of Stahleckeria, is described from the Chañares Formation, representing the oldest record of stahleckeriine dicynodonts from the Ischigualasto-Villa Unión Basin in Argentina.
- A study on the evolution of dicynodont tusks is published by Whitney et al. (2021).
- A study on the quality of the early cynodont fossil record in time and space, and on its implications for the understanding of the group's evolutionary history, is published by Varnham, Mannion & Kammerer (2021).
- A study on the anatomy and variation of the stapes in Thrinaxodon and Galesaurus is published by Gaetano & Abdala (2021).
- A study on the anatomy of the skull of Bolotridon frerensis, and on the phylogenetic relationships of this species, is published by Pusch, Kammerer & Fröbisch (2021).
- A study on the morphology of the nasal cavity of Exaeretodon riograndensis and Siriusgnathus niemeyerorum is published by Franco et al. (2021).
- A study on the morphology of the endocast of a specimen of Riograndia guaibensis from the Linha São Luiz site (Candelária Sequence of the Santa Maria Supersequence, Brazil) is published by Kerber et al. (2021).
- Description of a new specimen of Irajatherium hernandezi from the Linha São Luiz site (Candelária Sequence, Brazil), providing new information on the skeletal anatomy of this cynodont, and a study on the phylogenetic relationships of tritheledontids is published by Kerber et al. (2021).
- Description of five partially preserved petrosals of early mammaliaforms from the Middle Jurassic sediments of the Berezovsk coal mine (Krasnoyarsk Krai, Russia), and a study on the implications of these fossils for the knowledge of the evolution of the inner ear anatomy in early mammaliaforms, is published by Schultz et al. (2021).
- New specimen of the Middle Jurassic haramiyidan Vilevolodon diplomylos with well-preserved malleus, incus and ectotympanic is described by Wang et al. (2021).
- Description of two partial postcranial skeletons of Borealestes from the Kilmaluag Formation (Scotland, United Kingdom), and a study on the phylogenetic relationships of this docodont, is published by Panciroli et al. (2021).

== Other animals ==
=== New taxa ===
Name	Novelty	Status	Authors	Age	Type locality	Country	Notes	Images
Aculeiconchus	Gen. et sp. nov	Valid	Zatoń et al.	Devonian (Givetian)	Maywood Formation	United States (Wyoming)	A microconchid. Genus includes new species A. sandbergi.	
Anabarites dalirense	Sp. nov	Valid	Devaere et al.	Early Cambrian	Soltanieh Formation	Iran	An anabaritid.	
Andalucilites	Gen. et sp. nov	Valid	Gutiérrez-Marco, Marek & Malinky	Ordovician (Darriwilian)		Spain	A member of Hyolitha. Genus includes new species A. parvulus.	
Anulitubus	Gen. et sp. nov	Valid	Moczydłowska in Moczydłowska et al.	Ediacaran	Stáhpogieddi Formation	Norway	A member of Eumetazoa of uncertain phylogenetic placement. The type species is A. formosus.	
Arienigraptus balticus	Sp. nov	Valid	Maletz & Ahlberg	Ordovician (Darriwilian)		Sweden	A graptolite.	
Arienigraptus delicatus	Sp. nov	Valid	Maletz & Ahlberg	Ordovician (Darriwilian)		Sweden	A graptolite.	
Arienigraptus robustus	Sp. nov	Valid	Maletz & Ahlberg	Ordovician (Dapingian)		Sweden	A graptolite.	
Arrakiscolex	Gen. et sp. nov	Valid	Leibach et al.	Cambrian (Drumian)	Marjum Formation	United States (Utah)	A palaeoscolecid. Genus includes new species A. aasei.	
Aulozoon	Gen. et sp. nov	In press	Gehling & Runnegar	Ediacaran		Australia	An annelid. The type species is A. soliorum.	
Blastochaetetes reitneri	Sp. nov	In press	Sánchez-Beristain & García-Barrera in Sánchez-Beristain, García-Barrera & Juárez-Aguilar	Late Cretaceous	Tamasopo Formation	Mexico	A chaetetid demosponge.	
Cardiograptus altaicus	Sp. nov	Valid	Lykova & Sennikov	Ordovician (Dapingian)		Russia	A graptolite belonging to the family Isograptidae.	
Choiaella hexactinophora	Sp. nov	Valid	Botting	Ordovician (Darriwilian)	Gilwern Volcanic Formation	United Kingdom	A sponge.	
Coniculus	Gen. et sp. nov	Valid	Moczydłowska in Moczydłowska et al.	Ediacaran	Stáhpogieddi Formation	Norway	A member of Eumetazoa of uncertain phylogenetic placement. The type species is C. elegantis.	
Cornulites spinosus	Sp. nov	Valid	Vinn & Eyzenga	Late Ordovician		Netherlands	A cornulitid tubeworm.	
Ctenorhabdotus campanelliformis	Sp. nov	Valid	Parry et al.	Cambrian (probably Drumian)	Probably Marjum Formation	United States (Utah)	A member of Ctenophora.	
Daihuoides	Gen. et sp. nov	Valid	Klug et al.	Devonian (Frasnian)	Escuminac Formation	Canada (Quebec)	A stem-ctenophore. The type species is D. jakobvintheri.	
Dailyatia icari	Sp. nov	Valid	Claybourn et al.	Cambrian Series 2		Antarctica	A camenellan tommotiid.	
Ekstroemograptus	Gen. et sp. nov	Valid	Maletz & Ahlberg	Ordovician (Darriwilian)		Sweden	A graptolite. Genus includes new species E. inexpectatus.	
Finkoella	Gen. et 2 sp. nov	Valid	Martyshyn in Martyshyn & Uchman	Ediacaran	Mogilev Formation	Ukraine	A possible tunicate described on the basis of sack-like body fossils. The type species is F. ukrainica; genus also includes F. oblonga.	
Hoffmanigraptus	Gen. et sp. et comb. nov	Valid	Kozłowska	Silurian		Czech Republic; Poland	A graptolite. The type species is H. varsoviensis; genus also includes "Plectograptus" ovatus Kozłowska-Dawidziuk, Lenz & Štorch (2001) and "Plectograptus" karlsteinensis Kozłowska-Dawidziuk, Lenz & Štorch (2001).	
Labechia zhuzhainus	Sp. nov	Valid	Jeon in Jeon et al.	Ordovician (Katian)	Xiazhen Formation	China	A stromatoporoid.	
Labechiella beluatus	Sp. nov	Valid	Jeon in Jeon et al.	Ordovician (Katian)	Xiazhen Formation	China	A stromatoporoid.	
Leolites malinkyi	Sp. nov	Valid	Marek & Gutiérrez-Marco in Gutiérrez-Marco, Marek & Malinky	Ordovician (Darriwilian)		Spain	A member of Hyolitha.	
Lepidocoleus caliburnus	Sp. nov	Valid	Jacquet et al.	Devonian (Pragian)	Garra Formation	Australia	A lepidocoleid annelid.	
Lepidocoleus shurikenus	Sp. nov	Valid	Jacquet et al.	Devonian (Pragian)	Garra Formation	Australia	A lepidocoleid annelid.	
Neuropora gigantea	Sp. nov	Valid	Pleș & Schlagintweit in Pleș et al.	Late Jurassic (Kimmeridgian-Tithonian)	Giuvala Formation	Romania	A sponge.	
Novakotheca weifangensis	Sp. nov	Valid	Sun, Sun & Zhao	Cambrian (Wuliuan)	Mantou Formation	China	A member of Hyolitha belonging to the group Hyolithida.	
Oncograptus hastatus	Sp. nov	Valid	Lykova & Sennikov	Ordovician (Dapingian)		Russia	A graptolite belonging to the family Isograptidae.	
Palaeocorvospongilla	Gen. et sp. nov	In press	Samant et al.	Late Cretaceous (Maastrichtian)	Deccan Intertrappean Beds	India	A sponge belonging to the family Palaeospongillidae. Genus includes new species P. cretacea.	
Palaeoparasitylenchus balticus	Sp. nov	Valid	Poinar & Brown	Eocene	Baltic amber	Europe (Baltic Sea region)	A nematode belonging to the family Parasitylenchidae.	
Palaeosaccus minus	Sp. nov	Valid	Luo et al.	Cambrian	Shuijingtuo Formation	China	A sponge.	
Palaeoscoloplos	Gen. et sp. nov	Valid	Knaust	Middle Triassic	Muschelkalk	Germany	An annelid, possibly a member of the family Orbiniidae. Genus includes new species P. triassicus.	
Papiliograptus retimarginatus	Sp. nov	Valid	Kozłowska & Bates	Silurian (Homerian)		Germany; Poland	A graptolite belonging to the family Retiolitidae.	
Paraclimacograptus crameri	Sp. nov	Valid	Loydell & Abouelresh	Silurian (Aeronian)	Qusaiba Shale Formation	Saudi Arabia	A graptolite.	
Paradoryphoribius	Gen et sp. nov		Mapalo et al.	Miocene	Dominican amber	Dominican Republic	A tardigrade. The type species is P. chronocaribbeus.	
Paramackenzia	Gen. et sp. nov	Valid	Zhao et al.	Early Cambrian		China	A member of the family Mackenziidae (organisms of uncertain phylogenetic placement, possibly stem eumetazoans). Genus includes new species P. canalifera.	
Paratetilla milanek	Sp. nov	Valid	Łukowiak in Łukowiak et al.	Middle Eocene		Ukraine	A sponge belonging to the family Tetillidae.	
Pauxillites desolatus	Sp. nov	Valid	Gutiérrez-Marco, Marek & Malinky	Ordovician (Darriwilian)		Spain	A member of Hyolitha.	
Pharyngomorpha	Gen. et sp. nov	Valid	Martyshyn & Uchman	Ediacaran	Mogilev Formation	Ukraine	Possibly a fragment of the pharyngeal basket of a tunicate. The type species is P. reticulata.	
Pseudopelagiella	Gen. et comb. nov	Valid	Landing et al.	Cambrian	Kinzers Formation	United States (Pennsylvania)	A polychaete, likely a member of Sabellida; a new genus for "Pelagiella" exigua Resser & Howell.	
Robardetlites	Gen. et sp. nov	Valid	Gutiérrez-Marco, Marek & Malinky	Ordovician (Darriwilian)		Spain	A member of Hyolitha. Genus includes new species R. sevillanus.	
Rugosusivitta	Gen. et sp. nov	Valid	Tang et al.	Early Cambrian	Yuhucun Formation	China	A ribbon-shaped, bilaterally symmetrical organism, probably a flatworm of uncertain phylogenetic placement. The type species is R. orthogonia.	
Saetaspongia jianhensis	Sp. nov	Valid	Ling et al.	Cambrian Stage 4	Balang Formation	China	A sponge of uncertain phylogenetic placement, possibly with protomonaxonid affinities.	
Selkirkia transita	Sp. nov		Wang et al.	Cambrian Stage 3	Yu'anshan Formation	China	A member of Priapulida belonging to the family Selkirkiidae.	
Silicofistula	Gen. et sp. nov	Valid	Moczydłowska in Moczydłowska et al.	Ediacaran	Stáhpogieddi Formation	Norway	A member of Eumetazoa of uncertain phylogenetic placement. The type species is S. crenulata.	
Sinabeatricea	Gen. et sp. nov	Valid	Jeon in Jeon et al.	Ordovician (Katian)	Xiazhen Formation	China	A stromatoporoid. Genus includes new species S. luteolus.	
Stenothecoides rasettii	Sp. nov	Valid	Johnston & Streng	Cambrian	Burgess Shale	Canada (British Columbia)	A member of Stenothecoida (a group of animals of uncertain affinities, possibly pan-brachiopods).	
Stenothecoides terraglaciei	Sp. nov	Valid	Peel	Cambrian (Wuliuan)	Henson Gletscher Formation	Greenland	A member of Stenothecoida.	
Thalassostaphylos	Gen. et sp. nov	Valid	Parry et al.	Cambrian (Drumian)	Marjum Formation	United States (Utah)	A member of Ctenophora. The type species is T. elegans.	
Theonella alexandriae	Sp. nov	Valid	Łukowiak in Łukowiak et al.	Late Eocene		Ukraine	A sponge belonging to the family Theonellidae.	
Triticispongia giganta	Sp. nov	Valid	Luo et al.	Cambrian	Shuijingtuo Formation	China	A sponge.	
Turriserpula	Gen. et sp. nov	In press	Dieni & Massari	Early Cretaceous (Berriasian)		Italy	A microserpulid. Genus includes new species T. coralliophila.	
Vauxia paraleioia	Sp. nov	In press	Wei et al.	Cambrian Stage 3		China	A vauxiid sponge.	
Vauxia pregracilenta	Sp. nov	In press	Wei et al.	Cambrian Stage 3		China	A vauxiid sponge.	
Xinliscolex	Gen. et sp. nov	In press	Zhang	Cambrian (Fortunian)		China	An early cycloneuralian. Genus includes new species X. intermedius.	

=== Research ===
- Turner (2021) describes vermiform-microstructured masses from approximately 890-million-year-old Little Dal reefs (Stone Knife Formation, Canada), potentially representing the oldest body fossils of sponges (and animals in general) reported to date.
- A study on the internal anatomical structure and development of Charnia masoni, based on data from specimens interpreted as reflecting different developmental stages, is published by Dunn et al. (2021), who interpret their findings as indicating that rangeomorphs were members of the stem group of Eumetazoa.
- A study aiming to identify characters of Kimberella, Ikaria, Dickinsonia and Tribrachidium controlled by conserved developmental processes, as well as genetic elements likely responsible for their expression, is published by Evans, Droser & Erwin (2021), who also attempt to determine phylogenetic positions of these taxa relative to extant animals.
- Structures interpreted as traces of motor activity of Dickinsonia are reported by Ivantsov & Zakrevskaya (2021), who interpret the studied traces as indicating that Dickinsonia was capable of both attachment and mobility.
- A study on the location of module addition during growth in Dickinsonia costata is published by Evans et al. (2021).
- A study aiming to determine the feeding mode of Arkarua adami is published by Cracknell et al. (2021).
- A fossil specimen sharing anatomical features with both archaeocyaths and vauxiids is described from the early Cambrian Guanshan Lagerstätte (South China) by Luo et al. (2021), who suggest that vauxiids were descendants of archaeocyaths rather than Cambrian representatives of horny demosponges.
- A study on the morphology and affinities of Shaanxilithes is published by Wang et al. (2021).
- A study aiming to test the hypothesis that the type and extent of calcification and morphology in Cloudina was controlled environmentally, based on data from Cloudina assemblages from localities in the Upper Omkyk Member of the Nama Group (Namibia), is published by Shore & Wood (2021).
- Taxonomic revision of the Ediacaran tubular fossils Cloudina, Sinotubulites and Conotubus is published by Yang et al. (2021).
- Shore et al. (2021) report the first three-dimensional, pyritized preservation of soft tissue in Namacalathus hermanastes from the Nama Group (Namibia), and evaluate the implications of this finding for the knowledge of the phylogenetic relationships of this animal.
- A novel type of agglutinated tube, made of silt-sized particles forming a flanged shape that was previously unknown in the fossil record, is described from the Devonian Ponta Grossa Formation (Brazil) by Becker-Kerber et al. (2021), who identify the studied tubes as belonging to the species Annulitubus mutvei, and note their similarities to tubes made by polychaetes from the family Maldanidae.
- New specimen of Protowenella flemingi is described from the Cambrian Henson Gletscher Formation (Greenland) by Peel (2021), who interprets the anatomy of this specimen as indicating that Protowenella was a hyolith rather than a mollusc.
- A new assemblage of fossil eggs, embryos attributable to the early scalidophoran Markuelia, and early post-embryonic developmental stages of camenellans is described from the Cambrian Stage 3 Salanygol Formation (Mongolia) by Steiner et al. (2021).
- Yang et al. (2021) describe fossil material from the Guanshan biota (China) providing evidence of consistent occurrence of Cambrian priapulan worms (possibly belonging to the genus Eximipriapulus) within the conical shells of hyoliths, representing the first direct evidence of the adoption of a different organism's exoskeleton in the priapulans and within the Paleozoic era.
- Description of new fossil material of Tabelliscolex hexagonus from the Cambrian Chengjiang biota (Yu'anshan Formation, China), and a study on the phylogenetic affinities of palaeoscolecids, is published by Shi & Howard et al. (2021); the study is subsequently criticized by Smith & Dhungana (2021).
- Redescription of Stanleycaris hirpex, and a study on the phylogenetic relationships of this species and on the functional specialization of the frontal appendages of this and other stem euarthropods, is published by Moysiuk & Caron (2021).

== Other organisms ==
=== New taxa ===
Name	Novelty	Status	Authors	Age	Type locality	Location	Notes	Images
Amsassia terranovensis	Sp. nov	In press	Lee, Elias & Pratt	Ordovician (Tremadocian)	Watts Bight Formation	Canada (Newfoundland and Labrador)	A calcareous alga, possibly representing an extinct group of green algae.	
Bicellum	Gen. et sp. nov		Strother & Wellman in Strother et al.	Torridonian	Diabaig Formation	United Kingdom	An organism of uncertain phylogenetic placement, possibly an early member of Holozoa. Genus includes new species B. brasieri. Appears to have differentiated multicellularity.	
Dictyosphaera smaugi	Sp. nov	Valid	Loron et al.	Mesoproterozoic	Dismal Lakes Group	Canada	An organic-walled microfossil.	
Gigarimaneta	Gen. et sp. nov	Valid	Taylor et al.	Ediacaran	Mistaken Point Formation	Canada (Newfoundland and Labrador)	An organism growing on the seafloor in a manner similar to Fractofusus and Beothukis. Genus includes new species G. samsoni.	
Ladariella	Gen. et sp. nov		Diniz & Leme in Diniz, Leme & Boggiani	Ediacaran	Tamengo Formation	Brazil	A macroalga of uncertain phylogenetic placement, possibly related to the family Eoholyniaceae. Genus includes new species L. hidria.	
Ladariophyton	Gen. et sp. nov		Diniz & Leme in Diniz, Leme & Boggiani	Ediacaran	Tamengo Formation	Brazil	A macroalga of uncertain phylogenetic placement, possibly related to the family Eoholyniaceae. Genus includes new species L. veinosa.	
Lagoenaforma	Gen. et sp. nov	In press	Agić et al.	Late Ediacaran	Stáhpogieddi Formation	Canada (Newfoundland and Labrador); Namibia; Norway	A flask-shaped microfossil. Genus includes new species L. collaris.	
Lanceaphyton	Gen. et sp. nov	In press	Wang et al.	Ediacaran		China	A high-level eukaryotic macroalga. Genus includes new species L. xiaojiangensis.	
Ostiosphaera	Gen. et sp. nov	In press	Yin et al.	Ediacaran	Doushantuo Formation	China	An embryo-like fossil of a eukaryote of uncertain affinities, possibly a holozoan. The type species is O. rara.	
Palaeohypothrix	Gen. et sp. nov		Da Silva Paiva & de Souza Carvalho	Early Cretaceous (Berriasian–Barremian)	Maracangalha Formation	Brazil	A spirotrich. Genus includes new species P. bahiensis.	
Quadrimurus	Gen. et sp. nov	Valid	Miao, Moczydłowska & Zhu	Early Mesoproterozoic	Xiamaling Formation	China	An organic-walled microfossil. Genus includes new species Q. clavatus.	
Rhyniotaxillus minutulus	Sp. nov	Valid	Krings	Early Devonian	Windyfield chert	United Kingdom	A colonial cyanobacterium.	
Rhystigonema	Gen. et sp. nov	In press	Krings	Early Devonian	Rhynie chert	United Kingdom	A filamentous cyanobacterium belonging to the family Stigonemataceae. Genus includes new species R. obscurum.	
Tamengophyton	Gen. et sp. nov		Diniz & Leme in Diniz, Leme & Boggiani	Ediacaran	Tamengo Formation	Brazil	A macroalga of uncertain phylogenetic placement, possibly related to the family Eoholyniaceae. Genus includes new species T. espinosa.	
Vikisphaera	Gen. et sp. nov	Valid	Hints, Nõlvak & Liang	Ordovician (Darriwilian)	Loobu Formation	Estonia; Latvia; Russia; Sweden	An organic-walled microfossil of uncertain affinities, possibly representing egg capsules of marine animals. Genus includes new species V. kundana.	

=== Research ===
- Well-preserved putative filamentous microfossils, potentially representing the oldest known indigenous subsurface microorganisms with a methane-based metabolism, are described from the ~3.42-billion-year-old subseafloor hydrothermal vein system from the Barberton Greenstone Belt by Cavalazzi et al. (2021).
- Delarue et al. (2021) describe 3.4 billion years old microfossils preserved with a tail-like structure from the Strelley Pool Formation (Australia), and interpret the tail-like appendage as likely providing early microorganisms with movement capabilities.
- A study on the preservation of ~ 1 billion years old organic matter in the Lakhanda Lagerstätte (Siberia, Russia) is published by Duda et al. (2021), who interpret this Lagerstätte as evidence of an environment dominated by anaerobic bacteria with no or very little inputs by eukaryotes.
- Tang et al. (2021) describe dark discoidal, semicircular, or ovate structures preserved on fossil of early Neoproterozoic eukaryotes Tawuia and Sinosabellidites from North China, and interpret these structures as fossils of eukaryotic epibionts that lived on the surface of and may have benefited from an association with their Tawuia and Sinosabellidites hosts.
- Well-preserved communities of large unbranched filamentous microorganisms, bearing morphological and ecological similarities with large sulfide-oxidizing bacteria such as Beggiatoa, are described from the Ediacaran Itajaí Basin (Brazil) by Becker-Kerber et al. (2021).
- Ediacaran fossils, including mouldically preserved desiccated microbial mat fossils, Arumberia-type fossils, and associated metre-scale structures, are described from the Gibbett Hill and Ferryland Head formations (Newfoundland, Canada) by McMahon et al. (2021), who interpret the metre-scale structures as fossil biofilm streamers induced by currents.
- A study on the morphology of Arumberia, based on data from findings from the lower Cambrian Port Lazo Formation (Brittany, France), is published by McMahon et al. (2021), who interpret Arumberia as recording the remains of extinct, sessile filamentous organisms (possibly microbial or algal).
- Zacaï et al. (2021) attempt to determine the potential timing of establishment of the latitudinal diversity gradient for early Paleozoic acritarchs and its evolution through time .
- A study on the affinities of archaeocyaths, interpreting them as possible consortia of siphonous green seaweeds and cyanobacteria-like microbes, is published by Kaźmierczak & Kremer (2021).
- A study on the impact of Earth's orbital eccentricity on the evolution of coccolithophores during the last 2.8 million years is published Beaufort et al. (2021).

== History of life in general ==
- A study on the taphonomy of eukaryotic organelles, assessing the basis of the view that organelles decay too rapidly to be fossilized and evaluating the plausibility of the claims of organelles preserved in Proterozoic fossils, is published by Carlisle et al. (2021).
- Evidence of the presence of significant populations of both red and green algae ca. 1.4 billion years ago (600 million years earlier than previously recognized) is reported from the Xiamaling Formation (China) by Zhang et al. (2021).
- A study on the micro- and ultra-structures and chemical components of embryo-like fossils from the early Ediacaran Weng'an biota (China) is published by Sun et al. (2021).
- A study on the latitudinal distribution of the macrobiota through the late Ediacaran is published by Boddy et al. (2021).
- A study on the major biotic transitions in the Phanerozoic fossil record of the benthic marine faunas is published by Rojas et al. (2021), who report evidence of three major biotic transitions (across the end-Cambrian, end-Permian, and mid-Cretaceous boundaries).
- A study on changes of diversity of skeletonized marine invertebrates in the fossil record, evaluating the impact of dead clades walking on broader trends in Phanerozoic biodiversity, is published by Barnes, Sclafani & Zaffos (2021), who identify 70 invertebrate orders that experienced major diversity losses without recovery, but note that most of these taxa had a long duration after the drop in diversity, and many drops in diversity without recovery were not associated with mass extinction events.
- A study on the relationship between changes in surface oxygenation and extinction rates of marine animals throughout the Phanerozoic is published by Stockey et al. (2021).
- A study on shifts in the dynamics of the evolution of body size in marine animals between background intervals and the "Big Five" Phanerozoic extinction events is published by Monarrez, Heim & Payne (2021).
- A study on changes of nutrient content of planktonic organic matter throughout the Phanerozoic is published by Sharoni & Halevy (2021).
- New Burgess Shale-type Cambrian paleocommunity, preserving fossil eggs and fossils of members various phyla representing early and middle ontogenetic stages, is described from Haiyan (China) by Yang et al. (2021), who interpret the deposit as either preserving one of the earliest known nurseries in the fossil record, or recording several attempted invasions.
- Geyer & Landing (2021) report a hitherto unknown Cambrian Stage 3 Lagerstätte from the Amouslek Formation (Morocco), preserving the first relatively abundant fossils with exceptional preservation from the Cambrian of Morocco (and Africa).
- A study on the relationship between climate changes and origination rates in the marine fossil taxa throughout the last 485 million years is published by Mathes, Kiessling & Steinbauer (2021).
- A study on the relationship between the rate and magnitude of climate change and the extinction rate of marine animals throughout the last 450 million years is published by Song et al. (2021).
- A study on Carboniferous and early Permian tetrapod tracks, and on their implications for the knowledge of evolutionary changes in the anatomy of the trackmakers in and locomotion style close to the origin of amniotes, is published by Buchwitz et al. (2021).
- A study aiming to determine the climatic preferences of major Permo-Triassic tetrapod groups is published by Liu, Angielczyk & Abdala (2021).
- A study on the impact of Permian mass extinctions on continental invertebrate infauna, based on data from the Iberian Basin (central Spain), is published by Buatois et al. (2021), who report evidence of a dramatic decrease in bioturbation intensity on land by the end of the Capitanian, coinciding with an increase in weathering intensity and acidic conditions, and a collapse in plant communities spanning the late Permian–Early Triassic in the Iberian Basin.
- A review of the state of research on the Capitanian mass extinction event in the Karoo Basin (South Africa) is published by Day & Rubidge (2021).
- Evidence from tetrapod fossil record from the Karoo Basin (South Africa) indicative of a protracted (~1 Ma) extinction on land during the Permian-Triassic transition is presented by Viglietti et al. (2021).
- Evidence of two pulses of extinction at the Permian–Triassic boundary caused by different environmental triggers is reported from the Liangfengya section in the South China Block by Li et al. (2021).
- Evidence of algal and bacterial blooms following forest ecosystem collapse during the Permian–Triassic extinction event is reported from the Sydney Basin (Australia) by Mays et al. (2021), who interpret their findings as indicating that the proliferation of microbial communities was both a symptom of ecosystem collapse, and a cause of its delayed recovery in the aftermath of the Permian–Triassic mass extinction.
- Smith et al. (2021) describe diverse assemblages of Early Triassic marine organisms from three new sites of the same age as the Paris Canyon exposures, and another slightly younger site, from Nevada and Idaho (United States), providing information on the recovery of marine biotas in the aftermath of the Permian–Triassic extinction event.
- A study on the recovery of marine level-bottom communities in the aftermath of the Permian–Triassic extinction event, focusing on recovery during the Middle Triassic, is published by Friesenbichler, Hautmann & Bucher (2021).
- Revision of the Triassic record of tetrapod tracks is published by Klein & Lucas (2021).
- A study on the diversity dynamics and evolution of the functional morphology of tetrapod herbivores throughout the Triassic and Early Jurassic is published by Singh et al. (2021).
- Marchetti et al. (2021) revise the tetrapod (including dinosauromorph) footprint assemblage from the Quarziti del Monte Serra Formation (Ladinian of Italy), and interpret this assemblage and other findings of Ladinian dinosauromorph footprints as evidence of wide dispersal of dinosauromorphs as early as the Middle Triassic.
- Description of a rich assemblage of marine taxa from the Carnian Polzberg Lagerstätte (Austria) is published by Lukeneder & Lukeneder (2021).
- A study aiming to determine the relationship between the development of the Jehol Biota in northeast China and the destruction of the North China Craton in the Early Cretaceous is published by Zhou et al. (2021).
- The first evidence of a Late Cretaceous terrestrial community in the Caribbean, including fossil material of a midsize pterosaur and remains of plants belonging to the families Cupressaceae and Lauraceae, is reported from three upper Campanian–lower Maastrichtian localities in Cuba by Viñola-López et al. (2021).
- A study on the timing of the recovery of the biological pump and marine plankton diversity in the aftermath of the Cretaceous–Paleogene extinction event is published by Birch et al. (2021).
- A study on the impact of tectonic evolution in the Tethyan region on the evolution and diversity patterns of Eurasian animals throughout the Cenozoic is published by Zhao, Hou & Li (2021).
- Zouhri et al. (2021) describe a diverse vertebrate fauna from the Eocene (Bartonian) Aridal Formation (Western Sahara), including 12 species of cartilaginous fishes, at least three species of turtles, at least two longirostrine crocodylian taxa, the oldest record of Pelagornis reported to date, and a proboscidean possibly belonging to the genus Barytherium.
- Garrouste et al. (2021) report the discovery of Cretaceous and Miocene fossil assemblages from New Caledonia, providing new information on the diversity of fossil plants and insects from this island.
- Synopsis of the fossil vertebrate assemblages of the Pisco Formation (Peru), and a study on their implications for the knowledge of the Humboldt Current Ecosystem during the Miocene, is published by Collareta et al. (2021).
- Rich middle Miocene rainforest biome (the Zhangpu biota) preserved in amber and associated sedimentary rocks is reported from the Fotan Group (southeastern China) by Wang et al. (2021).
- Description of non-mammal vertebrate fauna from the Miocene (Messinian) Monticino Quarry (Italy), including the oldest known records of the javelin sand boa or a related species, snakes belonging to the genus Malpolon and an unambiguous bustard reported to date, is published by Villa et al. (2021).
- A study on the age of escorias (glassy rock fragments similar to volcanic scoriae, likely products of extraterrestrial impacts) collected along the Pampean Atlantic coast from the "Irene" and Chapadmalal Formations (Argentina), and on their implications for the knowledge of the timing of late Miocene–Pliocene faunal succession in the Pampean Region, is published by Prevosti et al. (2021).
- A study on the age of the most recent Pleistocene megafaunal specimens from Cloggs Cave (Australia), and on its implications for the knowledge of the timing and causes of Late Pleistocene extinctions of Australian megafauna, is published by David et al. (2021).
- A study aiming to determine whether a significant relationship can be detected between demographic susceptibility to extinction of members of Quaternary megafauna of Sahul and their extinction chronology inferred from their fossil record is published by Bradshaw et al. (2021).
- A study aiming to determine whether the fossil record indicates that the arrival of hominins on islands in the Pleistocene was coincident with the disappearance of insular taxa is published by Louys et al. (2021).
- A study on ancient environmental DNA of plants and animals recovered from sediments from sites distributed across much of the Arctic, covering the past 50 thousand years, is published by Wang et al. (2021), who interpret their findings as indicative of a relatively homogeneous steppe–tundra flora dominating the Arctic during the Last Glacial Maximum, followed by regional divergence of vegetation during the Holocene, as well as providing evidence of the survival of the woolly rhinoceros in northeast Kolyma as late as approximately 9.8 ka and the survival of mammoths in North America and Siberia into the Early Holocene (as late as approximately 3.9 ka in the area of the Taymyr Peninsula), and providing evidence of a previously unsampled mitochondrial lineage of mammoths.
- Murchie et al. (2021) present a 30,000-year sedimentary ancient DNA record from permafrost silts in the Klondike region of Yukon (Canada), and interpret their findings as indicative of a substantial turnover in ecosystem composition between 13,500 and 10,000 calendar years ago with the replacement of the steppe-tundra ecosystem by woody shrubs, as well as indicative of persistence of North American horses and woolly mammoths for thousands of years after their supposed disappearance from the fossil record.
- A study on the chronology of Late Pleistocene shrub expansion and megafauna extinctions in eastern Beringia is published by Monteath et al. (2021), who interpret their findings as indicating that the postglacial expansion of shrub tundra preceded the regional decline of populations of large mammal grazers.
- A study on the extinction dynamics of the elephant birds and Malagasy hippos is published by Hansford et al. (2021), who interpret their findings as indicating that these animals persisted for millennia after first human arrival on Madagascar, that their communities collapsed suddenly ~1200-900 BP, and that their extinctions were closely correlated in time with intensive conversion of forests to grassland, probably resulting from human shift to agro-pastoralism.
- A study aiming to determine how observed extinctions in the geological past can be predicted from the interaction of long-term temperature trends with short-term climate change is published by Mathes et al. (2021).
- A study on the impact of the Capitanian mass extinction event, Permian–Triassic extinction event and Triassic–Jurassic extinction event on terrestrial and freshwater ecosystems, aiming to quantify community resistance during the extinction events and to determine ecological dynamics of communities before and after these extinctions, is published by Huang et al. (2021).
- A study on correlations between fossilization potential and food web features, aiming to determine how fossilization impacts inferences of ancient community structure, is published by Shaw et al. (2021).
- A study on the drilling predation pressure on sea urchins across the Mesozoic and Cenozoic is published by Petsios et al. (2021), who present evidence indicative of the Cenozoic intensification of this predation, and argue that the Mesozoic marine revolution was more likely a series of asynchronous processes with variable significance across different groups of predators and preys, rather than a single synchronized ecosystem-wide event.
- A study on the spatial biodiversity dynamics of unicellular marine plankton throughout the Cenozoic, aiming to test the generality of the "out of the tropics" hypothesis (positing that the tropics are both a cradle and source of biodiversity for extratropical regions), is published by Raja & Kiessling (2021).
- A study on the evolution of ecophysiological adaptations to life in the sea in extant and fossil marine tetrapods (excluding birds) is published by Motani & Vermeij (2021).

== Other research ==
- Mißbach et al. (2021) report the existence of indigenous organic molecules and gases in primary fluid inclusions in c. 3.5-billion-year-old barites from the Dresser Formation (Pilbara Craton, Australia), providing evidence of the organic composition of primordial fluids that were available for the early microbes.
- A study on the 3.4-billion-year old organic films from the Buck Reef Chert (Kaapvaal craton, South Africa) is published by Alleon et al. (2021), who interpret their findings as indicating that early Archean organic films carry chemical information directly related to their original molecular compositions, and evaluate the implications of their finding for the knowledge of the initial chemical nature of organic microfossils found in ancient rocks.
- A study on the evolution of marine dissolved organic carbon concentrations is published by Fakhraee et al. (2021), who interpret their findings as indicating that the overall size of the marine dissolved organic carbon reservoir has likely undergone very little variation through Earth's history, casting doubt on previously hypothesized links between marine dissolved organic carbon levels and the emergence and radiation of early animals.
- A study on the age of the Ediacaran stratigraphic successions in South China, and on its implications for the knowledge of the timing of the rise and early evolution of complex macroscopic life, is published by Yang et al. (2021).
- A study on the carbon isotopic composition of marine carbonates and on the age of the Ediacaran Nama Group (Namibia) and other geological formations from the Ediacaran-Cambrian transition around the world, and on their implications for the knowledge of the early radiation of animals, is published by Bowyer et al. (2021).
- A study on the timing and sequence of events through the early Darriwilian leading to the Great Ordovician Biodiversification Event is published by Rasmussen, Thibault & Rasmussen (2021), who interpret their findings as refuting the proposed link between the Ordovician meteor event and the icehouse conditions preceding the Ordovician radiation, and indicating that the meteorite fallout postdated both the onset of glaciation and the onset of the Ordovician radiation.
- A study on the impact of volcanism-related delivery of the nutrient phosphorus to the Late Ordovician ocean on global cooling and Late Ordovician mass extinction is published by Longman et al. (2021).
- A study evaluating the validity of the Devonian bioregionalization first proposed by Boucot, Johnson & Talent (1969) is published by Dowding, Ebach & Madroviev (2021).
- Evidence of prolonged and repeated oxygen stress in the Appalachian Basin associated with the Late Devonian extinctions is presented by Boyer et al. (2021).
- Rakociński et al. (2021) report very large anomalous mercury spikes from the south-western part of Tian Shan (Uzbekistan), and interpret this finding as evidence of intensive volcanic activity both predating and occurring during the Hangenberg Crisis.
- Evidence from the South China Block indicative of extensive felsic volcanic activity coincident with the Permian–Triassic extinction event is presented by Zhang et al. (2021), who interpret their findings as indicating that felsic volcanism in South China was a key contributor to the environmental deterioration that led to the Permian–Triassic extinction event.
- Evidence from the southern Karoo Basin of South Africa indicative of at least four atmospheric carbon dioxide spikes coinciding with extinctions on land and at sea from the Late Permian to the Middle Triassic is presented by Retallack (2021).
- Lu et al. (2021) present a record of volcanism and environmental changes from Carnian lake succession of the Jiyuan Basin (North China), and interpret their findings as indicative of four pulses of volcanism which were probably responsible for the global carbon isotope excursions that marked the Carnian pluvial episode and drove major environmental changes in the Jiyuan Basin.
- A study evaluating whether fuel-driven changes to fire activity during the Cretaceous period had the ability to counteract rising atmospheric oxygen at this time is published by Belcher et al. (2021), who argue that alteration of fire feedbacks driven by the rise of the flowering plants likely lowered atmospheric oxygen levels from ~30% to 25% by the end of the Cretaceous.
- White & Campione (2021) describe a workflow in which three-dimensional surface profiles of fragmentary fossils can be quantitatively compared to better-known exemplars in order to identify fragmentary fossils, and apply this workflow to megaraptorid theropod unguals from the Cretaceous of Australia.
- A study aiming to test whether histological characters can be used to assign bones to individuals within a quarry, using sauropod dinosaur material from two adjacent Morrison quarries in the Bighorn Basin (Wyoming, United States) as a case study, is published by Wiersma-Weyand et al. (2021).
- A study on diverse amniotic eggshells from the Wido Volcanics (Upper Cretaceous, South Korea), evaluating their utility for assessments of the paleothermometry of the sedimentary deposits, is published by Choi et al. (2021).
- A study on the age and duration of the Lower Cretaceous Yixian Formation (China) is published by Zhong et al. (2021).
- A study on the age of the Jiufotang Formation outcrops in the Jianchang Basin (Liaoning, China) is published by Yu et al. (2021).
- A study on the elevation and mean annual temperature of the Sihetun area (Liaoning, China) in the Early Cretaceous, when the area was inhabited by feathered dinosaurs, is published by Zhang, Yin & Wang (2021), who interpret their findings as indicative of a high altitude and cold habitat with frozen winters for the Jehol Biota in this area, and evaluate possible implications of such habitat for the evolution of the feathered characteristic of the dinosaurs.
- A study on possible impact of taphonomic biases on preservation of small-bodied dinosaurs and mammals from the Hell Creek and Lance formations, and on its implications for the knowledge of diversity and abundance of small-bodied taxa from these formations, is published by Brown et al. (2021).
- Goderis et al. (2021) report new data revealing a positive iridium anomaly within the peak-ring sequence of the Chicxulub impact structure, and interpret this finding as conclusively tying Chicxulub to the global iridium layer and Cretaceous-Paleogene boundary sections worldwide, confirming the link between crater formation and the iridium peak detected in these sections.
- DePalma et al. (2021) present data from histological and histo-isotopic analyses of fossil fish from the Tanis fossil site (North Dakota, United States), interpreted as indicating that the end-Cretaceous Chicxulub impact occurred during boreal Spring/Summer, shortly after the spawning season for fish and most continental taxa.
- A study on the taphonomy of marine vertebrate fossils from the Miocene Pisco Formation (Peru), aiming to determine possible causes of their exceptional preservation, is published by Bosio et al. (2021).
- A study on Middle Miocene microfloral assemblages from ten localities in the Madrid Basin (Spain), providing evidence of prevalence of open habitats with grass-dominated, savannah-like vegetation under a warm and semi-arid climatic regime in the Iberian Peninsula in the Middle Miocene, is published by Casas-Gallego et al. (2021).
- A study aiming to determine whether a strong link can be established between stable carbon isotopes of tooth enamel of herbivores and vegetation structure in present African ecosystems, and whether enamel stable carbon isotopes of fossil herbivores are useful for making inferences about Plio-Pleistocene vegetation structure in Africa and the environmental context of hominin evolution, is published by Robinson et al. (2021).
- A study on environmental changes in East Africa at the time of the extinction of Paranthropus boisei is published by Quinn & Lepre (2021), who report evidence of a significant reduction in C_{4} grasslands during Mid-Pleistocene Transition, and argue that this reduction might have escalated dietary competition amongst the abundant C_{4}-feeders and influenced P. boisei's demise; their conclusions are subsequently contested by Patterson et al. (2022).
- Evidence from Chitimwe Beds (northern Malawi), indicating that in the late Pleistocene early modern humans fundamentally altered local landscapes and ecology using fire, is presented by Thompson et al. (2021).
- A study on the climate and environments in the Guadix-Baza Basin (Spain) from the Pliocene to the Middle Pleistocene, aiming to reconstruct environments inhabited by some of the earliest humans who dispersed into Europe, is published by Saarinen et al. (2021).
- A study on the Early Pleistocene environment of the Nihewan Basin (China), as indicated by stable isotope data from tooth enamel of mammals from the Madigou site, is published by Xu et al. (2021).
- A study on environmental changes in Southeast Asia at the time of the Pleistocene turnovers of hominin species culminating with the arrival of Homo sapiens in the area, based on data from mammal fossils from five faunas from Vietnam and Laos whose ages ranged from MIS 6–5 to MIS 3–2, and aiming to determine how the climate changes that occurred during the Late Pleistocene might have influenced the adaptation of the first H. sapiens in the area, is published by Bacon et al. (2021).
- A study on the relationship between the severity of late Quaternary megaherbivore extinctions and fire activity in grassy ecosystems is published by Karp et al. (2021).
- Ellis et al. (2021) examine current biodiversity patterns in relation to distribution of human populations and land use over the past 12,000 years, and argue that as early as 12,000 years ago nearly three quarters of Earth's land was inhabited and shaped by human societies.
- Alleon et al. (2021) revise reports of organic molecules in animal fossils, and argue that purported signatures of organic molecules are in reality instrumental artefacts resulting from intense background luminescence; their conclusions are subsequently contested by Wiemann & Briggs (2022).
- A study aiming to assess how methods used to determine diversification rate variation through time perform when applied to entirely extinct groups, applying them to ornithischian dinosaurs, is published by Černý, Madzia & Slater (2021).
- A new method for estimating dimorphism levels in fossil assemblages is presented by Sasaki et al. (2021).
- A methodological schema for investigating evolvability in the fossil record is proposed by Love et al. (2021).
- Didier & Laurin (2021) present a method to compute the distribution of the extinction time of a given set of taxa, and apply this method to the study of the extinction time of three Permo-Carboniferous synapsid taxa (Ophiacodontidae, Edaphosauridae and Sphenacodontidae).
- A study assessing whether resin impregnation of sediment blocks interferes with the retrieval of ancient DNA from sediments, and evaluating ancient mammalian DNA preservation in Pleistocene sediment blocks from 13 archaeological sites in Europe, Asia, Africa, and North America, is published by Massilani et al. (2021).
- A study exploring the causal relationship between the global distribution of fossil occurrence data and the legacy of colonialism and associated socioeconomic factors, and evaluating the implications of that relationships for the knowledge of past biodiversity, is published by Raja et al. (2021).

=== Paleoclimate ===
- Scotese et al. (2021) estimate how global temperatures have changed during the last 540 million years.
- A high-resolution proxy record of Late Cambrian and Ordovician climate is presented by Goldberg et al. (2021).
- A study on changes in weathering intensity and temperature along a temperate to subpolar southeastern margin of Gondwana (eastern margin of present-day Australia) across the end-Permian extinction is published by Frank et al. (2021).
- A study on the atmospheric CO_{2} levels during the Permian–Triassic transition, based on data from fossil plant remains from sedimentary successions in southwestern China, is published by Wu et al. (2021), who present evidence of a six-fold increase of atmospheric pCO_{2} during the Permian–Triassic mass extinction.
- A study on the source, pace and total amount of CO_{2} emissions during the Permian–Triassic transition is published by Cui et al. (2021), who interpret their findings as suggesting that rapid and massive amount of largely volcanic CO_{2} emission was necessary to drive the observed pattern of carbon isotope excursions, the abrupt decline in surface ocean pH and global temperature increase, and was likely the main cause of the end-Permian mass extinction.
- A study on the climate of the Lufeng area (China) during the Early Jurassic, and on the relationship between the global distribution of dinosaur fossils and climate during the Jurassic, is published by Shen et al. (2021).
- A study on atmospheric carbon dioxide concentration levels during the late Albian, as indicated by stomata characteristics of conifers Pseudofrenelopsis gansuensis and Pseudofrenelopsis dalatzensis from the Dalazi Formation (China), is published by Li, Yang & Zhu (2021).
- Evidence of the presence of a terrestrial climate barrier in the Western Interior Basin of North America during the final 15 million years of the Cretaceous, dividing the Western Interior Basin into warm southern and cool northern biomes, is presented by Burgener et al. (2021), who also report evidence indicating that the biogeographical distribution of plants was heavily influenced by the presence of this temperature transition zone.
- De Winter et al. (2021) present reconstructions of monthly sea surface temperatures at around 50 °N latitude about 78 million years ago, based on data from oyster and rudist shells from the Kristianstad Basin (Sweden).
- A study on CO_{2} contents of early Deccan Traps lavas, aiming to determine whether early Deccan magmatism triggered the warming event during the latest Maastrichtian, is published by Hernandez Nava et al. (2021).
- Vento et al. (2021) estimate parameters of the Paleogene to Neogene climate on the basis of data from fossil leaves from the Río Turbio and Río Guillermo formations in southern South America (Argentina).
- A study aiming to evaluate the fit of molecular phylogenetic and biogeographic data from extant animals and models regarding the age of formation of the Amazon fluvial system is published by Méndez-Camacho, Leon-Alvarado & Miranda-Esquivel (2021).
- 10-million-year long proxy record of Arabian climate is developed by Böhme et al. (2021), who report evidence indicative of a sustained period of hyperaridity in the Pliocene and a number of transient periods of hyperaridity in northern Arabia during the late Miocene which were out of phase with those in North Africa, and argue that these desert dynamics had a strong control on large-scale mammalian dispersals between Africa and Eurasia.
- A study aiming to estimate the tolerance to low precipitation and aridity that would have been required for early humans to successfully exit Africa and to determine the timings of climatic windows out of Africa for humans, based on data from paleoclimate simulations of the last 300,000 years, is published by Beyer et al. (2021).
- A study on climate changes in eastern Africa over the past 200,000 years, evaluating their possible impact on the mobility and dispersal of early Homo sapiens, is published by Schaebitz et al. (2021).
- A study aiming to reconstruct summer and winter temperatures in the Late Pleistocene when Neanderthals were using the site of La Ferrassie (France), based on data from oxygen isotope measurements of bovid tooth enamel, is published by Pederzani et al. (2021).
- A study on local seasonal temperatures in the area of the Bacho Kiro cave (Bulgaria) in the Initial Upper Paleolithic, and on its implications for the knowledge whether early presence of Homo sapiens in Europe was contingent on warm climates, is published by Pederzani et al. (2021).
- Data from analyses and modelling of noble gases in groundwater, indicating that the low-altitude, low-to-mid-latitude land surface (45 degrees south to 35 degrees north) was about 6 °C cooler during the Last Glacial Maximum than during the Late Holocene, is presented by Seltzer et al. (2021).
- Osman et al. (2021) reconstruct surface temperature changes spanning the Last Glacial Maximum to present at 200-year resolution.
