= Bagenovia =

Bagenovia Temporal range: Cambrian

Scientific classification
- Domain: Eukaryota
- Kingdom: Animalia
- Class: †Stenothecoida
- Family: †Cambridiidae
- Genus: †Bagenovia; Koneva 1976

Extinct genus of molluscs

Bagenovia is a genus of Cambrian stenothecoid, presumed to be related to the molluscs, and known from various sites across Asia.
