= Nailiana =

Nailiana Temporal range: 520 Ma

Scientific classification
- Kingdom: Animalia
- Phylum: Cnidaria
- Subphylum: Anthozoa
- Genus: †Nailiana; Ou & Shu in Ou et al., 2021
- Species: †N. elegans

Binomial name
- †Nailiana elegans Ou & Shu in Ou et al., 2021

Cambrian Actinarian

Nailiana elegans is a species of stem-cnidarian from the Chengjiang biota of China that has a polypoidal body plan. It is the only species in the genus Nailiana. The species was first described in 2021 from multiple solitary specimens from China, with some being preserved with Cambrian lingulids that would suggest a lifestyle as a macrophagous predator from the Cambrian. Naliana probably represents one of the earliest evidence for a macrophagous predator within the fossil record, and, because of how the structure of food webs from the Cambrian were very poorly understood with most reconstructions of them being based upon the feeding interactions between Animal species or upon the gut-content of extremely well-preserved fossils, provides important insights and evidence for how complex the nature of early Cambrian food chains actually were.

== Description ==
Nailiana elegans has a superficial appearance to other polypoidal organisms from the Cambrian. From the fossil specimens which were described alongside the species and genus, N. elegans had a slender, elongate body that had two ends with one of them ending with a clearly defined circular mouth and oral disc with a single whorl of eight unbranched, prehensile tentacles that, in one fossil, shows the tentacles surrounded a lingulid brachiopod- which suggests that a predatory lifestyle for N. elegans was present when it was alive. The main column of the body below the mouth exhibits multiple closely spaced longitudinal grooves which can be evidence for traces left by gastric mesenteries on the cylindrical trunk. Nailiana had a similar appearance to Actiniarians (sea anemones) that leads Nailiana to be considered a stem-Cnidarian sharing traits found in other Anthozoans at the time.

=== Paratype ===
The paratype of Nailiana elegans (ELEL-SJ080824-2) exhibits a central circular protuberance that most likely was perforated by a mouth opening bordered by a peripheral disc which is surrounded by eight unbranching tentacles that only form one whorl. A dark green region in the paratype is preserved that is thought to have been the remains of a probable gastric cavity preserved in the upper oral portion of the column. The middle portion of the column shows evidence for flexibility in real life by preserving traces of smooth bending. Although, compared to the holotype of N. elegans (ELEL-SJ080824-1), the column often shows varying degrees of axial tension that results in a wide variation between specimens the ratio between height/weight of their column along with the ratio of length of the column compared to that of the tentacles. The representatives of the organism that show a great amount of axial tension also more-often-than-not also exhibit a localized constriction in the column. The surface of the column also shows multiple closely spaced, fine longitudinal grooves and/or striae. The number of the aforementioned striae varies from 6–12 with a spacing of 3-8 striae per millimetre (3-8 striae per 0.0393701 inches).

== Predatorial evidence ==
In one specimen of Nailiana, it can be seen that a lingulid brachiopod-identified as Lingulellotreta yuanshanensis- isn't superimposed nor is it overlain upon the polyp, but rather the presence of very thin sediment wedges between the brachiopod and the tentacles suggest that the brachiopod was topologically surrounded by those tentacles, with the pedicle and pseudointerarea being situated within the gastric cavity of the polyp of Nailiana. The polyp along with the brachiopod couldn't have lived in a symbiotic relationship because the specimens from the Chengjiang biota are abundant in fossils and are not symbiotic. The team which described Nailiana then proposed that the brachiopod was therefore a captured and engulfed prey item.
