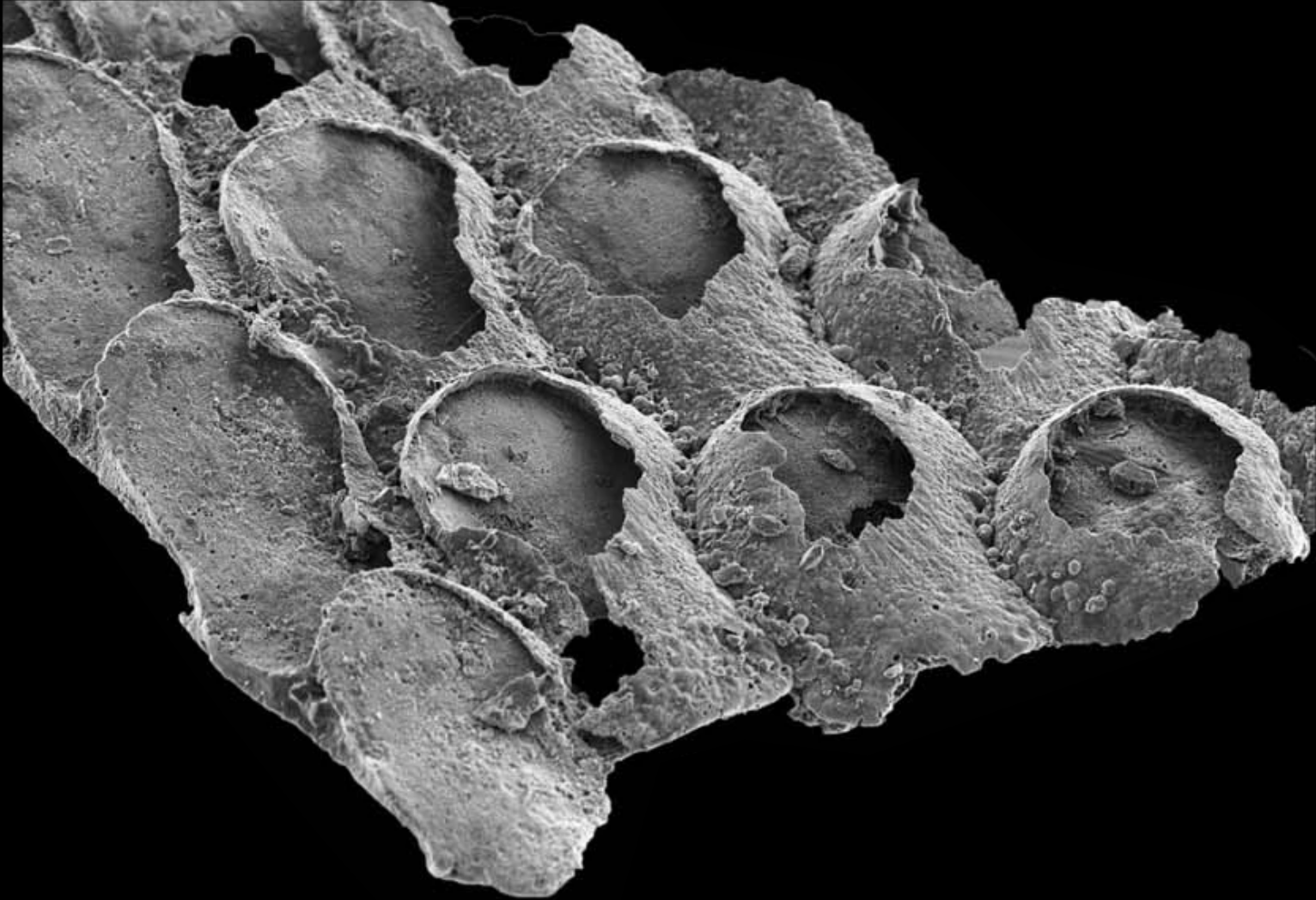
- Microfossil of Protomelission from Wirrealpa

Scientific classification
- Kingdom: Animalia
- Phylum: Bryozoa
- Genus: †Protomelission; Brock & Cooper, 1993
- Species: †P. gatehousei

Binomial name
- †Protomelission gatehousei Brock & Cooper, 1993

= Protomelission =

Protomelission Temporal range: Cambrian stage 3

Contested Cambrian fossil

Protomelission is an extinct genus of bryozoan from the early Cambrian period of what is now Australia and China. The genus contains a single species, Protomelission gatehousei. Its known material comprises cataphract arrays of box-like chambers, forming a club-shaped thallus surrounding a hollow central cavity. Protomelission was initially described as the only bryozoan with no mineralized skeleton, which led to some researchers questioning the affinity of the taxon as a dasycladalean green alga, but subsequent discovery of phosphatized soft tissues in its modular skeleton suggested that it is certainly a bryozoan with mineralized skeleton.

== History of discovery ==
Protomelission was first described by Brock & Cooper in 1993 from limestones in Wirrealpa, Australia. A bryozoan affinity was dismissed on the basis that its walls were too thin, among other things. The fossil material was complemented by additional specimens from China, causing Brock and colleagues to revisit this earlier statement. A key line of evidence in favour of the bryozoan affinity was the regular array of openings exhibited by each chamber. However, these openings were later argued to have arisen taphonomically, i.e. by abrasion of an originally solid wall, or by enlarging a much smaller original hole. Where a bryozoan affinity would denote the presence of a stalked ring of tentacles emerging from each module, the recovery of macrofossil material with soft tissue preservation demonstrated that each chamber was instead associated with a tapering conical flange, better suited to photosynthesis. Authors of the original study are unconvinced by this reinterpretation, suggesting in media reports that the absence of tentacles may in turn be an effect of imperfect preservation. In 2026, Song and colleagues reported phosphatized soft tissues in modular skeleton of Protomelission and Dayingomelission from the Xiannüdong Formation (Cambrian Stage 3) of southern Shaanxi, China, confirming the presence of byrozoans during the early Cambrian.
