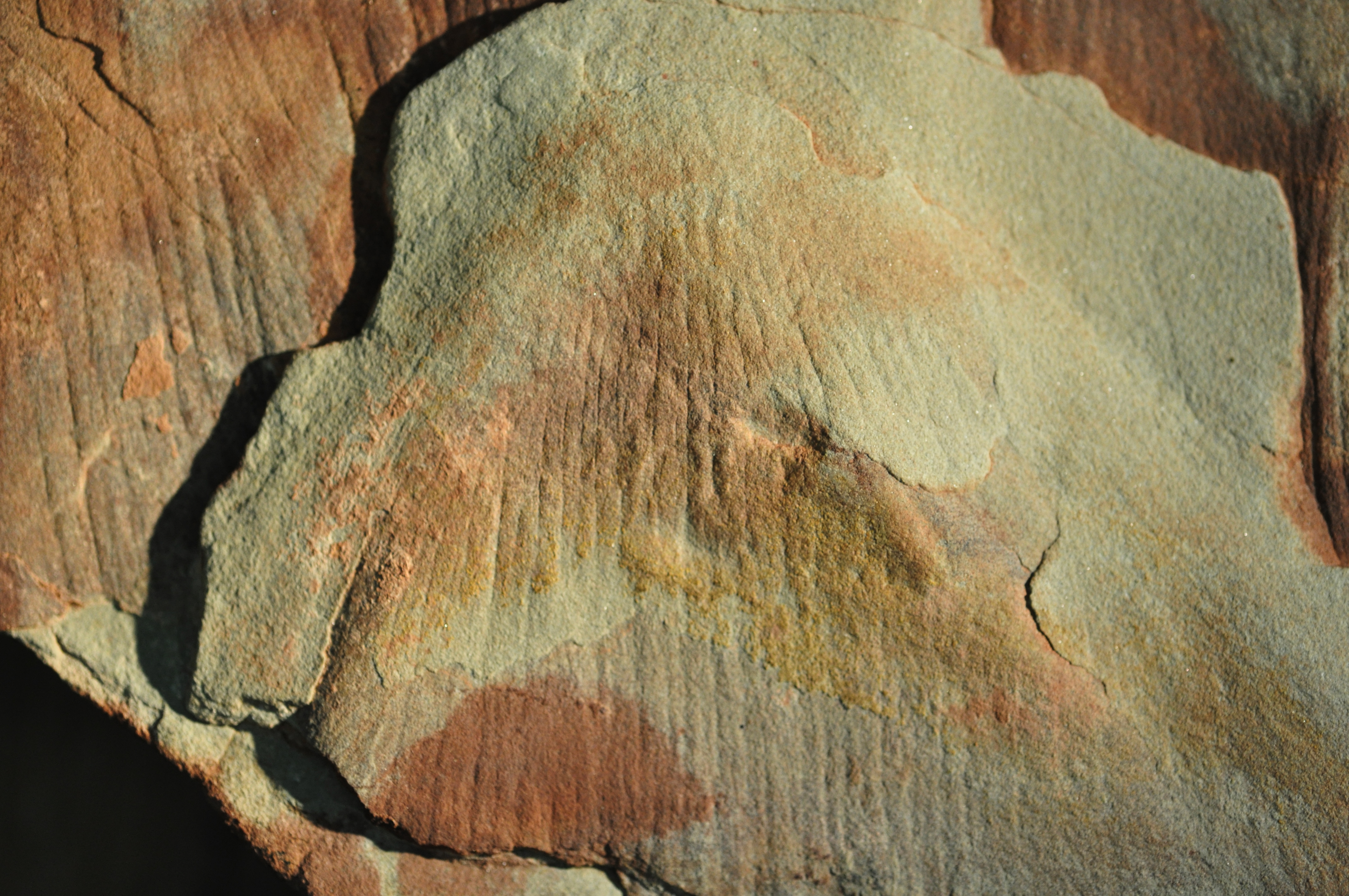
- Holotype specimen of Arumberia banksi, a convex hyporelief on the base of a sandstone bed from the Ediacaran Arumbera Sandstone near Alice Springs, Australia

Scientific classification
- Domain: incertae sedis
- Genus: †Arumberia; Glaessner et Walter, 1975

Type species
- Arumberia banksi Glaessner et Walter, 1975

Species
- A. banksi; A. vindhyanensis; A. usvaensis; A. multykensis; A. beckeri; A. ollii

= Arumberia =

Arumberia Temporal range: Late Ediacaran

Trace fossil

Arumberia is an enigmatic fossil from the Ediacaran period originally described from the Arumbera Sandstone, Northern Territory, Australia but also found in the Urals, East Siberia, England and Wales, Northern France, the Avalon Peninsula, India and Brazil. Several morphologically distinct species are recognized.

== Description ==
Initially discovered by Glaessner and Walter (1975), Arumberia was described as a problematic cupped-body fossil of an Ediacaran soft-bodied organism characterized by hollow compressible ribbed bodies composed of flexible tissue. Brasier (1979) deemed it a pseudofossil arising from turbid water flow in shallow marine or deltaic environments, due in part to physical and morphological similarities to flume-induced structures previously observed by Dzulynski and Walton (1965). Arumberia appears as a poorly-delimited series of fine parallel grooves arising from a single region or point. Arumberia banksii consists of an array of straight to gently curved parallel to subparallel ridges (rugae) about 1 – 3 mm wide and separated by flat to gently concave furrows of 1 – 7 mm in width. Relief from ridge top to furrow bottom is less than 1 mm. Ridge ranges in length from 1.5 cm to 14.5 cm. Generally the ridges are parallel, but they also bifurcate. Ridges are developed on plane and rippled surfaces.

== List of species ==
There are four species of Arumberia that have been formally recognized. Arumberia banksi has thin siliciclastic biolaminites known as rugose structures including those with subparallel or fanning-out series of rugae (Arumberia banksi s.str.) and sub-parallel series of branching rugae (Arumberia vindhyanensis). The Arumberia multykensis variety is found in greenish gray siltstones as series of near-parallel ridges with positive hyporelief up to 1 mm wide and 0.5 mm high, with 10 mm spacing between the ridges while A. usavaensis occurs as a series of near parallel ridges on the wavy surfaces on linguoid ripple marks which stretch along the paleoflow direction and flatten out as microterraces on the leeward side of the ripples. Arumberia usavensis is found on both upper and lower surfaces of sandstone beds as well as inside sandstones and siltstones. Arumberia beckeri and Arumberia ollii are morphologically distinct from A. banksi and are filamentous and ribbon-shaped compressed macrofossils which host authigenic clay minerals and are most likely unrelated to Arumberia.

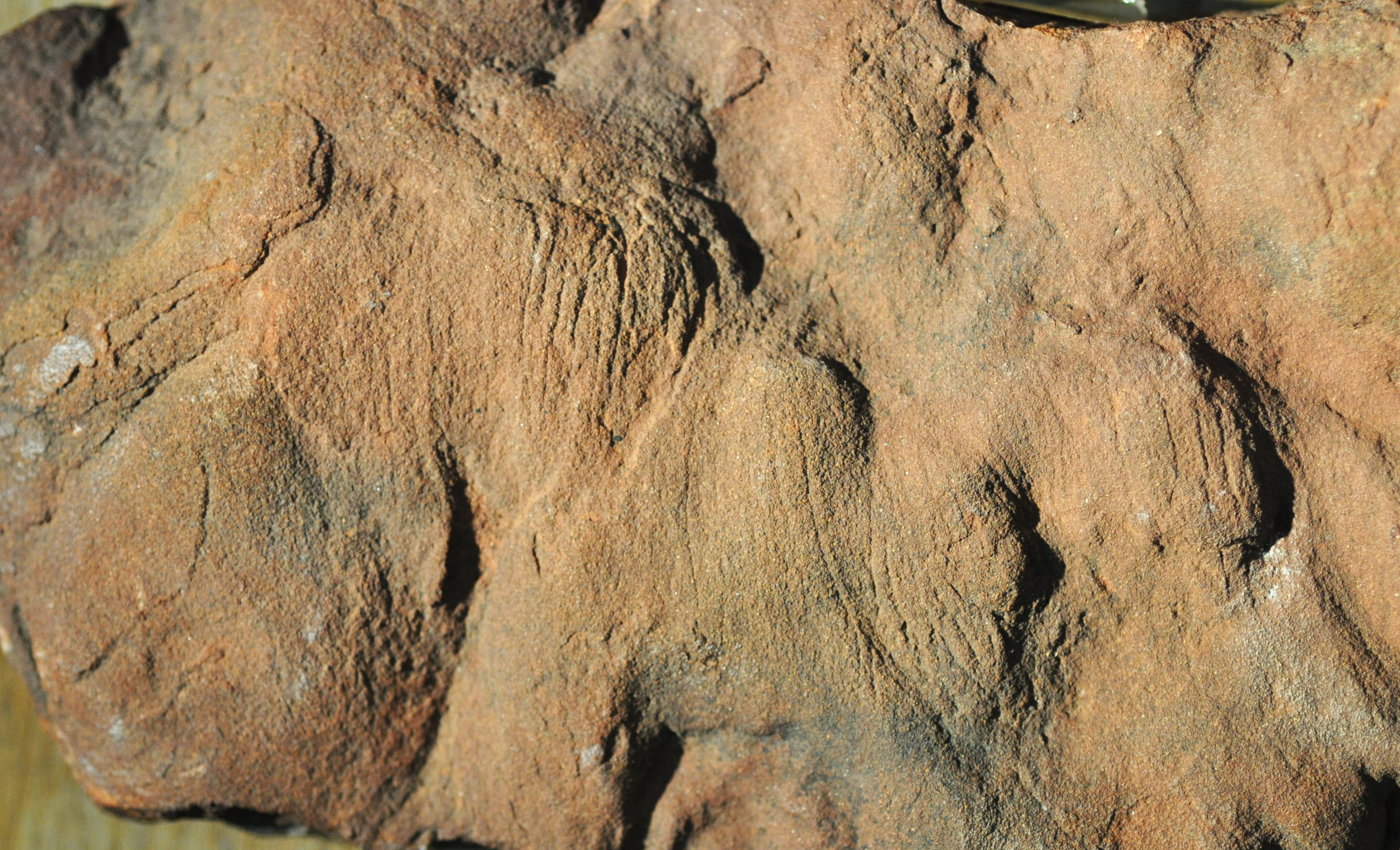
Another specimen of Arumberia banksi, a convex hyporelief on the base of a sandstone bed from the Ediacaran Arumbera Sandstone near Alice Springs, Australia

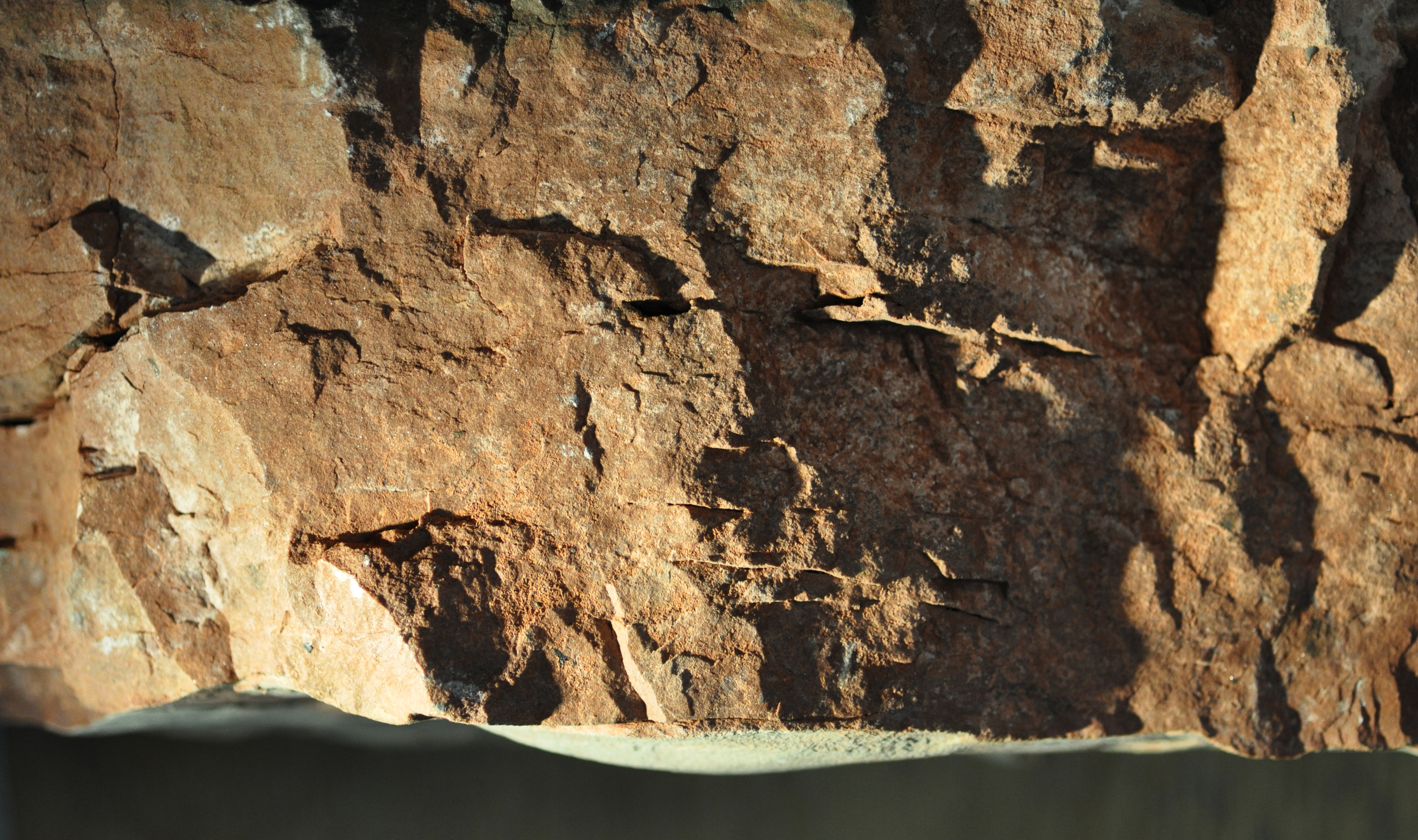
Side view of holotype specimen of Arumberia banksi, a convex hyporelief on the base of the sandstone bed from the Ediacaran Arumbera Sandstone near Alice Springs, Australia

== Locations ==
Arumberia was first described in Neoproterozoic red sandstones of the lower Arumbera sandstone formation of the Amadeus Basin in Northern Territory, Australia. It has since been found in Argentina, Newfoundland, England, Wales, northeastern Europe, the eastern Sayan Mountains in Russia, Central India, and Rajasthan. In addition, Arumberia has been reported from lower Palaeozoic strata in Brittany, France and from the Upper Ediacaran Cerro Negro Formation in Argentina.

== Identity ==
The identity of Arumberia is controversial. Arumberia has been originally interpreted as a 5–20 cm high cup-like organism, apparently composed of flexible tissue, attached to the sea bottom by a blunt apex or, later, as a colonial organism made of flexible, thin-walled tubes tightly joined through their length. Affinities with Ernietta, Conostichus, Pteridinium, Palaeoplatoda, Phyllozoon and Bergaueria and Chuaria have been conjectured. Spheroidal objects found along with Arumberia have also been interpreted as "dispersable stage" of Arumberia itself. Arumberia has been interpreted as a microbial mat morphotype developed in response to environmental perturbations in terminal Ediacaran shallow marine basins

Conversely, a non biological interpretation has been put forward Past experiments reproduced Arumberia-like traces from flume experiments and from the flux of water around small objects. The absence of Arumberia-like structures after the Ediacaran period could be due to the unique properties of the microbial mat that covered the sea floor at the period. However, there is still debate, with recent analysis of Urals' Arumberia-like structures leaning towards a biological interpretation as an organism adapted to shallow water environments. The rugae of Arumberia are considered to form from exclusively biological processes as observed in modern microbial mats and not from sediment desiccation, cracking or other abiotic processes. Fine wisps of organic material have been observed in thin section of Arumberia cut perpendicular to bedding planes, further suggesting that Arumberia was a living organism.

Recent work describes Arumberia as the fossilized remains of highly organized shallow marine microbial colonies; a microbially-induced sedimentary structure (MISS),; a series of slide marks underneath tough biomats that were exposed to tractional currents carrying sediment, or a biopolymer-bearing lichenized fungi. As such, Arumberia structures remain an enigmatic Ediacaran fossil. A 2022 study suggests that Arumberia fossils record an extinct, filamentous, sessile organism, living between 560 and 520 millions of years ago.

== Taphonomy ==
=== Facies ===
The Ediacaran facies where Arumberia has been found are interpreted as terrigenous sedimentary rocks in shallow marine or fluviolacustrine (intertidal or delta plain) settings that may have been affected by desiccation and salinity. However, an alternative interpretation of the Ediacaran facies where Arumberia is found is that they were coastal gypsiferous paleosols of intertidal to supratidal settings. Terminal Ediacaran (560 Ma) facies in Baltica dominantly contain biomarkers (hopane and sterane ratios) characteristic of bacterially-dominated communities in shallow marine oligotrophic settings. These values reflect a high ratio of bacterial to eukaryotic biomass and suggest these ecosystems were nutrient-limited and dominated by bacterial communities, which may have imposed growth constraints and evolutionary modifications to Ediacaran organisms like Arumberia.

=== Burial compaction and diagenesis ===
The original interpretation of Arumberia as a conical or cup-shaped depression structure is contrary to modern interpretations of Arumberia as a bulge or impression. Extensive burial from overburden typical in areas where Arumberia is found would greatly compact any bulge or depression of a typical soft-bodied marine metazoan; however, it has been suggested that diagenic silicification, ferrugination or pyritization can provide critical fossil rigidity during burial which supports the soft-body marine metazoan description of Arumberia. The presence of pyrite may impart significant resistance to burial compaction in Arumberia, but to date no study has demonstrated a thick pyritic film of sufficient strength to withstand burial compaction above an unpyritized Ediacaran fossil, which is thought to be a requirement for the preservational models that involve the pyritization of soft-body metazoans like Arumberia.

Analysis of thin sections of Arumberia show remarkable resistance to compaction, which may have been due to the presence of a pyrite sole-veneer. The diagenetic oxidation of pyrite to hematite can remove all traces of the pyrite sole-veneer, so it is difficult to determine the true influence of pyritization on burial compaction in Arumberia. Alternatively, the remarkable resistance to burial compaction may be due to the presence of a resistant biopolymer like chitin which is typical in marine and terrestrial lichens alike Exactly how the fossils are preserved remains controversial, and more research into the taphonomy of Arumberia and other Ediacarans is needed.

== See also ==
- List of Ediacaran organisms
- Ediacaran biota
