= Milnererpeton =

Milnererpeton Temporal range: Late Carboniferous

Scientific classification
- Domain: Eukaryota
- Kingdom: Animalia
- Phylum: Chordata
- Order: †Temnospondyli
- Family: †Branchiosauridae
- Subfamily: †Branchiosaurinae
- Genus: †Milnererpeton; Hunt et al., 2002

Type species
- †Milnererpeton huberi (Hunt et al., 1996 [originally Milneria huberi])

Extinct genus of amphibians

Milnererpeton is an extinct genus of branchiosaurid temnospondyl amphibian from the Late Carboniferous of New Mexico. The genus was originally described in 1996 under the name Milneria, but since the name Milneria is preoccupied by a genus of mollusks, the name Milnererpeton was proposed as a replacement in 2002. The only species is Milnererpeton huberi.
