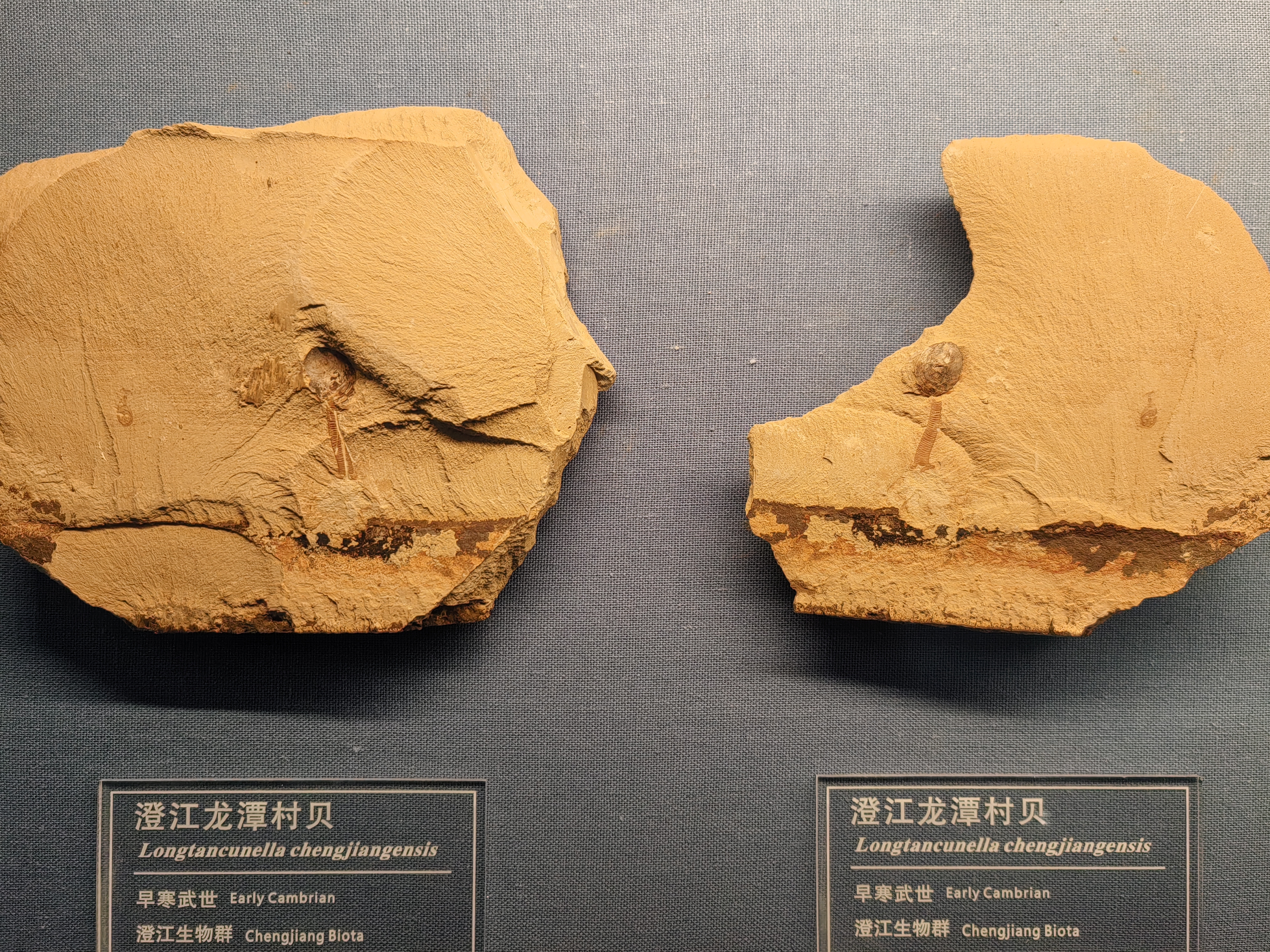
- Longtancunella chengjiangensis fossils

Scientific classification
- Kingdom: Animalia
- Phylum: Brachiopoda
- Class: †Chileata (?)
- Genus: †Longtancunella; Hou et al. 1999
- Species: †L. chengjiangensis

Binomial name
- †Longtancunella chengjiangensis Hou et al. 1999

= Longtancunella =

Longtancunella Temporal range: Cambrian Stage 3, 518 Ma

Extinct genus of brachiopods

Longtancunella is an extinct genus of brachiopod that lived during the Lower Cambrian. It was found in the Chengjiang Lagerstätte. Its pedicle, which resembles the modern Chileates', is often preserved; the organisms often live in clusters of around a dozen attached to the same basal object (usually a shell or exoskeleton).
