= Stenothecoida =

Stenothecoida Temporal range: Early–mid-Cambrian, 525–500 Ma

Scientific classification
- Kingdom: Animalia
- Superphylum: Lophotrochozoa
- Class: †Stenothecoida; Yochelson, 1968

Genera
- Stenothecoides Resser; Bagenovia Radugin; Cambridium Horný, 1957; Bagenoviella Aksarina; Sulcocarina Aksarina; Kaschkadakia Aksarina; Makarakia Aksarin; (given in JSTOR 1739764)

Extinct class of lophotrochozoans

Stenothecoida is a taxon of bivalved fossils from the Early to middle Cambrian period. They somewhat resemble brachiopods or bivalve molluscs.

== Affinity ==
Their affinity is uncertain. They were considered by E. L. Yochelson 1968 to belong to Mollusca, whereas Runnegar and Pojeta (1974) suggested that they might be 'bivalved monoplacophorans'. This said, the morphology of the shell does not resemble the shell of any other class of molluscs; they also look a little like brachiopods It's not clear whether their two valves are each other's mirror images, as in bivalve molluscs, though they aren't identical to one another [?]. It's more likely that the valves each have a single plane of symmetry (as in brachiopods), suggesting a brachiopod affiliation. There is also evidence for a pedicle, further supporting their brachiopod affinity.

As with many other Cambrian taxa, it has been suggested that they arise through reduction of a Halkieria-like ancestor.

== Mineralogy ==
Thought to be low-Mg calcite.

== Occurrence ==
The earliest occurrence dates to 525 Ma.

These fossil shells have been found in Canada, China, Greenland, Kazakhstan, Kyrgyzstan, and the USA.
