= List of freshwater aquarium amphibian species =

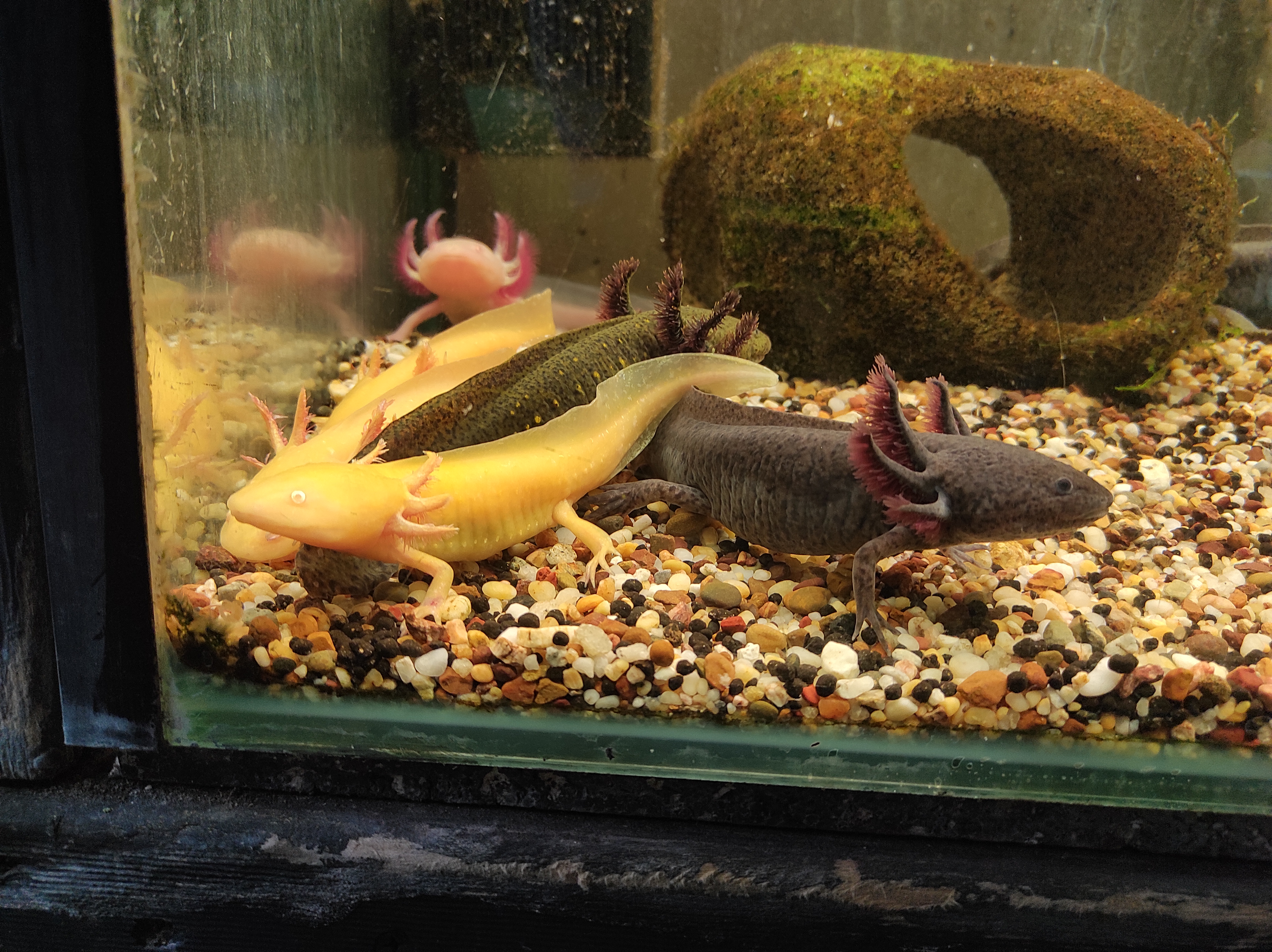
Axolotls in an aquarium

There are a wide range of frogs, salamanders and caecilians that can be kept as pets in an aquarium. Many of these are not found in the pet trade. This is usually because they're either too big for most commercial aquariums (ex: giant salamanders), are endangered (ex: achoques), haven't entered the pet trade yet, or a mix of the three.

All of the animals on this list are fully aquatic, meaning they can live without access to land. However, many still need to breathe air, as they lack gills in their adult phase.

== Frogs (Order Anura) ==
=== Pipidae ===
Genus	Species	Common name	Distribution	Status	Image
Pipa	Pipa arrabali	Arrabal's Surinam toad		LC	
Pipa	Pipa aspera	Albina Surinam toad		LC	
Pipa	Pipa carvalhoi	Carvalho's Surinam toad		LC	
Pipa	Pipa myersi	Myers' Surinam toad		EN	
Pipa	Pipa parva	Sabana Surinam toad		LC	
Pipa	Pipa pipa	Surinam toad		LC	
Pipa	Pipa snethlageae	Utinga Surinam toad		LC	
Pseudhymenochirus	Pseudhymenochirus merlini	Merlin's dwarf gray frog		LC	
Hymenochirus	Hymenochirus boettgeri	Zaire dwarf clawed frog		LC	
Hymenochirus	Hymenochirus boulengeri	Eastern dwarf clawed frog		DD	
Hymenochirus	Hymenochirus curtipes	Western dwarf clawed frog		LC	
Hymenochirus	Hymenochirus feae	Gaboon dwarf clawed frog		DD	
Xenopus	Xenopus allofraseri	False Fraser's clawed frog		LC	
Xenopus	Xenopus amieti	Volcano clawed frog		VU	
Xenopus	Xenopus andrei	Andre's clawed frog		LC	
Xenopus	Xenopus borealis	Marsabit clawed frog		LC	
Xenopus	Xenopus boumbaensis	Mawa clawed frog		NT	
Xenopus	Xenopus calcaratus	Biafran clawed frog		DD	
Xenopus	Xenopus clivii	Eritrea clawed frog		LC	
Xenopus	Xenopus epitropicalis	Cameroon clawed frog		LC	
Xenopus	Xenopus eysoole	Bamiléké clawed frog		DD	
Xenopus	Xenopus fischbergi	Fischberg's clawed frog		LC	
Xenopus	Xenopus fraseri	Fraser's platanna		DD	
Xenopus	Xenopus gilli	Cape platanna		EN	
Xenopus	Xenopus itombwensis	Itombwe massif clawed frog		EN	
Xenopus	Xenopus kobeli	Kobel's clawed frog		DD	
Xenopus	Xenopus laevis	African clawed frog		LC	
Xenopus	Xenopus largeni	Largen's clawed frog		EN	
Xenopus	Xenopus lenduensis	Lendu Plateau clawed frog		CR	
Xenopus	Xenopus longipes	Lake Oku clawed frog		CR	
Xenopus	Xenopus mellotropicalis	Cameroon clawed frog		LC	
Xenopus	Xenopus muelleri	Müller's platanna		LC	
Xenopus	Xenopus parafraseri	Upland clawed frog		LC	
Xenopus	Xenopus petersii	Peters' platanna		LC	
Xenopus	Xenopus poweri	N/A		LC	
Xenopus	Xenopus pygmaeus	Bouchia clawed frog		LC	
Xenopus	Xenopus ruwenzoriensis	Uganda clawed frog		DD	
Xenopus	Xenopus tropicalis	Western clawed frog		LC	
Xenopus	Xenopus vestitus	Kivu clawed frog		LC	
Xenopus	Xenopus victorianus	Lake Victoria clawed frog		LC	
Xenopus	Xenopus wittei	De Witte's clawed frog		LC	

=== Telmatobiidae ===
Genus	Species	Common name	Distribution	Status	Image
Telmatobius	Telmatobius culeus	Titicaca water frog		EN	
Telmatobius	Telmatobius macrostomus	Lake Junin frog		EN	
Telmatobius	Telmatobius mayoloi	N/A		EN	

== Salamanders (Order Urodela) ==
=== Giant salamanders (Cryptobranchidae) ===
Genus	Species	Common name	Distribution	Status	Image
Andrias	Andrias japonicus	Japanese giant salamander		VU	
Andrias	Andrias davidianus	Chinese giant salamander		CR	
Andrias	Andrias sligoi	South China giant salamander		CR	
Andrias	Andrias jiangxiensis	Jiangxi giant salamander		NE	
Andrias	Andrias cheni	Qimen giant salamander		NE	
Cryptobranchus	Cryptobranchus alleganiensis	Hellbender		VU	

=== Sirens (Sirenidae) ===
Genus	Species	Common name	Distribution	Status	Image
Pseudobranchus	Pseudobranchus striatus	Northern dwarf siren		LC	
Pseudobranchus	Pseudobranchus axanthus	Southern dwarf siren		LC	
Siren	Siren reticulata	Reticulated siren		VU	
Siren	Siren nettingi	Western siren		NE	
Siren	Siren sphagnicola	Seepage siren		NE	
Siren	Siren lacertina	Greater siren		LC	
Siren	Siren intermedia	Lesser siren		LC	

=== Newts (Pleurodelinae) ===
Genus	Species	Common name	Distribution	Status	Image
Pleurodeles	Pleurodeles nebulosus	Algerian ribbed newt			
Pleurodeles	Pleurodeles waltl	Iberian ribbed newt			
	Calotriton asper	Pyrenean brook newt			
	Triturus dobrogicus	Danube crested newt			
	Euproctus montanus	Corsican brook newt			
	Euproctus platycephalus	Sardinian brook newt			
Pachytriton	Pachytriton airobranchiatus	N/A			
Pachytriton	Pachytriton archospotus	N/A			
Pachytriton	Pachytriton brevipes	Spotted paddle-tail newt			
Pachytriton	Pachytriton changi	N/A			
Pachytriton	Pachytriton feii	N/A			
Pachytriton	Pachytriton granulosus	N/A			
Pachytriton	Pachytriton inexpectatus	N/A			
Pachytriton	Pachytriton moi	N/A			
Pachytriton	Pachytriton wuguanfui	N/A			
Pachytriton	Pachytriton xanthospilos	N/A			
Cynops	Cynops cyanurus	Chuxiong fire-bellied newt			
Cynops	Cynops ensicauda	Sword-tail newt			
Cynops	Cynops orientalis	Chinese fire belly newt			
Cynops	Cynops pyrrhogaster	Japanese fire-bellied newt			
Cynops	Cynops wolterstorffi	Yunnan lake newt		EX	
Paramesotriton					

- Spotless stout newt - (Paramesotriton labiatus)

=== Tiger salamanders (Ambystomatidae) ===
Genus	Species	Common name	Distribution	Status	Image
Ambystoma	Ambystoma andersoni	Anderson's salamander		CR	
Ambystoma	Ambystoma dumerilii	Achoque		CR	
Ambystoma	Ambystoma mexicanum	Axolotl		CR	
Ambystoma	Ambystoma taylori	Taylor's salamander		CR	

=== Proteidae ===
Genus	Species	Common name	Distribution	Status	Image
Necturus	Necturus alabamensis	Alabama waterdog		VU	
Necturus	Necturus beyeri	Western waterdog		LC	
Necturus	Necturus lewisi	Neuse River waterdog		LC	
Necturus	Necturus louisianensis	Red River mudpuppy		LC	
Necturus	Necturus maculosus	Common mudpuppy		LC	
Necturus	Necturus moleri	Apalachicola waterdog		LC	
Necturus	Necturus mounti	Escambia waterdog		LC	
Necturus	Necturus punctatus	Dwarf waterdog		LC	
Proteus	Proteus anguinus	Olm		VU	

=== Amphiumas (Amphiumidae) ===
Genus	Species	Common name	Distribution	Status	Image
Amphiuma	Amphiuma pholeter	One-toed amphiuma		LC	
Amphiuma	Amphiuma means	Two-toed amphiuma		LC	
Amphiuma	Amphiuma tridactylum	Three-toed amphiuma		LC	

== Caecilians (Order Gymnophiona) ==
=== Aquatic caecilians (Typhlonectidae) ===
Genus	Species	Common name	Distribution	Status	Image
Atretochoana	Atretochoana eiselti	Eiselt's caecillian		LC	
Potamotyphlus	Potamotyphlus kaupii	Kaup's caecilian		NE	
Typhlonectes	Typhlonectes compressicauda	Cayenne caecillian		LC	
Typhlonectes	Typhlonectes natans	Rubber eel		LC	

== See also ==
- List of fish common names
- List of freshwater aquarium plant species
- List of freshwater aquarium fish species
- List of freshwater aquarium invertebrate species
- List of brackish aquarium fish species
- List of marine aquarium fish species
- List of marine aquarium invertebrate species

== Footnotes ==
=== Notes ===
a: Conservation status at a world level of the species according to the IUCN Red List: Conservation status - IUCN Red List of Threatened Species:

EX - Extinct, EW - Extinct in the wild
CR - Critically endangered, EN - Endangered, VU - Vulnerable
NT - Near threatened, LC - Least concern
DD - Data deficient, NE - Not evaluated
