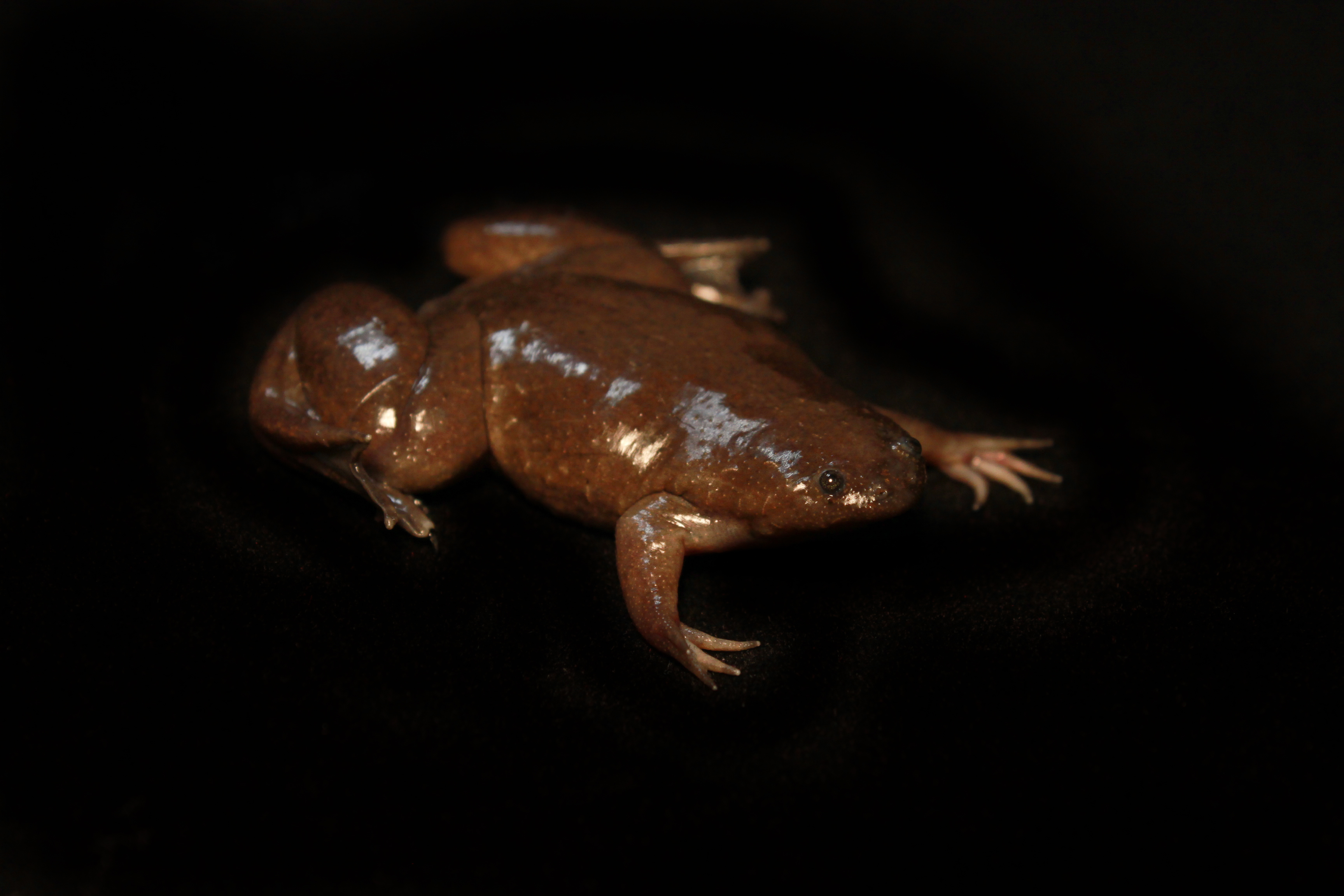
- Cameroon clawed frog (S. epitropicalis)

Scientific classification
- Kingdom: Animalia
- Phylum: Chordata
- Class: Amphibia
- Order: Anura
- Family: Pipidae
- Genus: Xenopus
- Subgenus: Silurana; Gray, 1864

Type species
- Silurana tropicalis Gray, 1864

= Silurana =

Subgenus of amphibians

Silurana is a subgenus of frogs in the family Pipidae. They are closely related the clawed frog subgenus, Xenopus.

== Species ==
- Cameroon clawed frog (S. epitropicalis)
- Tropical clawed frog (S. tropicalis)
- Gabonese clawed frog (S. mellotropicalis)
- Biafran clawed frog (S. calcaratus)
