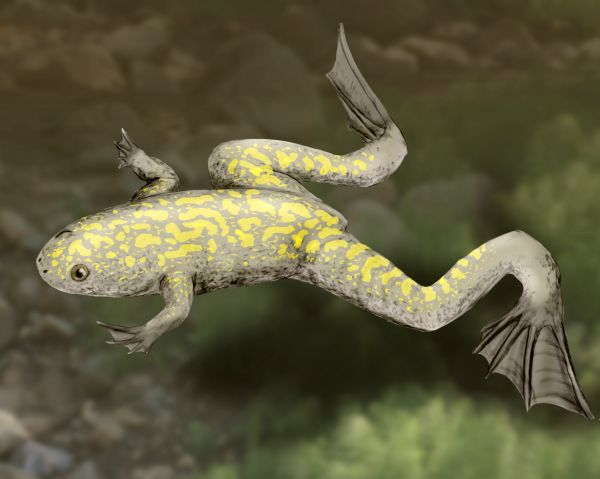

Scientific classification
- Domain: Eukaryota
- Kingdom: Animalia
- Phylum: Chordata
- Class: Amphibia
- Order: Anura
- Family: Pipidae
- Genus: †Singidella; Báez and Harrison, 2005

Type species
- †S. latecostata Báez and Harrison, 2005

= Singidella =

Singidella Temporal range: Middle Eocene (Lutetian)

Extinct genus of amphibians

Singidella is an extinct genus of prehistoric frog from the Eocene of Tanzania. There is currently only one described species, S. latecostata. Its generic name is derived from Singida, the city near which the only known specimens were found, and the specific name translates as "wide ribs" from Latin. It is a member of the family Pipidae and is closely related to the extant African dwarf frogs (Hymenochirus) and Merlin's dwarf gray frog (Pseudohymenochirus) and the Cretaceous frog Pachycentrata of Niger. Adult individuals were estimated at 41-45 mm in length from snout to vent.

It inhabited a maar lake deposited in what is now the Mahenge Formation.

== See also ==
- Prehistoric amphibian
- List of prehistoric amphibians
