= Xenopus boumbaensis =

Conservation status
- Near Threatened (IUCN 3.1)

Scientific classification
- Kingdom: Animalia
- Phylum: Chordata
- Class: Amphibia
- Order: Anura
- Family: Pipidae
- Genus: Xenopus
- Species: X. boumbaensis

Binomial name
- Xenopus boumbaensis Loumont, 1983

Species of amphibian

Xenopus boumbaensis, the Mawa clawed frog, is a predominantly to fully aquatic species of frog in the family Pipidae, known from a few localities in central and southern Cameroon, the northwestern Republic of the Congo and the extreme southwest of the Central African Republic. The species likely occurs more widely throughout the Central African forest region, but identification is difficult as it is a cryptic species, resembling Xenopus fraseri; however, X. boumbaensis is distinguishable by chromosome number (2n=72) and the species' male advertisement call, consisting of a single note.

== Etymology ==
The specific name boumbaensis refers to the type locality (Mawa) that is within the Boumba River drainage.

== Description ==
Adult males can grow to 37 mm (1.5 in) and females to 53 mm (2.1 in) in snout–vent length. All Xenopus are characterized by a streamlined and flattened body, a vocal organ specialized for underwater sound production, lateral-line organs, claws on the innermost three toes, and fully webbed toes. The coloration is green with numerous spots posteriorly and on the hind limbs. The venter can be immaculate white but is often heavily spotted.

Xenopus boumbaensis is an octoploid species (2n=72).

== Habitat and conservation ==
This species occurs in aquatic habitats in the lowland rainforest region at elevations of 337–550 m (1,106–1,804 ft) above sea level. It is typically found in forested habitats in slow-flowing forest streams and springs, but may also be found in swamps. Reproduction presumably involves free-living larvae. It is threatened by deforestation and habitat degradation as well as water pollution. It is known from a number of protected areas: Boumba Bek, Nki, and Lobeke National Parks in Cameroon, Dzanga-Sangha Special Reserve in the Central African Republic, and the Odzala-Kokoua National Park in the Republic of Congo.
