= Mahenge Formation =

Geological formation in Tanzania

- Stratigraphic range: Middle Eocene (Lutetian)
- Type: Sedimentary
- Overlies: Precambrian basement (Nyanzian Belt)

Lithology
- Primary: Mudstone, shale

Location
- Coordinates: 4.8°S 34.3°E
- Approximate paleocoordinates: 18.0°S 33.0°E
- Country: Tanzania

Type section
- Named for: Mahenge
- Mahenge Formation (Tanzania)

The Mahenge Formation is a Middle Eocene-aged geological formation and Konservat-Lagerstätte from Tanzania. It contains a high variety of exceptionally-preserved fossils, including many of the earliest fossil records of dominant freshwater fish groups found in Africa today. It represents one of the most comprehensive Paleogene-aged African fossil deposits south of the Sahara. Based on fossil plant remains found in the formation, the Mahenge lake was situated within legume-dominated woodlands reminiscent of modern miombo forests.

It was deposited within a former maar lake formed from a volcanic intrusion into the Precambrian bedrock via a kimberlite pipe. It has been dated to the Lutetian, roughly 46.0 million years ago. Unusually, relatively few fossil insect remains are known from the lake, unlike with other maar deposits. It is thought that the high diversity of fish in the lake may have led to most insects being consumed before they could be fossilized.

== Paleobiota ==
Color key
Taxon	Reclassified taxon	Taxon falsely reported as present	Dubious taxon or junior synonym	Ichnotaxon	Ootaxon	Morphotaxon

Notes
Uncertain or tentative taxa are in small text; ~~crossed out~~ taxa are discredited.

=== Bony fish ===
Genus	Species	Material	Notes	Images
Chaulopareion	C. mahengeense		An osteoglossid.	
Chrysichthys	C. mahengeensis		A claroteid catfish.	
Eocitharinus	E. macrognathus		A citharinid.	
Mahengecharax	M. carrolli		A potential alestid characiform, taxonomic identity disputed.	
Mahengechromis	M. brachycranium		A cichlid, forming a species flock.	
Mahengechromis	M. curvifrons		A cichlid, forming a species flock.	
Mahengechromis	M. ellipticus		A cichlid, forming a species flock.	
Mahengechromis	M. plethos		A cichlid, forming a species flock.	
Mahengechromis	M. rotundus		A cichlid, forming a species flock.	
Mahengichthys	M. singidaensis		A shellear.	
Palaeodenticeps	P. tanganikae		A relative of the denticle herring.	
Singida	S. jacksonoides		A singidid osteoglossiform.	

=== Amphibians ===
Genus	Species	Material	Notes	Images
Singidella	S. laticostata		A pipid frog.	

=== Mammals ===
Genus	Species	Material	Notes	Images
Tanzanycteris	T. mannardi		A tanzanycterid bat.	

=== Insects ===
Genus	Species	Material	Notes	Images
Mahengea	M. mckayi		A scarab beetle.	

=== Plants ===
Genus	Species	Material	Notes	Images
Acacia	A. mahengensis		An acacia.	
Aphanocalyx	A. singidaensis		A legume.	
cf. Cynometra	C. sp.		A legume.	
