= Xenopus allofraseri =

Conservation status
- Least Concern (IUCN 3.1)

Scientific classification
- Kingdom: Animalia
- Phylum: Chordata
- Class: Amphibia
- Order: Anura
- Family: Pipidae
- Genus: Xenopus
- Species: X. allofraseri

Binomial name
- Xenopus allofraseri Evans, Carter, Greenbaum, Gvozdík, Kelley, McLaughlin, Pauwels, Portik, Stanley et al., 2015

Species of frog

Xenopus allofraseri, the false Fraser's frog, is a species of frog native to Central and Western Africa. It inhabits wetlands and forests in countries such as the Democratic Republic of Congo, Guinea and Angola. It occurs in elevations from 30 to 1,218 m (98 to 3,996 ft). It's a Least Concern species on the IUCN Red List, though populations are decreasing.
