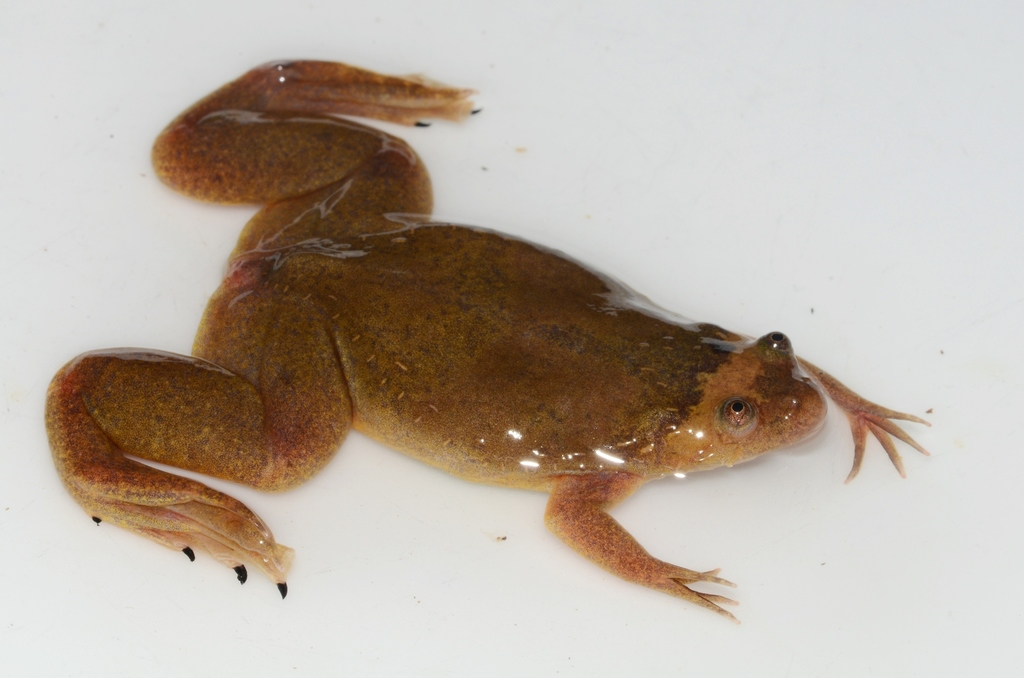

Conservation status
- Least Concern (IUCN 3.1)

Scientific classification
- Kingdom: Animalia
- Phylum: Chordata
- Class: Amphibia
- Order: Anura
- Family: Pipidae
- Genus: Xenopus
- Species: X. parafraseri

Binomial name
- Xenopus parafraseri Evans, Carter, Greenbaum, Gvozdík, Kelley, McLaughlin, Pauwels, Portik, Stanley et al., 2015

= Xenopus parafraseri =

Species of frog

Xenopus parafraseri, the upland clawed frog, is an endemic species of frog in Gabon, Congo, and Cameroon in Central and West Africa. It's a Least Concern species on the IUCN Red List, although populations are declining. It lives in forests and wetlands, and in elevations of up to 420 to 715 m (1,378 to 2,346 ft).
