= Xenopus lenduensis =

Conservation status
- Critically Endangered (IUCN 3.1)

Scientific classification
- Kingdom: Animalia
- Phylum: Chordata
- Class: Amphibia
- Order: Anura
- Family: Pipidae
- Genus: Xenopus
- Species: X. lenduensis

Binomial name
- Xenopus lenduensis Evans, Greenbaum, Kusamba, Carter, Tobias, Mendel & Kelley, 2011

Species of amphibian

Xenopus lenduensis, the Lendu Plateau clawed frog, is a species of frog in the family Pipidae endemic to the Orientale Province of the Democratic Republic of the Congo.
