= Xenopus eysoole =

Conservation status
- Data Deficient (IUCN 3.1)

Scientific classification
- Kingdom: Animalia
- Phylum: Chordata
- Class: Amphibia
- Order: Anura
- Family: Pipidae
- Genus: Xenopus
- Species: X. eysoole

Binomial name
- Xenopus eysoole Evans, Carter, Greenbaum, Gvozdík, Kelley, McLaughlin, Pauwels, Portik, Stanley et al., 2015

Species of frog

Xenopus eysoole, the Bamiléké clawed frog, is a species of frog from the genus Xenopus. It inhabits wetlands in its native area Cameroon, and it occurs in elevations of 1,100 to 2,175 m (3,609 to 7,136 ft).
