= Xenopus kobeli =

Conservation status
- Data Deficient (IUCN 3.1)

Scientific classification
- Kingdom: Animalia
- Phylum: Chordata
- Class: Amphibia
- Order: Anura
- Family: Pipidae
- Genus: Xenopus
- Species: X. kobeli

Binomial name
- Xenopus kobeli Evans, Carter, Greenbaum, Gvoždík, Kelley, McLaughlin, Pauwels, Portik, Stanley, Tinsley, Tobias, & Blackburn, 2015

Species of frog

Xenopus kobeli, the Kobel's clawed frog, is a species of clawed frog endemic to Cameroon where it inhabits wetlands. Elevations at which it occurs lies between 1,388 and 1,516 m (4,554 and 4,974 ft).
