= Xenopus fischbergi =

Conservation status
- Least Concern (IUCN 3.1)

Scientific classification
- Kingdom: Animalia
- Phylum: Chordata
- Class: Amphibia
- Order: Anura
- Family: Pipidae
- Genus: Xenopus
- Species: X. fischbergi

Binomial name
- Xenopus fischbergi Evans, Carter, Greenbaum, Gvozdík, Kelley, McLaughlin, Pauwels, Portik, Stanley et al., 2015

Species of frog

Xenopus fischbergi, the Fischberg's clawed frog, is a species of frog native to Central and Western Africa. It occurs in habitats such as savannas and wetlands. It can be found in elevations between 120 and 550 m (390 and 1,800 ft). It is listed as Least Concern on the IUCN Red List and populations are stable.
