= Ploidy =

Number of sets of chromosomes of a cell

A haploid set that consists of a single complete set of chromosomes (equal to the monoploid set), as shown in the picture above, must belong to a diploid species. If a haploid set consists of two sets, it must be of a tetraploid (four sets) species.

Ploidy (/ˈplɔɪdi/) is the number of complete sets of chromosomes in a cell, and hence the number of possible alleles for autosomal and pseudoautosomal genes. Here sets of chromosomes refers to the number of maternal and paternal chromosome copies, respectively, in each homologous chromosome pair—the form in which chromosomes naturally exist. Somatic cells, tissues, and individual organisms can be described according to the number of sets of chromosomes present (the "ploidy level"): monoploid (1 set), diploid (2 sets), triploid (3 sets), tetraploid (4 sets), pentaploid (5 sets), hexaploid (6 sets), heptaploid or septaploid (7 sets), etc. The generic term polyploid is often used to describe cells with three or more sets of chromosomes.

Virtually all sexually reproducing organisms are made up of somatic cells that are diploid or greater, but ploidy level may vary widely between different organisms, between different tissues within the same organism, and at different stages in an organism's life cycle. Half of all known plant genera contain polyploid species, and about two-thirds of all grasses are polyploid. Many animals are uniformly diploid, though polyploidy is common in invertebrates, reptiles, and amphibians. In some species, ploidy varies between individuals of the same species (as in the social insects), and in others entire tissues and organ systems may be polyploid despite the rest of the body being diploid (as in the mammalian liver). For many organisms, especially plants and fungi, changes in ploidy level between generations are major drivers of speciation. In mammals and birds, ploidy changes are typically fatal. There is, however, evidence of polyploidy in organisms now considered to be diploid, suggesting that polyploidy has contributed to evolutionary diversification in plants and animals through successive rounds of polyploidization and rediploidization.

Humans are diploid organisms, normally carrying two complete sets of chromosomes in their somatic cells: one copy of paternal and maternal chromosomes, respectively, in each of the 23 homologous pairs of chromosomes that humans normally have. This results in two homologous chromosomes within each of the 23 homologous pairs, providing a full complement of 46 chromosomes. This total number of individual chromosomes (counting all complete sets) is called the chromosome number or chromosome complement. The number of chromosomes found in a single complete set of chromosomes is called the monoploid number (x). The haploid number (n) refers to the total number of chromosomes found in a gamete (a sperm cell or egg cell produced by meiosis in preparation for sexual reproduction). Under normal conditions, the haploid number is exactly half the total number of chromosomes present in the organism's somatic cells, with one paternal and maternal copy in each chromosome pair. For diploid organisms, the monoploid number and haploid number are equal; in humans, both are equal to 23. When a human germ cell undergoes meiosis, the diploid 46 chromosome complement is split in half to form haploid gametes. After fusion of a male and a female gamete (each containing 1 set of 23 chromosomes) during fertilization, the resulting zygote again has the full complement of 46 chromosomes: 2 sets of 23 chromosomes. Any organism having a number of chromosomes that is an exact multiple of the number in a typical gamete of is species is called euploid, while if it has any other number it is called aneuploid. For example, a person with Turner syndrome may be missing one sex chromosome (X or Y), resulting in a (45,X) karyotype instead of the usual (46,XX) or (46,XY). This is a type of aneuploidy, and cells from the person may be said to be aneuploid with a (diploid) chromosome complement of 45.

== Etymology ==
The term ploidy is a back-formation from haploidy and diploidy. "Ploid" is a combination of Ancient Greek -πλόος (-plóos, "-fold") and -ειδής (-eidḗs), from εἶδος (eîdos, "form, likeness"). (Note: Compare the etymology of tuple, from the Latin for "-fold".) The principal meaning of the Greek word ᾰ̔πλόος (haplóos) is "single", from ἁ- (ha-, "one, same"). διπλόος (diplóos) means "duplex" or "two-fold". Diploid therefore means "duplex-shaped" (compare "humanoid", "human-shaped").

Polish-German botanist Eduard Strasburger coined the terms haploid and diploid in 1905. (Note: The original text in German is as follows: "Schließlich wäre es vielleicht erwünscht, wenn den Bezeichnungen Gametophyt und Sporophyt, die sich allein nur auf Pflanzen mit einfacher und mit doppelter Chromosomenzahl anwenden lassen, solche zur Seite gestellt würden, welche auch für das Tierreich passen. Ich erlaube mir zu diesem Zwecke die Worte Haploid und Diploid, bezw. haploidische und diploidische Generation vorzuschlagen.") Some authors suggest that Strasburger based the terms on August Weismann's conception of the id (or germ plasm), hence haplo-id and diplo-id. The two terms were brought into the English language from German through William Henry Lang's 1908 translation of a 1906 textbook by Strasburger and colleagues.

== Types of ploidy ==
=== Haploid and monoploid ===
A comparison of sexual reproduction in predominantly haploid organisms and predominantly diploid organisms. 1) A haploid organism is on the left and a diploid organism is on the right. 2 and 3) Haploid egg and sperm carrying the dominant purple gene and the recessive blue gene, respectively. These gametes are produced by simple mitosis of cells in the germ line. 4 and 5) Haploid sperm and egg carrying the recessive blue gene and the dominant purple gene, respectively. These gametes are produced by meiosis, which halves the number of chromosomes in the diploid germ cells. 6) The short-lived diploid state of haploid organisms, a zygote generated by the union of two haploid gametes during sex. 7) The diploid zygote which has just been fertilized by the union of haploid egg and sperm during sex. 8) Cells of the diploid structure quickly undergo meiosis to produce spores containing the meiotically halved number of chromosomes, restoring haploidy. These spores express either the mother's dominant gene or the father's recessive gene and proceed by mitotic division to build a new entirely haploid organism. 9) The diploid zygote proceeds by mitotic division to build a new entirely diploid organism. These cells possess both the purple and blue genes, but only the purple gene is expressed since it is dominant over the recessive blue gene.

The term haploid is used with two distinct but related definitions. In the most generic sense, haploid refers to having the number of sets of chromosomes normally found in a gamete (n). Because two gametes necessarily combine during sexual reproduction to form a single zygote from which somatic cells are generated, healthy gametes always possess exactly half the number of sets of chromosomes found in the somatic cells, and therefore "haploid" in this sense refers to having exactly half the number of sets of chromosomes found in a somatic cell. By this definition, an organism whose gametic cells contain a single copy of each chromosome (one set of chromosomes) may be considered haploid while the somatic cells, containing two copies of each chromosome (two sets of chromosomes), are diploid. This scheme of diploid somatic cells and haploid gametes is widely used in the animal kingdom and is the simplest to illustrate in diagrams of genetics concepts. But this definition also allows for haploid gametes with more than one set of chromosomes. As given above, gametes are by definition haploid, regardless of the actual number of sets of chromosomes they contain. An organism whose somatic cells are tetraploid (four sets of chromosomes), for example, will produce gametes by meiosis that contain two sets of chromosomes. These gametes might still be called haploid even though they are numerically diploid.

An alternative usage defines "haploid" as having a single copy of each chromosome – that is, one and only one set of chromosomes (x). In this case, the nucleus of a eukaryotic cell is said to be haploid only if it has a single set of chromosomes, each one not being part of a pair. By extension a cell may be called haploid if its nucleus has one set of chromosomes, and an organism may be called haploid if its body cells (somatic cells) have one set of chromosomes per cell. By this definition haploid therefore would not be used to refer to the gametes produced by the tetraploid organism in the example above, since these gametes are numerically diploid. The term monoploid is often used as a less ambiguous way to describe a single set of chromosomes.

Gametes (sperm and ova) are haploid cells. The haploid gametes produced by most organisms combine to form a zygote with n pairs of chromosomes, i.e. 2n chromosomes in total. The chromosomes in each pair, one of which comes from the sperm and one from the egg, are said to be homologous. Cells and organisms with pairs of homologous chromosomes are called diploid. For example, most animals are diploid and produce haploid gametes. During meiosis, sex cell precursors have their number of chromosomes halved by randomly "choosing" one member of each pair of chromosomes, resulting in haploid gametes. Because homologous chromosomes usually differ genetically, gametes usually differ genetically from one another.

All plants and many fungi and algae switch between a haploid and a diploid state, with one of the stages emphasized over the other. This is called alternation of generations. Most fungi and algae are haploid during the principal stage of their life cycle, as are some primitive plants like mosses. More recently evolved plants, like the gymnosperms and angiosperms, spend the majority of their life cycle in the diploid stage. Most animals are diploid, but male bees, wasps, and ants are haploid organisms because they develop from unfertilized, haploid eggs, while females (workers and queens) are diploid, making their system haplodiploid.

==== Ancestral ploidy levels ====
In some cases there is evidence that the n chromosomes in a haploid set have resulted from duplications of an originally smaller set of chromosomes. This "base" number – the number of apparently originally unique chromosomes in a haploid set – is called the monoploid number, also known as basic or cardinal number, or fundamental number. It is possible on rare occasions for ploidy to increase in the germline, which can result in polyploid offspring and ultimately polyploid species. This is an important evolutionary mechanism in both plants and animals and is known as a primary driver of speciation, making the distinction of monoploid vs haploid or x vs. n important.

Common wheat (Triticum aestivum) is an organism in which x and n differ. Each plant has a total of six sets of chromosomes (with two sets likely having been obtained from each of three different diploid species that are its distant ancestors). The somatic cells are hexaploid, 2n = 6x = 42 (where the monoploid number x = 7 and the haploid number n = 21). The gametes of common wheat are considered to be haploid, since they contain half the genetic information of somatic cells, but they are not monoploid, as they still contain three complete sets of chromosomes (n = 3x).

Tetraploidy (four sets of chromosomes, 2n = 4x) is common in many plant species, and also occurs in amphibians, reptiles, and insects. For example, species of Xenopus (African toads) form a ploidy series, featuring diploid (X. tropicalis, 2n = 2x = 20), tetraploid (X. laevis, 2n = 4x = 36), octaploid (X. wittei, 2n = 8x = 72), and dodecaploid (X. ruwenzoriensis, 2n = 12x = 108) species.

In the case of wheat, the origin of its haploid number of 21 chromosomes from three sets of 7 chromosomes can be demonstrated. In many other organisms, although the number of chromosomes may have originated in this way, this is no longer clear by karyotype, and the monoploid number is regarded as the same as the haploid number – for example:

- Humans are generally regarded as diploid (x = n = 23), but the 2R hypothesis has confirmed two rounds of whole genome duplication in early vertebrate ancestors.
- The "diploid" Brassica species are mesohexaploid. The ancestral chromosomes have fused into fewer chromosomes, but they remain discernable in rather large blocks.

Applying the temporal terms in polyploidy, the use of an x distinct from n is generally restricted to neopolyploidy, where the karyotype still allows for clear assignment of more than two sets of chromosomes.

=== Diploid ===
Karyogram of a typical human cell, showing a diploid set of 22 homologous autosomal chromosome pairs. It also shows both the female (XX) and male (XY) versions of the two sex chromosomes (at bottom right), as well as the mitochondrial genome (to scale at bottom left).

Diploid describes a cell or nucleus which contains two copies of genetic material, or a complete set of chromosomes, paired with their homologs (chromosome carrying the same information from the other parent). Diploid cells have two homologous copies of each chromosome, usually one from the mother and one from the father. All or nearly all mammals are diploid organisms. The suspected tetraploid (possessing four-chromosome sets) plains viscacha rat (Tympanoctomys barrerae) and golden viscacha rat (Pipanacoctomys aureus) have been regarded as the only known exceptions (as of 2004). However, some genetic studies have rejected any polyploidism in mammals as unlikely, and suggest that amplification and dispersion of repetitive sequences best explain the large genome size of these two rodents.

All normal diploid individuals have some small fraction of cells that display polyploidy. Human diploid cells have 46 chromosomes (the somatic number, 2n) and human haploid gametes (egg and sperm) have 23 chromosomes (n). Retroviruses that contain two copies of their RNA genome in each viral particle are also said to be diploid. Examples include human foamy virus, human T-lymphotropic virus, and HIV.

=== Polyploidy ===
Polyploidy is the state where all cells have multiple sets of chromosomes beyond the basic set, usually 3 or more. Specific terms are triploid (3 sets), tetraploid (4 sets), pentaploid (5 sets), hexaploid (6 sets), heptaploid or septaploid (7 sets), octoploid (8 sets), nonaploid (9 sets), decaploid (10 sets), undecaploid (11 sets), dodecaploid (12 sets), tridecaploid (13 sets), tetradecaploid (14 sets), etc. Some higher ploidies include hexadecaploid (16 sets), dotriacontaploid (32 sets), and tetrahexacontaploid (64 sets), though Greek terminology may be set aside for readability in cases of higher ploidy (such as "16-ploid"). Polytene chromosomes of plants and fruit flies can be 1024-ploid. Ploidy of systems such as the salivary gland, elaiosome, endosperm, and trophoblast can exceed this, up to 1048576-ploid in the silk glands of the commercial silkworm Bombyx mori.

The chromosome sets may be from the same species or from closely related species. In the latter case, these are known as allopolyploids (or amphidiploids, which are allopolyploids that behave as if they were normal diploids). Allopolyploids are formed from the hybridization of two separate species. In plants, this probably most often occurs from the pairing of meiotically unreduced gametes, and not by diploid–diploid hybridization followed by chromosome doubling. The so-called Brassica triangle is an example of allopolyploidy, where three different parent species have hybridized in all possible pair combinations to produce three new species.

Polyploidy occurs commonly in plants, but rarely in animals. Even in diploid organisms, many somatic cells are polyploid due to a process called endoreduplication, where duplication of the genome occurs without mitosis (cell division). The extreme in polyploidy occurs in the fern genus Ophioglossum, the adder's-tongues, in which polyploidy results in chromosome counts in the hundreds, or, in at least one case, well over one thousand.

It is possible for polyploid organisms to revert to lower ploidy by haploidisation.

==== In bacteria and archaea ====
Polyploidy is a characteristic of the bacterium Deinococcus radiodurans and of the archaeon Halobacterium salinarum. These two species are highly resistant to ionizing radiation and desiccation, conditions that induce DNA double-strand breaks. This resistance appears to be due to efficient homologous recombinational repair.

=== Variable or indefinite ploidy ===
Depending on growth conditions, prokaryotes such as bacteria may have a chromosome copy number of 1 to 4, and that number is commonly fractional, counting portions of the chromosome partly replicated at a given time. This is because under exponential growth conditions the cells are able to replicate their DNA faster than they can divide.

In ciliates, the macronucleus is called ampliploid, because only part of the genome is amplified.

=== Mixoploidy ===
Mixoploidy is the case where two cell lines, one diploid and one polyploid, coexist within the same organism. Though polyploidy in humans is not viable, mixoploidy has been found in live adults and children. There are two types: diploid-triploid mixoploidy, in which some cells have 46 chromosomes and some have 69, and diploid-tetraploid mixoploidy, in which some cells have 46 and some have 92 chromosomes. It is a major topic of cytology.

=== Dihaploidy and polyhaploidy ===
Dihaploid and polyhaploid cells are formed by haploidisation of polyploids, i.e., by halving the chromosome constitution.

Dihaploids (which are diploid, 2x) are important for selective breeding of tetraploid (4x) crop plants (notably potatoes), because selection is faster with diploids than with tetraploids. Tetraploids can be reconstituted from the diploids, for example by somatic fusion.

The term "dihaploid" was coined by Bender to combine in one word the number of genome copies (diploid) and their origin (haploid). The term is well established in this original sense, but it has also been used for doubled monoploids or doubled haploids, which are homozygous and used for genetic research.

=== Euploidy and aneuploidy ===
Euploidy (Greek eu, "true" or "even") is the state of a cell or organism having one or more than one set of the same set of chromosomes, possibly excluding the sex-determining chromosomes. For example, most human cells have 2 of each of the 23 homologous monoploid chromosomes, for a total of 46 chromosomes. A human cell with one extra set of the 23 normal chromosomes (functionally triploid) would be considered euploid. Euploid karyotypes would consequentially be a multiple of the haploid number, which in humans is 23.

Aneuploidy is the state where one or more individual chromosomes of a normal set are absent or present in more than their usual number of copies (excluding the absence or presence of complete sets, which is considered euploidy). Unlike euploidy, aneuploid karyotypes will not be a multiple of the haploid number. In humans, examples of aneuploidy include having a single extra chromosome (as in Down syndrome, where affected individuals have three copies of chromosome 21) or missing a chromosome (as in Turner syndrome, where affected individuals have only one sex chromosome). Aneuploid karyotypes are given names with the suffix -somy (rather than -ploidy, used for euploid karyotypes), such as trisomy and monosomy.

=== Homoploid ===
Homoploid means "at the same ploidy level", i.e. having the same number of homologous chromosomes. For example, homoploid hybridization is hybridization where the offspring have the same ploidy level as the two parental species. This contrasts with a common situation in plants where chromosome doubling accompanies or occurs soon after hybridization. Similarly, homoploid speciation contrasts with polyploid speciation.

=== Zygoidy and azygoidy ===
Zygoidy is the state in which the chromosomes are paired and can undergo meiosis. The zygoid state of a species may be diploid or polyploid (with respect to x; it can only be 2n by the definition of n). In the azygoid state the chromosomes are unpaired. The azygoid state may be the natural state of some asexual species or may occur after meiosis. In diploid (2x) organisms, the azygoid state is monoploid (x).

== Special cases ==
=== More than one nucleus per cell ===
In the strictest sense, ploidy refers to the number of sets of chromosomes in a single nucleus rather than in the cell as a whole. Because in most situations there is only one nucleus per cell, it is commonplace to speak of the ploidy of a cell, but in cases in which there is more than one nucleus per cell, more specific definitions are required when ploidy is discussed. Authors may at times report the total combined ploidy of all nuclei present within the cell membrane of a syncytium, though usually the ploidy of each nucleus is described individually. For example, a fungal dikaryon with two separate haploid nuclei is distinguished from a diploid cell in which the chromosomes share a nucleus and can be shuffled together.

=== Haplodiploidy ===
Ploidy can also vary between individuals of the same species or at different stages of the life cycle. In some insects it differs by caste. In humans, only the gametes are haploid, but in many of the social insects, including ants and bees, males develop from unfertilized eggs, making them haploid for their entire lives, even as adults.

In the Australian bulldog ant, Myrmecia pilosula, a haplodiploid species, haploid individuals of this species have a single chromosome and diploid individuals have two chromosomes. In Entamoeba, the ploidy level varies from 4n to 40n in a single population. Alternation of generations occurs in most plants, with individuals "alternating" ploidy level between different stages of their sexual life cycle.

=== Tissue-specific polyploidy ===
In large multicellular organisms, variations in ploidy level between different tissues, organs, or cell lineages are common. Because the chromosome number is generally reduced only by the specialized process of meiosis, the somatic cells of the body inherit and maintain the chromosome number of the zygote by mitosis. However, in many situations somatic cells double their copy number by means of endoreduplication as an aspect of cellular differentiation.

==== Cardiac polyploidy ====
For example, the hearts of two-year-old human children contain 85% diploid and 15% tetraploid nuclei, but by 12 years of age the proportions become approximately equal, and adults examined contained 27% diploid, 71% tetraploid and 2% octaploid nuclei.

==== Hepatic polyploidy ====
In hepatocyte polyploidization, liver cells (hepatocytes) acquire more than two complete sets of chromosomes, a characteristic feature of mammalian hepatocytes. At birth, all hepatocytes are diploid (2n), but during postnatal development — particularly around weaning in rodents and in early childhood in humans — they undergo polyploidization primarily through cytokinesis failure, leading to binucleated tetraploid (4n) or mononucleated polyploid cells. This process continues gradually with age, influenced by insulin signalling/Akt signaling, metabolic dysfunction, and cellular stress.

== Adaptive and ecological significance of variation in ploidy ==
There is continued study and debate regarding the fitness advantages or disadvantages conferred by different ploidy levels. A study comparing the karyotypes of endangered or invasive plants with those of their relatives found that being polyploid as opposed to diploid is associated with a 14% lower risk of being endangered, and a 20% greater chance of being invasive. Polyploidy may be associated with increased vigor and adaptability. Some studies suggest that selection is more likely to favor diploidy in host species and haploidy in parasite species. However, polyploidization is associated with an increase in transposable element content and relaxed purifying selection on recessive deleterious alleles.

When a germ cell with an uneven number of chromosomes undergoes meiosis, the chromosomes cannot be evenly divided between the daughter cells, resulting in aneuploid gametes. Triploid organisms, for instance, are usually sterile. Because of this, triploidy is commonly exploited in agriculture to produce seedless fruit such as bananas and watermelons. If the fertilization of human gametes results in three sets of chromosomes, the condition is called triploid syndrome.

In unicellular organisms the ploidy nutrient limitation hypothesis suggests that nutrient limitation should encourage haploidy in preference to higher ploidies. This hypothesis is due to the higher surface-to-volume ratio of haploids, which eases nutrient uptake, thereby increasing the internal nutrient-to-demand ratio. Mable 2001 finds Saccharomyces cerevisiae to be somewhat inconsistent with this hypothesis however, as haploid growth is faster than diploid under high nutrient conditions. The NLH is also tested in haploid, diploid, and polyploid fungi by Gerstein et al. 2017. This result is also more complex: On the one hand, under phosphorus and other nutrient limitation, lower ploidy is selected as expected. However under normal nutrient levels or under limitation of only nitrogen, higher ploidy was selected. Thus the NLH – and more generally, the idea that haploidy is selected by harsher conditions – is cast into doubt by these results.

Older WGDs have also been investigated. Only as recently as 2015 was the ancient whole genome duplication in Baker's yeast proven to be allopolyploid, by Marcet-Houben and Gabaldón 2015. It still remains to be explained why there are not more polyploid events in fungi, and the place of neopolyploidy and mesopolyploidy in fungal history.

== Less efficient natural selection in diploid compared to haploid tissue ==
The concept that those genes of an organism that are expressed exclusively in the diploid stage are under less efficient natural selection than those genes expressed in the haploid stage is referred to as the "masking theory". Evidence in support of this masking theory has been reported in studies of the single-celled yeast Saccharomyces cerevisiae. In further support of the masking theory, evidence of strong purifying selection in haploid tissue-specific genes has been reported for the plant Scots Pine.

== Glossary of ploidy numbers ==
Term	Description
Ploidy number	Number of chromosome sets
Monoploid number (x)	Number of chromosomes found in a single complete set
Chromosome number	Total number of chromosomes in all sets combined
Zygotic number	Number of chromosomes in zygotic cells
Haploid or gametic number (n)	Number of chromosomes found in gametes
Diploid number	Chromosome number of a diploid organism
Tetraploid number	Chromosome number of a tetraploid organism

The common potato (Solanum tuberosum) is an example of a tetraploid organism, carrying four sets of chromosomes. During sexual reproduction, each potato plant inherits two sets of 12 chromosomes from the pollen parent, and two sets of 12 chromosomes from the ovule parent. The four sets combined provide a full complement of 48 chromosomes. The haploid number (half of 48) is 24. The monoploid number equals the total chromosome number divided by the ploidy level of the somatic cells: 48 chromosomes in total divided by a ploidy level of 4 equals a monoploid number of 12. Hence, the monoploid number (12) and haploid number (24) are distinct in this example.

However, commercial potato crops (as well as many other crop plants) are commonly propagated vegetatively (by asexual reproduction through mitosis), in which case new individuals are produced from a single parent, without the involvement of gametes and fertilization, and all the offspring are genetically identical to each other and to the parent, including in chromosome number. The parents of these vegetative clones may still be capable of producing haploid gametes in preparation for sexual reproduction, but these gametes are not used to create the vegetative offspring by this route.

== Specific examples ==
Examples of various ploidy levels in species with x=11
Species	Ploidy	Number of chromosomes
Eucalyptus spp.	Diploid	2x = 22
Banana (Musa spp.)	Triploid	3x = 33
Coffea arabica	Tetraploid	4x = 44
Sequoia sempervirens	Hexaploid	6x = 66
Opuntia ficus-indica	Octoploid	8x = 88

List of common organisms by chromosome count
Species	Number of chromosomes	Ploidy number
Vinegar/fruit fly	8	2
Wheat	14, 28 or 42	2, 4 or 6
Crocodilian	32, 34, or 42	2
Apple	34, 51, or 68	2, 3 or 4
Human	46	2
Horse	64, 65, or 66	2
Chicken	78	2
Gold fish	100 or more	2 or polyploid

== Sources ==
- Griffiths AJ, et al. (2000). An introduction to genetic analysis (7th ed.). New York: W. H. Freeman. ISBN 0-7167-3520-2.
