= Eritrea clawed frog =

Conservation status
- Least Concern (IUCN 3.1)

Scientific classification
- Kingdom: Animalia
- Phylum: Chordata
- Class: Amphibia
- Order: Anura
- Family: Pipidae
- Genus: Xenopus
- Species: X. clivii

Binomial name
- Xenopus clivii Peracca, 1898

Species of amphibian

The Eritrea clawed frog or Peracca's clawed frog (Xenopus clivii) is a species of frog in the family Pipidae found in Eritrea, Ethiopia, Kenya, and Sudan. Its natural habitats are subtropical or tropical moist lowland forests, subtropical or tropical moist montane forests, dry savanna, moist savanna, subtropical or tropical dry shrubland, subtropical or tropical dry lowland grassland, subtropical or tropical high-altitude grassland, rivers, swamps, freshwater lakes, and freshwater marshes. It is threatened by habitat loss.
