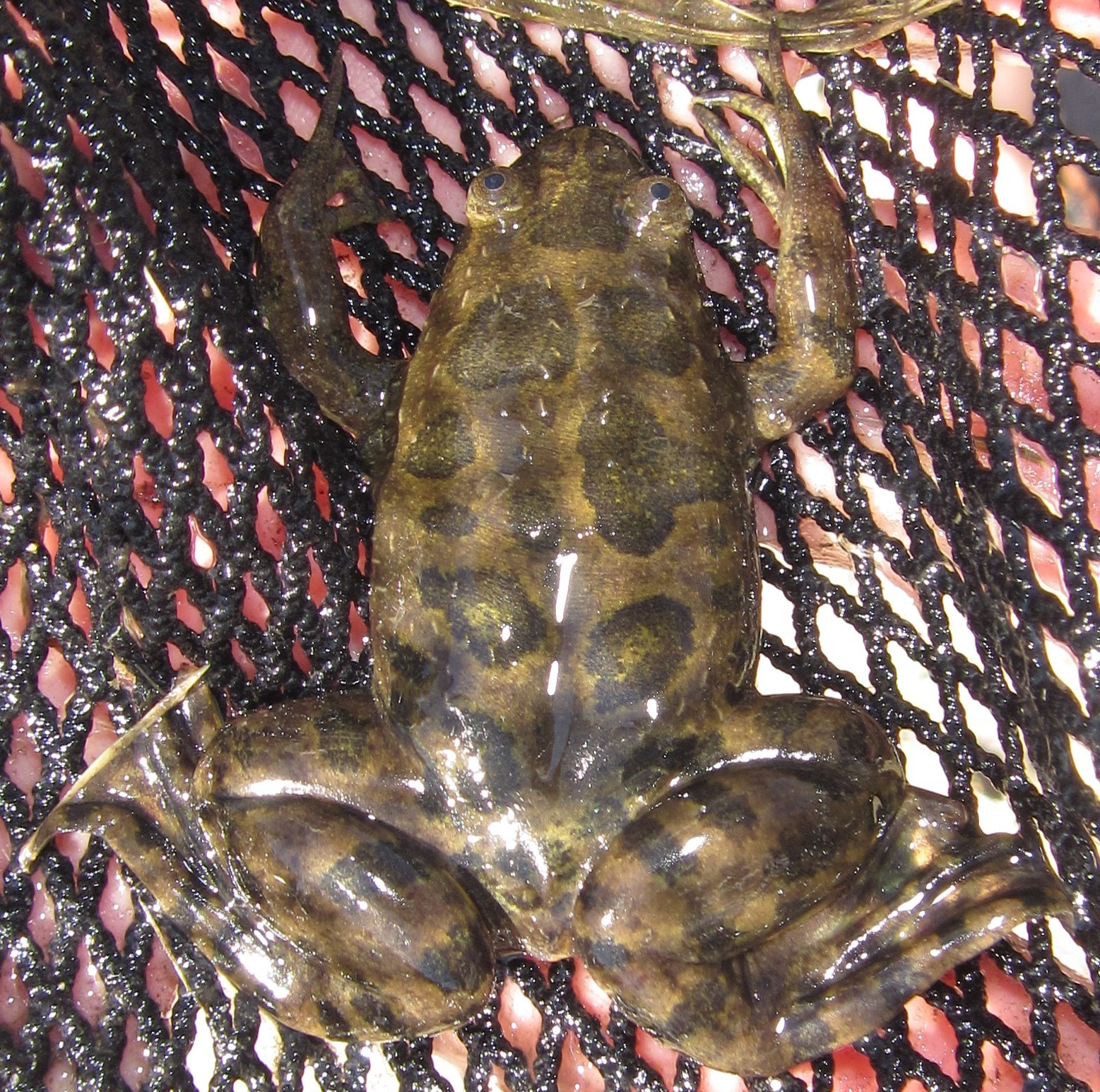

Conservation status
- Least Concern (IUCN 3.1)

Scientific classification
- Kingdom: Animalia
- Phylum: Chordata
- Class: Amphibia
- Order: Anura
- Family: Pipidae
- Genus: Xenopus
- Species: X. petersii

Binomial name
- Xenopus petersii Bocage, 1895

= Peters' platanna =

Species of frog

Peters' platanna (Xenopus petersii) is a species of frog in the family Pipidae found in Angola, Botswana, the Republic of the Congo, the Democratic Republic of the Congo, Gabon, Namibia, Zambia, Zimbabwe, and possibly Tanzania. Its natural habitats are subtropical or tropical moist lowland forests, dry savanna, moist savanna, subtropical or tropical dry shrubland, subtropical or tropical moist shrubland, subtropical or tropical dry lowland grassland, subtropical or tropical seasonally wet or flooded lowland grassland, subtropical or tropical high-altitude grassland, rivers, intermittent rivers, swamps, freshwater lakes, intermittent freshwater lakes, freshwater marshes, intermittent freshwater marshes, freshwater springs, arable land, pastureland, rural gardens, urban areas, heavily degraded former forests, water storage areas, ponds, open excavations, and canals and ditches.
