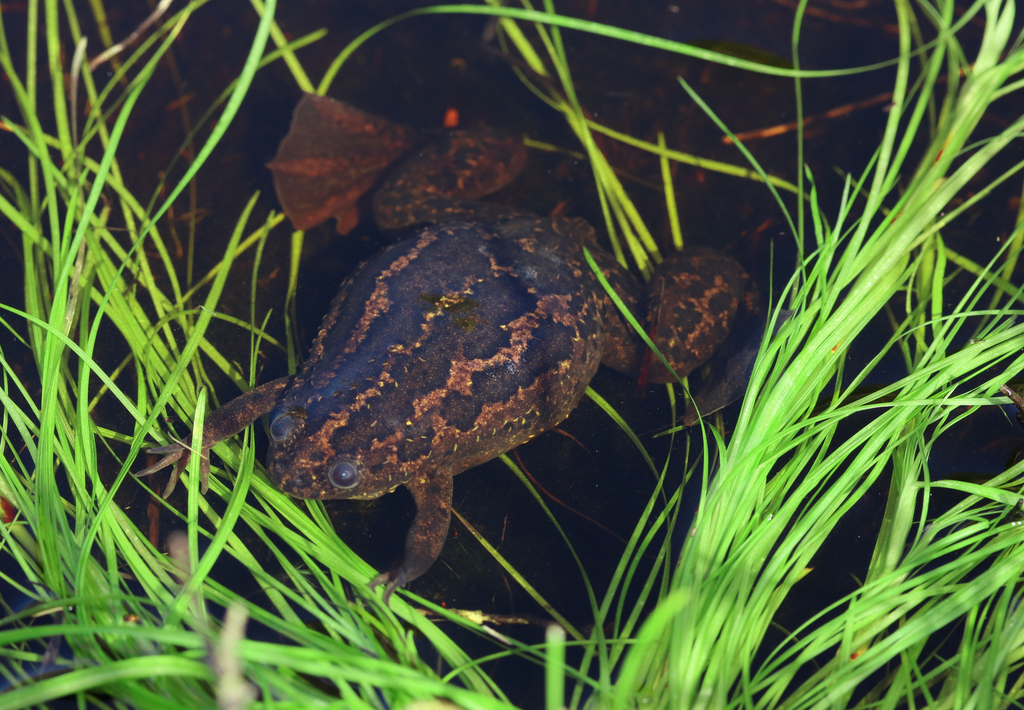

Conservation status
- Endangered (IUCN 3.1)

Scientific classification
- Kingdom: Animalia
- Phylum: Chordata
- Class: Amphibia
- Order: Anura
- Family: Pipidae
- Genus: Xenopus
- Species: X. gilli

Binomial name
- Xenopus gilli Rose & Hewitt, 1927

= Cape platanna =

Species of amphibian

The Cape clawed frog, Cape platanna or Gill's platanna (Xenopus gilli) is a species of frog in the family Pipidae endemic to South Africa. Its natural habitats are Mediterranean-type shrubby vegetation, freshwater marshes, intermittent freshwater marshes, and ponds. It is threatened by habitat loss and hybridization with Xenopus laevis.
