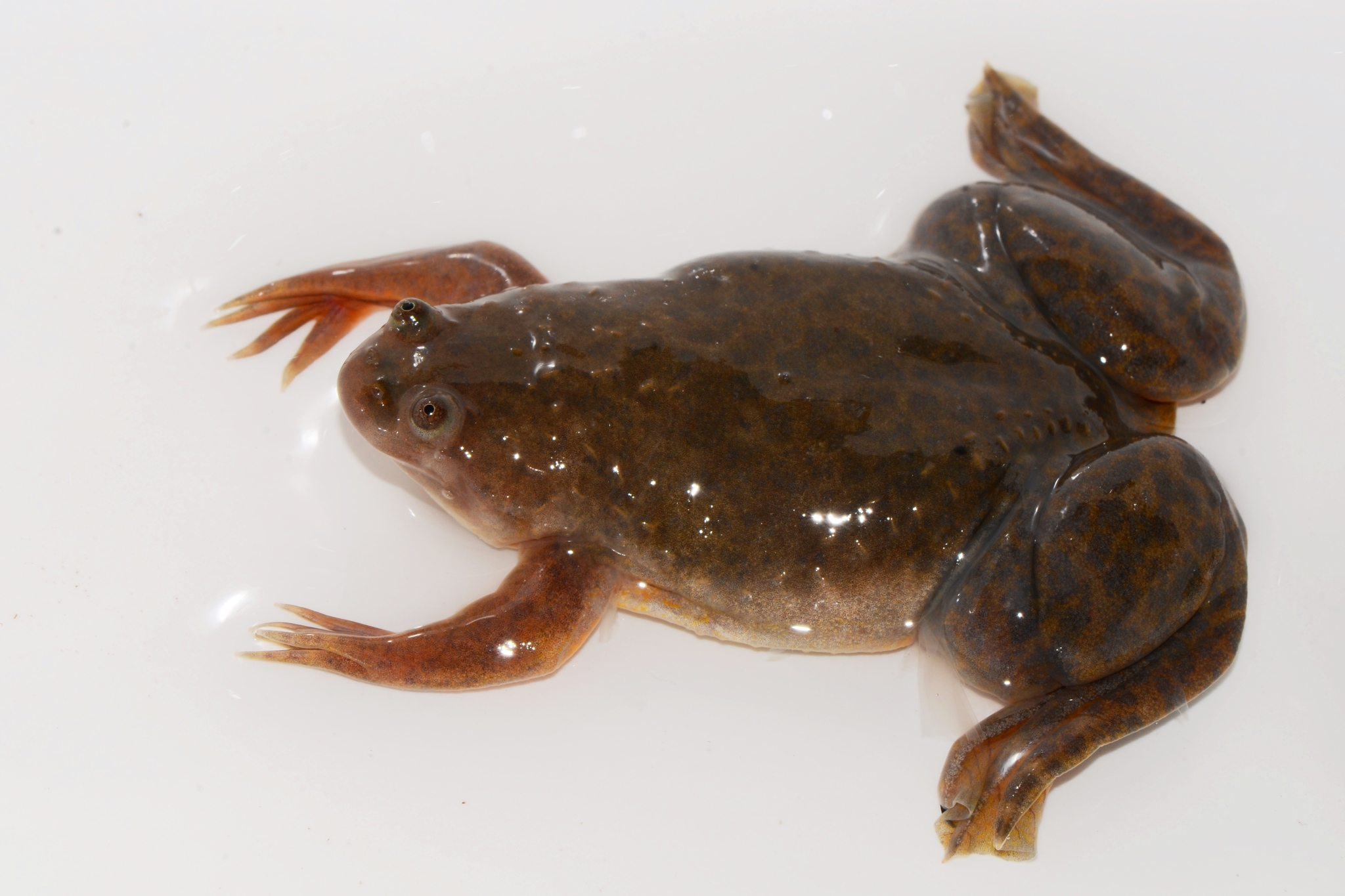

Conservation status
- Least Concern (IUCN 3.1)

Scientific classification
- Kingdom: Animalia
- Phylum: Chordata
- Class: Amphibia
- Order: Anura
- Family: Pipidae
- Genus: Xenopus
- Species: X. borealis

Binomial name
- Xenopus borealis Parker, 1936

= Marsabit clawed frog =

Species of amphibian

The Marsabit clawed frog (Xenopus borealis) is a species of frog in the family Pipidae found in Kenya, Tanzania, and possibly Uganda. Its natural habitats are subtropical or tropical high-altitude grassland, rivers, freshwater lakes, intermittent freshwater lakes, freshwater marshes, intermittent freshwater marshes, pastureland, and ponds.

== Distribution ==
The Marsabit clawed frog is only found in the upper elevations of the East African montane moorlands eco-region, and in the East African montane forests eco-region of south-eastern Africa.
