= Kivu clawed frog =

Conservation status
- Least Concern (IUCN 3.1)

Scientific classification
- Kingdom: Animalia
- Phylum: Chordata
- Class: Amphibia
- Order: Anura
- Family: Pipidae
- Genus: Xenopus
- Species: X. vestitus

Binomial name
- Xenopus vestitus Laurent, 1972

Species of amphibian

The Kivu clawed frog (Xenopus vestitus) is a species of frog in the family Pipidae found in the Democratic Republic of the Congo, Rwanda, and Uganda. Its natural habitats are subtropical or tropical moist montane forests, subtropical or tropical high-altitude grassland, rivers, swamps, freshwater lakes, intermittent freshwater lakes, freshwater marshes, intermittent freshwater marshes, arable land, pastureland, rural gardens, water storage areas, ponds, and aquaculture ponds.
