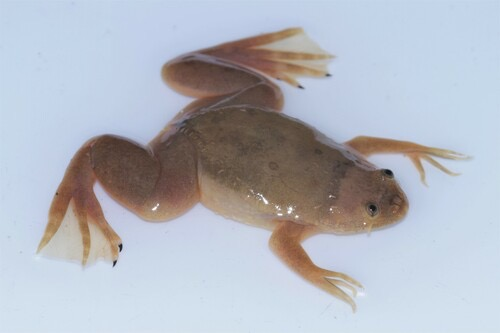

Conservation status
- Least Concern (IUCN 3.1)

Scientific classification
- Kingdom: Animalia
- Phylum: Chordata
- Class: Amphibia
- Order: Anura
- Family: Pipidae
- Genus: Xenopus
- Species: X. andrei

Binomial name
- Xenopus andrei Loumont, 1983

= Andre's clawed frog =

Species of amphibian

Andre's clawed frog (Xenopus andrei) is a species of frog in the family Pipidae. It is known, with certainty, only from coastal Cameroon (where its type locality, Longyi, near Kribi), northeastern Gabon, western Central African Republic and northwestern Angola. It presumably occurs in the intervening Republic of the Congo, Democratic Republic of the Congo, and Equatorial Guinea.

Its natural habitats are lowland forests, where it occurs almost exclusively in water, in small ponds, shady swamps and pools. It is harvested by some human inhabitants within its range for food.
