= Aphanocalyx hedinii =

Conservation status
- Critically Endangered (IUCN 2.3)

Scientific classification
- Kingdom: Plantae
- Clade: Tracheophytes
- Clade: Angiosperms
- Clade: Eudicots
- Clade: Rosids
- Order: Fabales
- Family: Fabaceae
- Genus: Aphanocalyx
- Species: A. hedinii

Binomial name
- Aphanocalyx hedinii (A.Chev.) Wieringa

Synonyms
- Monopetalanthus hedinii A.Chev.

Species of legume

Aphanocalyx hedinii is a species of plant in the family Fabaceae. It is found only in Cameroon. It is threatened by habitat loss.
