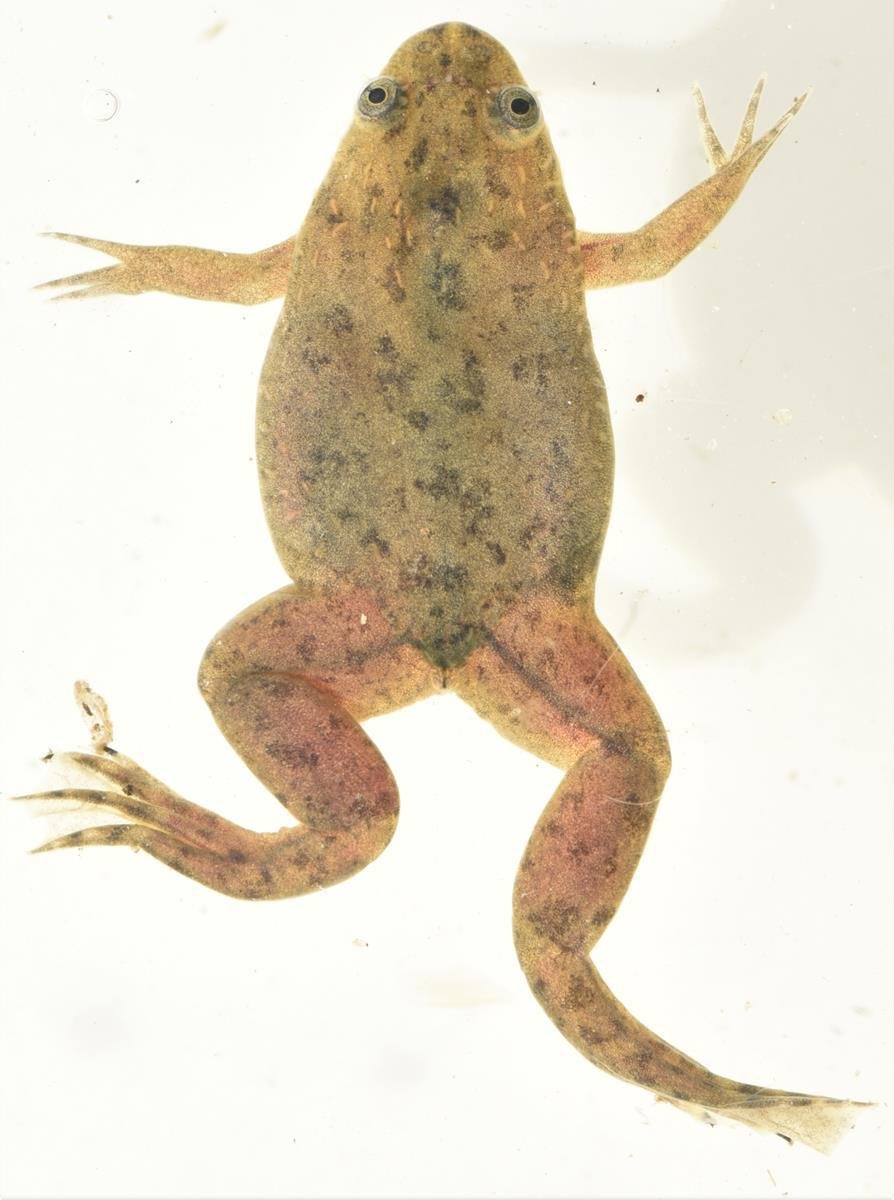

Conservation status
- Least Concern (IUCN 3.1)

Scientific classification
- Kingdom: Animalia
- Phylum: Chordata
- Class: Amphibia
- Order: Anura
- Family: Pipidae
- Genus: Xenopus
- Species: X. victorianus

Binomial name
- Xenopus victorianus Ahl, 1924

Synonyms
- Xenopus laevis victorianus – Loveridge, 1933; Xenopus laevis bunyoniensis Loveridge, 1932

= Xenopus victorianus =

Species of amphibian

Xenopus victorianus, the Lake Victoria clawed frog or Mwanza frog, is a species of frogs in the family Pipidae. It is found in aquatic habitats in eastern Democratic Republic of Congo and South Sudan, Uganda, Kenya, Rwanda, Burundi, and Tanzania. However, because of confusion with Xenopus laevis, the exact distribution is quite unclear.

Xenopus victorianus occurs in all sorts of aquatic habitats, except that it tends to avoid large rivers and waterbodies with predatory fish. It is most abundant in eutrophic water. It breeds in water, but apparently only in standing water. It is an opportunistic species that has high potential to colonize newly created bodies of water. It is a very abundant and adaptable species that is not facing major threats.
