= Aphanocalyx heitzii =

Conservation status
- Near Threatened (IUCN 2.3)

Scientific classification
- Kingdom: Plantae
- Clade: Tracheophytes
- Clade: Angiosperms
- Clade: Eudicots
- Clade: Rosids
- Order: Fabales
- Family: Fabaceae
- Genus: Aphanocalyx
- Species: A. heitzii

Binomial name
- Aphanocalyx heitzii (Pellegrin) Weiringa

Synonyms
- Monopetalanthus heitzii Pellegrin

Species of legume

Aphanocalyx heitzii is a species of plant in the family Fabaceae. It is found in Gabon and possibly Cameroon. It is threatened by habitat loss.
