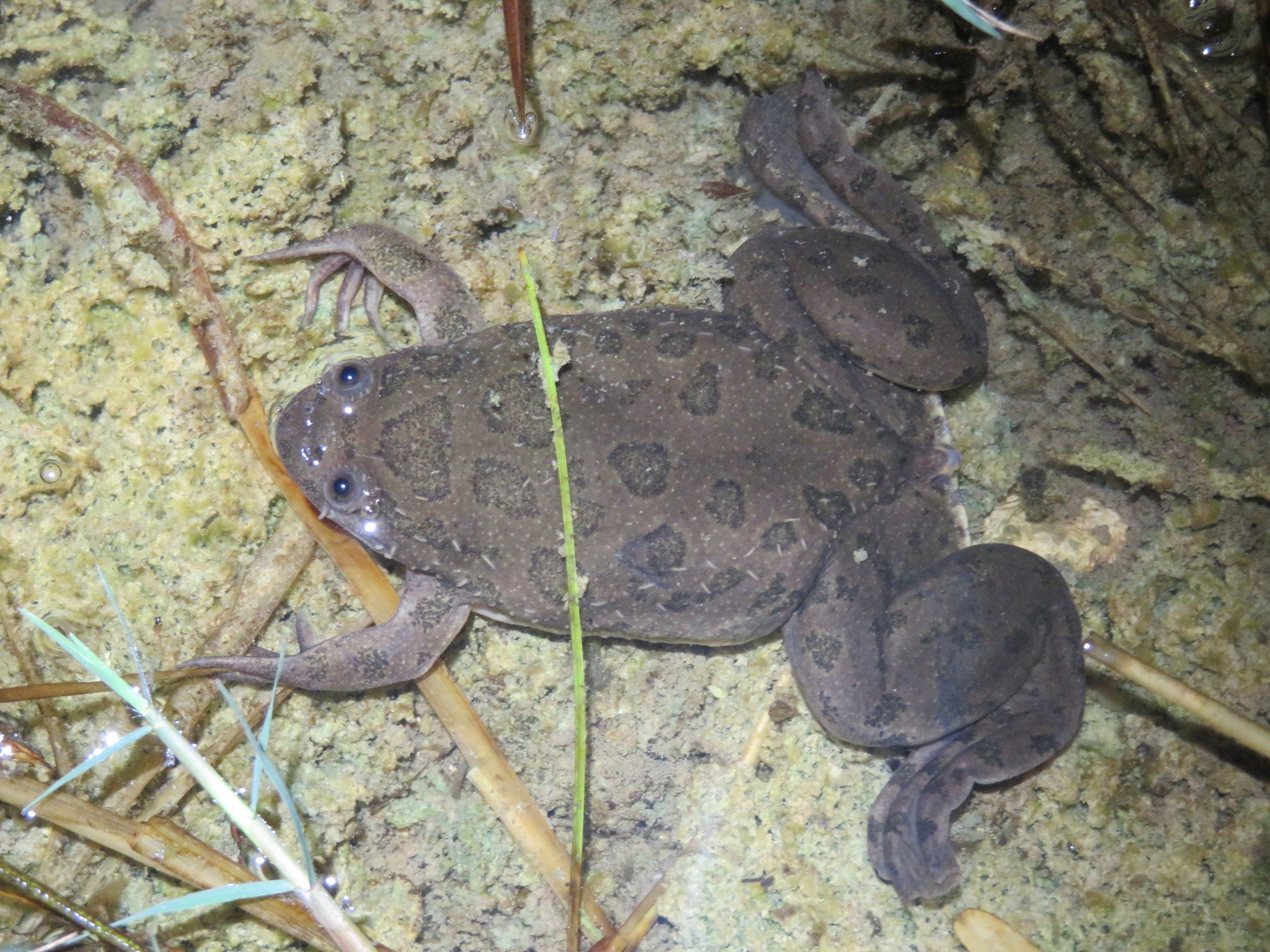

Conservation status
- Least Concern (IUCN 3.1)

Scientific classification
- Kingdom: Animalia
- Phylum: Chordata
- Class: Amphibia
- Order: Anura
- Family: Pipidae
- Genus: Xenopus
- Species: X. muelleri

Binomial name
- Xenopus muelleri (Peters, 1844)

Synonyms
- Dactylethra muelleri Peters, 1844

= Müller's platanna =

Species of frog

Müller's platanna (Xenopus muelleri), also known as Müller's clawed frog, is a species of frog in the family Pipidae found in Angola, Benin, Botswana, Burkina Faso, Cameroon, the Central African Republic, Chad, the Republic of the Congo, the Democratic Republic of the Congo, Ivory Coast, Eswatini, Ghana, Kenya, Malawi, Mozambique, Namibia, Nigeria, South Africa, Sudan, Tanzania, Togo, Uganda, Zambia, and Zimbabwe.

== Description ==
Müller's clawed frog can be distinguished from Xenopus laevis by a relatively longer subocular tentacle.

== Habitat ==
Its natural habitats are subtropical or tropical dry forests, subtropical or tropical moist lowland forests, dry savanna, moist savanna, subtropical or tropical dry shrubland, subtropical or tropical moist shrubland, subtropical or tropical dry lowland grassland, subtropical or tropical seasonally wet or flooded lowland grassland, subtropical or tropical high-altitude grassland, rivers, intermittent rivers, swamps, freshwater lakes, intermittent freshwater lakes, freshwater marshes, intermittent freshwater marshes, freshwater springs, arable land, pastureland, rural gardens, water storage areas, ponds, open excavations, and canals and ditches.

Where the distributions of X. laevis and X. muelleri overlap, X. muelleri prefers warmer areas at lower elevations.
