= Bouchia clawed frog =

Conservation status
- Least Concern (IUCN 3.1)

Scientific classification
- Kingdom: Animalia
- Phylum: Chordata
- Class: Amphibia
- Order: Anura
- Family: Pipidae
- Genus: Xenopus
- Species: X. pygmaeus

Binomial name
- Xenopus pygmaeus Loumont, 1986

Species of amphibian

The Bouchia clawed frog (Xenopus pygmaeus) is a species of frog in the family Pipidae found in the Central African Republic, the Democratic Republic of the Congo, Uganda, and possibly the Republic of the Congo. Its natural habitats are subtropical or tropical moist lowland forests, swamps, freshwater marshes, intermittent freshwater marshes, rural gardens, and heavily degraded former forests.
