= Xenopus itombwensis =

Conservation status
- Endangered (IUCN 3.1)

Scientific classification
- Kingdom: Animalia
- Phylum: Chordata
- Class: Amphibia
- Order: Anura
- Family: Pipidae
- Genus: Xenopus
- Species: X. itombwensis

Binomial name
- Xenopus itombwensis Evans, Carter, Tobias, Kelley, Hanner & Tinsley, 2008

Species of amphibian

Xenopus itombwensis is a species of frog in the family Pipidae endemic to the Itombwe Massif of the South Kivu Province of the Democratic Republic of the Congo.
