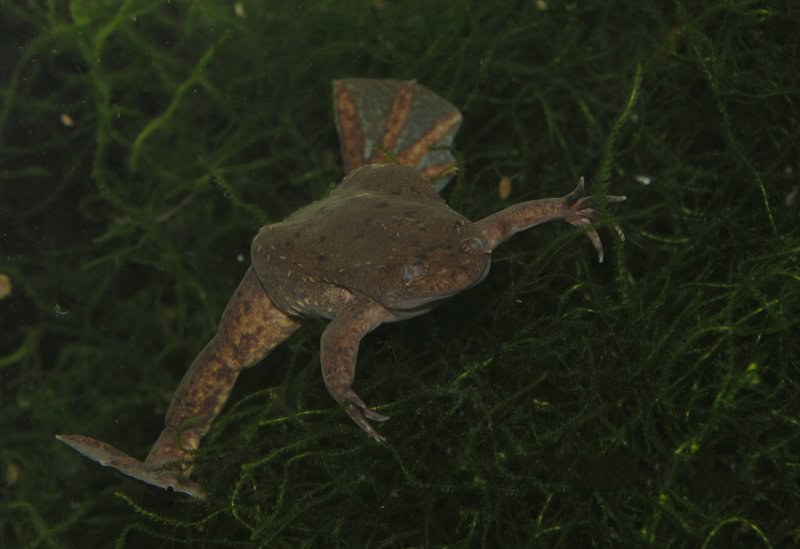

Conservation status
- Vulnerable (IUCN 3.1)

Scientific classification
- Kingdom: Animalia
- Phylum: Chordata
- Class: Amphibia
- Order: Anura
- Family: Pipidae
- Genus: Xenopus
- Species: X. amieti

Binomial name
- Xenopus amieti Kobel, du Pasquier, Fischberg & Gloor, 1980

= Volcano clawed frog =

Species of amphibian

The volcano clawed frog (Xenopus amieti) is a species of frog in the family Pipidae endemic to Cameroon. Its natural habitats are subtropical or tropical high-altitude grassland, swamps, intermittent freshwater lakes, freshwater marshes, pastureland, and aquaculture ponds. It is threatened by habitat loss.

The skin secretions of the volcano clawed (Xenopus amieti) octoploid frog contain non-toxic insulin-releasing peptides that could be developed into novel anti-diabetic drugs. These secretions are stimulated by injection of norepinephrine bitartrate.
