= Haploidisation =

Process of halving chromosomal content of a cell, producing a haploid cell

Haploidisation is the process of halving the chromosomal content of a cell, producing a haploid cell. Within the normal reproductive cycle, haploidisation is one of the major functional consequences of meiosis, the other being a process of chromosomal crossover that mingles the genetic content of the parental chromosomes. Usually, haploidisation creates a monoploid cell from a diploid progenitor, or it can involve halving of a polyploid cell, for example to make a diploid potato plant from a tetraploid lineage of potato plants.

If haploidisation is not followed by fertilisation, the result is a haploid lineage of cells. For example, experimental haploidisation may be used to recover a strain of haploid Dictyostelium from a diploid strain. It sometimes occurs naturally in plants when meiotically reduced cells (usually egg cells) develop by parthenogenesis.

Haploidisation was one of the procedures used by Japanese researchers to produce Kaguya, a mouse which had same-sex parents; two haploids were then combined to make the diploid mouse.

Haploidisation commitment is a checkpoint in meiosis which follows the successful completion of premeiotic DNA replication and recombination commitment.

== See also ==
- Polyploidy
- Ploidy
