= Aphanocalyx microphyllus subsp. compactus =

Conservation status
- Vulnerable (IUCN 2.3)

Scientific classification
- Kingdom: Plantae
- Clade: Tracheophytes
- Clade: Angiosperms
- Clade: Eudicots
- Clade: Rosids
- Order: Fabales
- Family: Fabaceae
- Genus: Aphanocalyx
- Species: A. microphyllus
- Subspecies: A. m. subsp. compactus

Trinomial name
- Aphanocalyx microphyllus subsp. compactus (Hutch. ex Lane-Poole) Wieringa

Synonyms
- Monopetalanthus compactus Hutch. ex Lane-Poole

Subspecies of legume

Aphanocalyx microphyllus subsp. compactus is a tropical rainforest tree in the family Fabaceae. This subspecies is endemic to the western Guinean lowland forests of Ivory Coast, Liberia, and Sierra Leone. The nominal subspecies Aphanocalyx microphyllus subsp. microphyllus occurs in the rainforests of central Africa.
