= Largen's clawed frog =

Conservation status
- Endangered (IUCN 3.1)

Scientific classification
- Kingdom: Animalia
- Phylum: Chordata
- Class: Amphibia
- Order: Anura
- Family: Pipidae
- Genus: Xenopus
- Species: X. largeni

Binomial name
- Xenopus largeni Tinsley, 1995

Species of amphibian

Largen's clawed frog or the Sidamo clawed frog (Xenopus largeni) is a species of frogs in the family Pipidae. Endemic to Ethiopia its natural habitats are subtropical or tropical moist montane forests, rivers, freshwater marshes, arable land, and rural gardens. It is classed as endangered due to the decline of its habitat in the Ethiopian Highlands.
