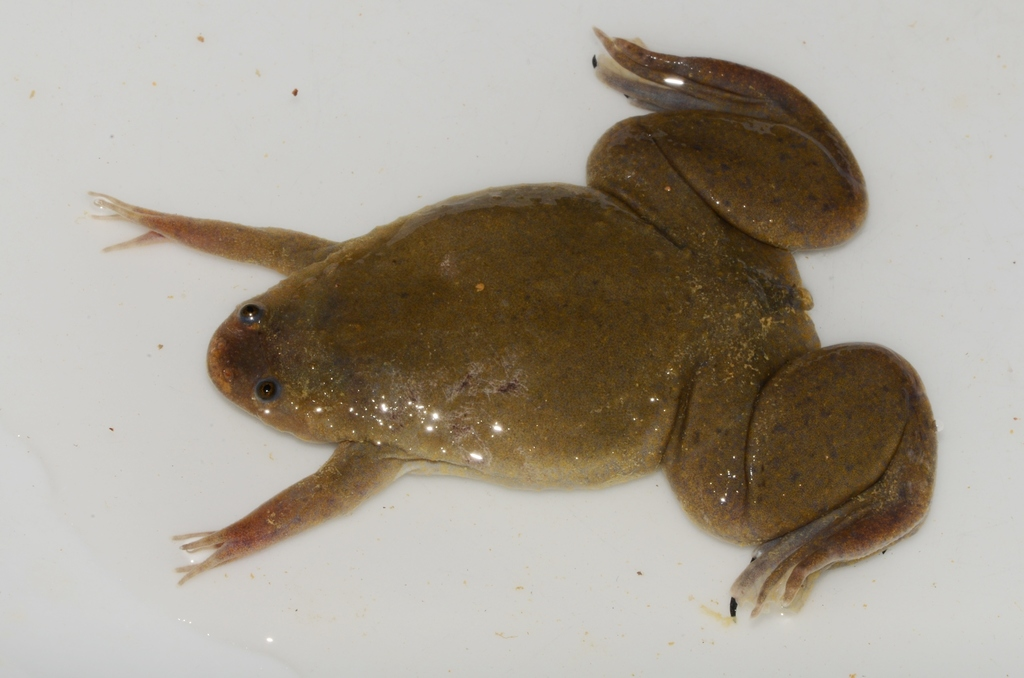

Conservation status
- Least Concern (IUCN 3.1)

Scientific classification
- Kingdom: Animalia
- Phylum: Chordata
- Class: Amphibia
- Order: Anura
- Family: Pipidae
- Genus: Xenopus
- Species: X. mellotropicalis

Binomial name
- Xenopus mellotropicalis Evans, Carter, Greenbaum, Gvozdík, Kelley, McLaughlin, Pauwels, Portik, Stanley et al., 2015

= Xenopus mellotropicalis =

Species of frog

Xenopus mellotropicalis, the Gabonese clawed frog is a species of frog from the genus Xenopus. It is listed as Least Concern on the IUCN Red List and populations are currently stable. It inhabits forests and wetlands in Central and West African countries which includes Gabon, Cameroon, Democratic Republic of Congo, and Congo. Its presence is unclear in countries such as Equatorial Guinea, Angola and Central African Republic. It has been recorded in elevations from 75 to 628 m (246 to 2,060 ft).
