= Pachycentrata =

Pachycentrata Temporal range: Coniacian–Santonian

Scientific classification
- Domain: Eukaryota
- Kingdom: Animalia
- Phylum: Chordata
- Class: Amphibia
- Order: Anura
- Family: Pipidae
- Subfamily: Pipinae
- Genus: †Pachycentrata; Báez and Rage, 2004
- Species: †P. taqueti

Binomial name
- †Pachycentrata taqueti (Báez and Rage, 1998)

Synonyms
- Pachybatrachus taqueti Báez and Rage, 1998 (gen preoccupied)

Extinct genus of frogs

Pachycentrata is an extinct genus of frogs.

Pachycentrata fossils have been found in the In Beceten Formation located in Tahoua, Niger. The fossils have been dated to the late/upper Coniacian to Santonian periods. It is estimated to have snout-vent length about 7 centimetres (2.8 in). The original phylogenetic analysis suggested that it was more closely related to Pipa than to Xenopus, and a recent phylogenetic supports this conclusion in an unconstrained phylogenetic analysis, but constraining for the topology obtained by molecular studies yields less resolved results that place Pachycentrata in an unresolved polytomy with extant pipids and several extinct pipimorphs.

== See also ==
- Prehistoric amphibian
- List of prehistoric amphibians
