= Xenopus poweri =

Conservation status
- Least Concern (IUCN 3.1)

Scientific classification
- Kingdom: Animalia
- Phylum: Chordata
- Class: Amphibia
- Order: Anura
- Family: Pipidae
- Genus: Xenopus
- Species: X. poweri

Binomial name
- Xenopus poweri Hewitt, 1927

Species of frog

Xenopus poweri is a species of clawed frog found in shrublands, wetlands, forests, savannas and grasslands of Central and Southern Africa. Countries in which they occur includes Namibia, Angola, Central African Republic, Zambia, Botswana, Democratic Republic of Congo, Zimbabwe, Cameroon and Congo.
