= Oumtkoutia =

Oumtkoutia Temporal range: Cenomanian

Scientific classification
- Kingdom: Animalia
- Phylum: Chordata
- Class: Amphibia
- Order: Anura
- Family: Pipidae
- Genus: †Oumtkoutia
- Species: †O. anae

Binomial name
- †Oumtkoutia anae Rage and Dutheil, 2008

Extinct genus of pipid frog

Oumtkoutia is an extinct monotypic genus of pipid frog that lived in North Africa during the Cenomanian stage of the Late Cretaceous epoch.

== Distribution ==
The type species of the genus, Oumtkoutia anae, hails from the Kem Kem Group of Morocco, specifically from fossil deposits dating to the Cenomanian stage.
