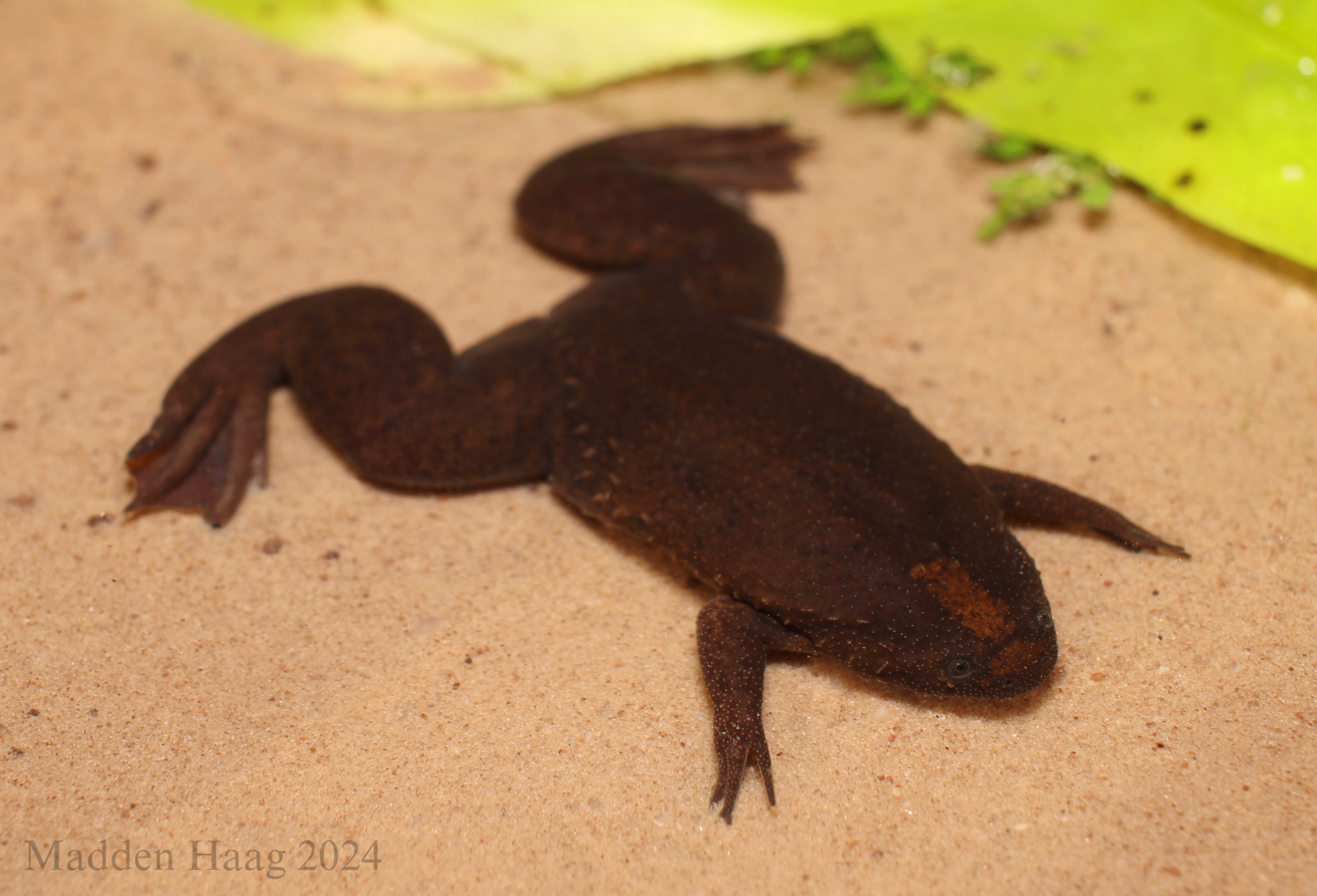

Conservation status
- Least Concern (IUCN 3.1)

Scientific classification
- Kingdom: Animalia
- Phylum: Chordata
- Class: Amphibia
- Order: Anura
- Family: Pipidae
- Genus: Xenopus
- Species: X. tropicalis

Binomial name
- Xenopus tropicalis (Gray, 1864)

Synonyms
- Silurana tropicalis Gray, 1864

= Western clawed frog =

Species of amphibian

The western clawed frog (Xenopus tropicalis) is a species of frog in the family Pipidae, also known as tropical clawed frog. It is the only species in the genus Xenopus to have a diploid genome. Its genome has been sequenced, making it a significant model organism for genetics that complements the related species Xenopus laevis (the African clawed frog), a widely used vertebrate model for developmental biology. X. tropicalis also has a number of advantages over X. laevis in research, such as a much shorter generation time (<5 months), smaller size (4–6 cm (1.6–2.4 in) body length), and a larger number of eggs per spawn.

It is found in Benin, Burkina Faso, Cameroon, Ivory Coast, Equatorial Guinea, Gambia, Ghana, Guinea, Guinea-Bissau, Liberia, Nigeria, Senegal, Sierra Leone, Togo, and possibly Mali. Its natural habitats are subtropical or tropical moist lowland forests, moist savanna, rivers, intermittent rivers, swamps, freshwater lakes, intermittent freshwater lakes, freshwater marshes, intermittent freshwater marshes, rural gardens, heavily degraded former forests, water storage areas, ponds, aquaculture ponds, and canals and ditches.

== Description ==
The western clawed frog is a medium-sized species with a somewhat flattened body and a snout-vent length of 28 to 55 mm (1.1 to 2.2 in), females being larger than males. The eyes are bulging and situated high on the head and there is a short tentacle just below each eye. A row of unpigmented dermal tubercles runs along the flank from just behind the eye, and are thought to represent a lateral line organ. The limbs are short and plump, and the fully webbed feet have horny claws. The skin is finely granular. The dorsal surface varies from pale to dark brown and has small grey and black spots. The ventral surface is dull white or yellowish with some dark mottling.

== Distribution and habitat ==
The western clawed frog is an aquatic species and is found in the West African rainforest belt with a range stretching from Senegal to Cameroon and eastern Zaire. It is generally considered a forest-dwelling species and inhabits slow-moving streams, but it is also found in pools and temporary ponds in the northern Guinea and Sudan savannas.

== Biology ==
In the dry season, this frog lives in shallow streams and hides under tree roots, under flat stones, or in holes in the riverbank. It feeds primarily on earthworms, insect larvae and tadpoles. When the rainy season starts it migrates across the forest floor at night to find temporary pools. Spawning may take place in large pools with much vegetation, but tadpoles are also sometimes found in muddy pools with no vegetation. Single eggs may be attached to plants or they may float. The tadpoles have broad mouths and no jaws, but have long tentacles on their upper lips. The ventral fins of their tails are broader than the dorsal ones. Their body colour is generally orange and the tail transparent but in darker locations the tail may be blackish. The tadpoles feed by filtering zooplankton from the water. In large water bodies, they may form dense swarms. Metamorphosis takes place when the tadpoles measure about 5 cm (2 in) in length.

== Sex determination ==
Sex determination in the vast majority of amphibians is controlled by homomorphic (morphologically indistinguishable) sex chromosomes. As a result of this difficulty in sex chromosome identification, only a relatively small proportion of anuran species that have been karyotyped have also had their sex chromosomes identified. Of the species in the genus Xenopus, all have homomorphic sex chromosomes. Additionally, the DM-W gene on the W chromosome in some Xenopus species is the only sex-determining gene that has been identified in amphibians. This DM-W gene was first identified in X. laevis, however it is not found in X. tropicalis. Experimentation involving sex-reversed individuals, gynogenesis, triploids, and conventional crosses, has determined that X. tropicalis has three sex chromosomes: Y, W, and Z. These three sex chromosomes produce three different male genotypes, YW, YZ, and ZZ (all are phenotypically identical) and two different female genotypes, ZW, and WW (all are phenotypically identical). As a result, offspring of X. tropicalis can have sex ratios that differ from the commonly known 1:1 usually found in species with only two different sex chromosomes. For example, offspring resulting from a ZW female and a YZ male will have a sex ratio of 1:3 females to males and offspring resulting from a WW female and a ZZ male will be all female. As a result of this sex determination system, both male and female X. tropicalis can be either heterogametic or homogametic which is extremely rare in nature. The exact genetic mechanism and the exact alleles underlying this system is not yet known. One possible explanation is that the W chromosome contains a female-determining allele that has function that is not found on the Z chromosome while the Y chromosome contains an allele that acts a negative regulator that is dominant over the female-determining allele on the W chromosome.

Although X. tropicalis does have these three sex chromosomes, the frequency of these three sex chromosomes is not evenly distributed among this species' populations throughout its natural range. The Y chromosome has been identified from two localities in Ghana and in a laboratory strain that originated in Nigeria and the Z chromosome has been confirmed to exist in individuals from western and eastern Ghana. Additionally, all three sex chromosomes have been found to exist together in X. tropicalis populations in Ghana and potentially elsewhere in its range as well. Additionally, having irregular sex ratios in offspring is generally thought to be disadvantageous so whether or not the existence of three sex chromosomes in X. tropicalis is evolutionarily stable or an indication that the species is going through a sex chromosome transition (turnover), is still a question. It seems likely that the emergence of the Y chromosome is the most recent event in the evolution of this species' sex chromosomes. It is possible that in the future extinction of the Z chromosome would make it so that the W chromosome transitions into a X chromosome making this species with sex determined by an XY system. It is also possible that if the Y chromosome were to go extinct, this species will have reverted to using an ancestral ZW system.

== Status ==
The IUCN lists the western clawed frog as "Least Concern" because it has a wide distribution and is an adaptable species living in a range of habitats, and the population trend seems to be steady.

== Use as a genetic model system ==
See also Xenopus#Model organism for biological research

Xenopus embryos and eggs are a popular model system for a wide range of biomedical research. This animal is widely used because of its powerful combination of experimental tractability and close evolutionary relationship with humans, at least compared to many model organisms.

Unlike its sister species X. laevis, X. tropicalis is diploid and has a short generation time, facilitating genetic studies. The complete genome of X. tropicalis has been sequenced. This species has n=10 chromosomes.

X. tropicalis has three transferrin genes, all of which are close orthologs of other vertebrates. They are relatively far from non-vertebrate chordates, and widely divergent from protostome orthologs.

== Online Model Organism Database ==
Xenbase is the Model Organism Database (MOD) for both Xenopus laevis and Xenopus tropicalis.
