= Uganda clawed frog =

Conservation status
- Data Deficient (IUCN 3.1)

Scientific classification
- Kingdom: Animalia
- Phylum: Chordata
- Class: Amphibia
- Order: Anura
- Family: Pipidae
- Genus: Xenopus
- Species: X. ruwenzoriensis

Binomial name
- Xenopus ruwenzoriensis Tymowska & Fischberg, 1973

Species of amphibian

The Uganda clawed frog (Xenopus ruwenzoriensis) is a species of frog in the family Pipidae found in Uganda and possibly the Democratic Republic of the Congo. Its natural habitats are subtropical or tropical moist lowland forest, freshwater marshes, intermittent freshwater marshes, rural gardens, and heavily degraded former forest. It is threatened by habitat loss.

It is also unusual in that it is polyploid, with 12 sets of chromosomes (dodecaploidy).
