= Aphanocalyx =

Scientific classification
- Kingdom: Plantae
- Clade: Tracheophytes
- Clade: Angiosperms
- Clade: Eudicots
- Clade: Rosids
- Order: Fabales
- Family: Fabaceae
- Subfamily: Detarioideae
- Tribe: Amherstieae
- Genus: Aphanocalyx; Oliv. (1870)

Synonyms
- Monopetalanthus Harms (1897)

Genus of legumes

Aphanocalyx is a genus of flowering plants in the family Fabaceae. It belongs to the subfamily Detarioideae. It includes 14 species native to tropical Africa, ranging from Sierra Leone to Côte d'Ivoire, and from Cameroon to Angola and Tanzania.

== Species ==
Aphanocalyx includes the following species:

- Aphanocalyx cynometroides Oliv.
- Aphanocalyx djumaensis (De Wild.) J.Léonard
- Aphanocalyx hedinii (A.Chev.) Wieringa
- Aphanocalyx heitzii (Pellegr.) Wieringa
- Aphanocalyx jenseniae (Gram) Wieringa
- Aphanocalyx ledermannii (Harms) Wieringa
- Aphanocalyx libellula Wieringa
- Aphanocalyx margininervatus J.Léonard
- Aphanocalyx microphyllus (Harms) Wieringa
  - subsp. compactus (Hutch. ex Lane-Poole) Wieringa
- Aphanocalyx obscurus Wieringa
- Aphanocalyx pectinatus (A.Chev.) Wieringa
- Aphanocalyx pteridophyllus (Harms) Wieringa
- Aphanocalyx richardsiae (J.Léonard) Wieringa
- Aphanocalyx trapnellii (J.Léonard) Wieringa
