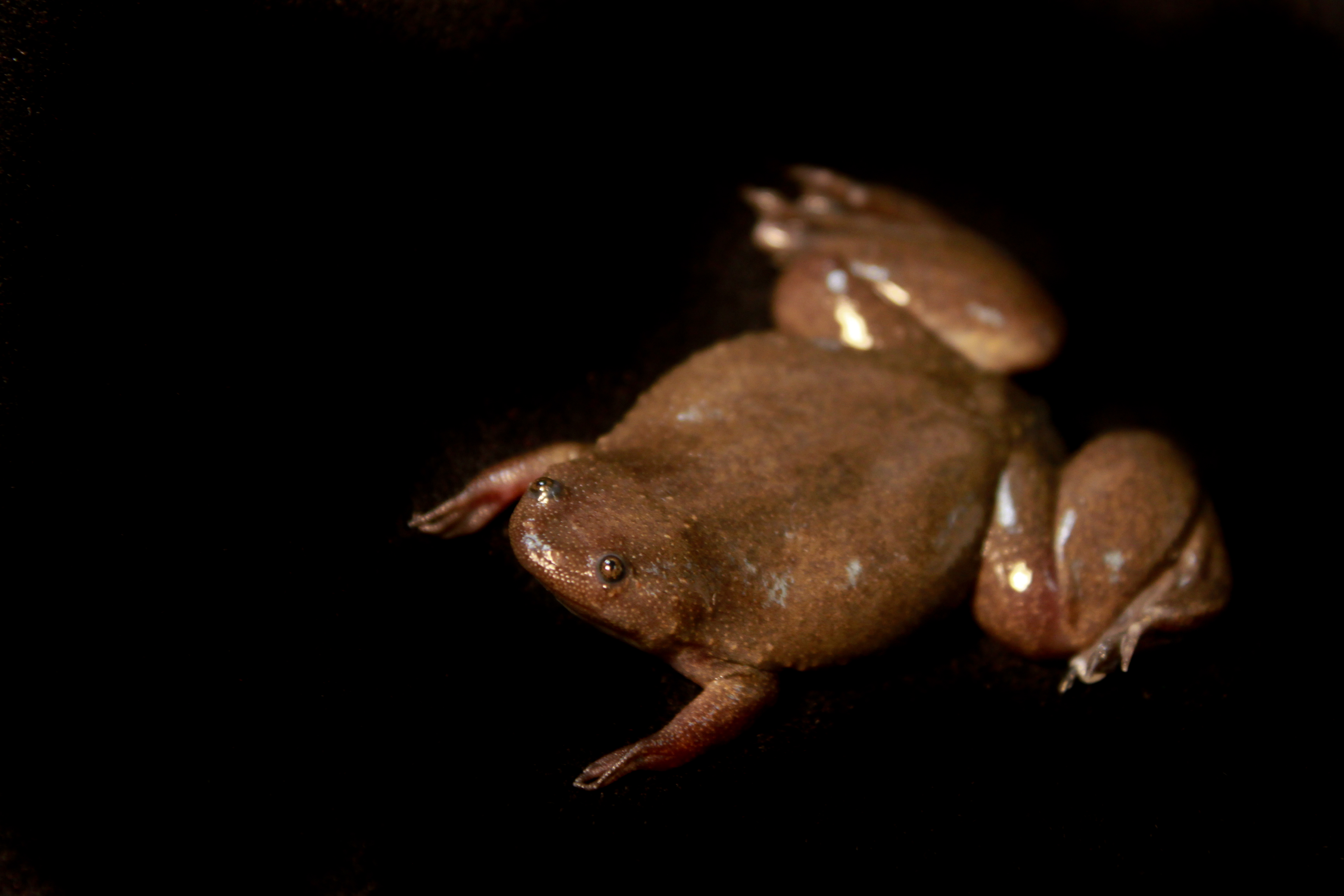

Conservation status
- Least Concern (IUCN 3.1)

Scientific classification
- Kingdom: Animalia
- Phylum: Chordata
- Class: Amphibia
- Order: Anura
- Family: Pipidae
- Genus: Xenopus
- Species: X. epitropicalis

Binomial name
- Xenopus epitropicalis Fischberg, Colombelli & Picard, 1982

Synonyms
- Silurana epitropicalis (Fischberg, Colombelli & Picard, 1982)

= Cameroon clawed frog =

Species of amphibian

The Cameroon clawed frog (Xenopus epitropicalis) is a species of frog in the family Pipidae found in Angola, Cameroon, the Central African Republic, the Republic of the Congo, the Democratic Republic of the Congo, Equatorial Guinea, Gabon, and possibly Sudan. Its natural habitats are subtropical or tropical moist lowland forests, freshwater marshes, intermittent freshwater marshes, heavily degraded former forest, and ponds. It is threatened by habitat loss.
