= De Witte's clawed frog =

Conservation status
- Least Concern (IUCN 3.1)

Scientific classification
- Kingdom: Animalia
- Phylum: Chordata
- Class: Amphibia
- Order: Anura
- Family: Pipidae
- Genus: Xenopus
- Species: X. wittei

Binomial name
- Xenopus wittei Tinsley, Kobel & Fischberg, 1979

Species of amphibian

De Witte's clawed frog (Xenopus wittei) is a species of frog in the family Pipidae found in the Democratic Republic of the Congo, Rwanda, Uganda, and possibly Burundi. Its natural habitats are subtropical or tropical moist montane forests, subtropical or tropical high-altitude grassland, rivers, swamps, freshwater lakes, intermittent freshwater lakes, freshwater marshes, intermittent freshwater marshes, arable land, pastureland, rural gardens, water storage areas, ponds, and canals and ditches.

It is named in honor of the Belgian herpetologist Gaston-François de Witte (1897–1980).
