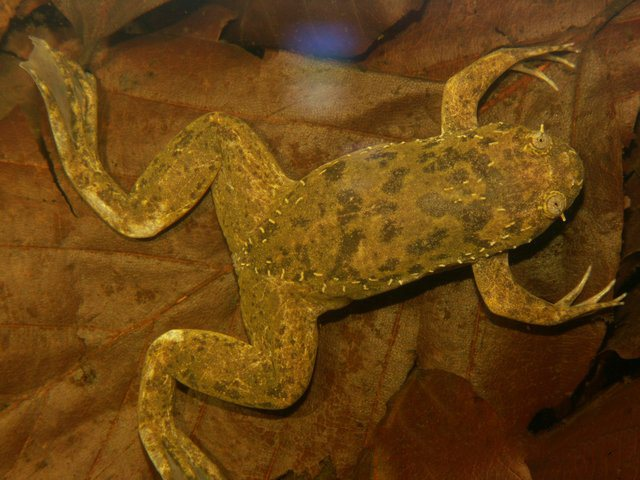

Conservation status
- Data Deficient (IUCN 3.1)

Scientific classification
- Kingdom: Animalia
- Phylum: Chordata
- Class: Amphibia
- Order: Anura
- Family: Pipidae
- Genus: Xenopus
- Species: X. fraseri

Binomial name
- Xenopus fraseri Boulenger, 1905

= Fraser's platanna =

Species of amphibian

Fraser's platanna (Xenopus fraseri) is a species of frogs in the family Pipidae found in Angola, Cameroon, Central African Republic, Republic of the Congo, Democratic Republic of the Congo, Equatorial Guinea, Gabon, and possibly Rwanda.

Its natural habitats are subtropical or tropical moist lowland forests, rivers, intermittent rivers, freshwater lakes, intermittent freshwater lakes, freshwater marshes, intermittent freshwater marshes, rural gardens, heavily degraded former forests, and ponds.
