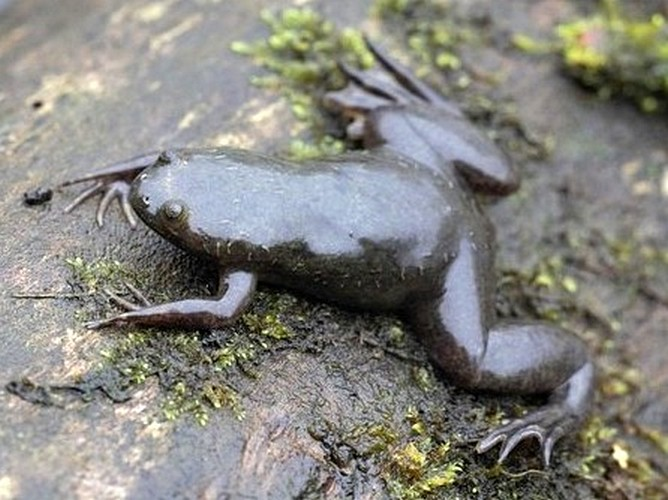

Conservation status
- Data Deficient (IUCN 3.1)

Scientific classification
- Kingdom: Animalia
- Phylum: Chordata
- Class: Amphibia
- Order: Anura
- Family: Pipidae
- Genus: Xenopus
- Species: X. calcaratus

Binomial name
- Xenopus calcaratus Peters, 1875

= Xenopus calcaratus =

Species of frog

Xenopus calcaratus, the Biafran clawed frog, is a species of frog from the genus Xenopus. It inhabits wetlands, forests and savannas in Equatorial Guinea and Cameroon. It can be found in elevations of 30 to 180 m (98 to 591 ft).
