= Merlin's dwarf gray frog =

Conservation status
- Least Concern (IUCN 3.1)

Scientific classification
- Kingdom: Animalia
- Phylum: Chordata
- Class: Amphibia
- Order: Anura
- Family: Pipidae
- Genus: Pseudhymenochirus; Chabanaud, 1920
- Species: P. merlini

Binomial name
- Pseudhymenochirus merlini Chabanaud, 1920

Synonyms
- Hymenochirus merlini (Chabanaud, 1920)

Species of amphibian

Merlin's dwarf gray frog (Pseudhymenochirus merlini), or Merlin's clawed frog, is a species of frog in the family Pipidae. It is monotypic within the genus Pseudhymenochirus. It is found in southern Guinea-Bissau, western Guinea, and southern Sierra Leone.

== Taxonomy and evolution ==
Genus Pseudhymenochirus has also been placed as a subgenus in Hymenochirus (African dwarf frogs), although it is geographically widely separated from that genus. At any rate, these two genera are probably sister groups.

In most species in the family Pipidae, sound production occurs without externally visible movements of the flanks or throat and is based on a different mechanism than in anurans in general. This is interpreted as an adaptation to their aquatic lifestyle. However, within pipids, Hymenochirus appears to be an exception, and sound production is based on moving air in a more conventional anuran manner. Nevertheless, molecular and morphological analyses show that sound production in Hymenochirus is an evolutionary novelty that represents a reversal to the ancestral condition of air-driven sound production.

== Habitat and conservation ==
Pseudhymenochirus merlini is a largely aquatic frog that lives in aquatic habitats with shade, e.g., still water in lowland forests and agricultural land, and in small, very slow-moving rocky streams. It avoids waterbodies with many fish. It can colonize newly created aquatic habitats by migrating overland.

Pseudhymenochirus merlini is common where it occurs. It is harvested for local food consumption, which is posing some threat to it. Also logging of shading trees and introduced predatory fish can locally have negative impacts, but overall this species in not threatened.
