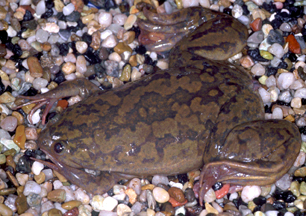
- Xenopus laevis

Scientific classification
- Kingdom: Animalia
- Phylum: Chordata
- Class: Amphibia
- Order: Anura
- Family: Pipidae
- Genus: Xenopus; Wagler 1827

Type species
- Xenopus boiei Daudin, 1802

Species
- See text

= Xenopus =

Xenopus Temporal range: Oligocene–Recent

Genus of amphibians

Xenopus (/ˈzɛnəpəs/) (from Greek ξενος, xenos 'strange' + πους, pous 'foot', commonly known as the clawed frog) is a genus of highly aquatic frogs native to sub-Saharan Africa. Twenty species are currently described within it. The two best-known species of this genus are Xenopus laevis and Xenopus tropicalis, which are commonly studied as model organisms for developmental biology, cell biology, toxicology, neuroscience and for modelling human disease and birth defects.

The genus is also known for its allopolyploidy, with some species having up to 12 sets of chromosomes (all except for X. tropicalis have undergone diploidization; the highest is 2n = 12x = 108).

== Characteristics ==
Xenopus laevis is a rather inactive creature. It is incredibly hearty and can live up to 15 years. At times the ponds that Xenopus laevis is found in dry up, compelling it, in the dry season, to burrow into the mud, leaving a tunnel for air. It may lie dormant for up to a year. If the pond dries up in the rainy season, Xenopus laevis may migrate long distances to another pond, maintaining hydration by the rains. It is an adept swimmer, swimming in all directions with ease. It is barely able to hop, but it is able to crawl. It spends most of its time underwater and comes to surface to breathe. Respiration is predominantly through its well-developed lungs; there is little cutaneous respiration.

=== Description ===
All species of Xenopus have flattened, somewhat egg-shaped and streamlined bodies, and very slippery skin (because of a protective mucus covering). The frog's skin is smooth, but with a lateral line sensory organ that has a stitch-like appearance. The frogs are all excellent swimmers and have powerful, fully webbed toes, though the fingers lack webbing. Three of the toes on each foot have conspicuous black claws.

The frog's eyes are on top of the head, looking upwards. The pupils are circular. They have no moveable eyelids, tongues (rather it is completely attached to the floor of the mouth) or eardrums (similarly to Pipa pipa, the common Suriname toad).

Unlike most amphibians, they have no haptoglobin in their blood.

=== Behaviour ===
Xenopus species are entirely aquatic, though they have been observed migrating on land to nearby bodies of water during times of drought or in heavy rain. They are usually found in lakes, rivers, swamps, potholes in streams, and man-made reservoirs.

Adult frogs are usually both predators and scavengers, and since their tongues are unusable, the frogs use their small fore limbs to aid in the feeding process. Since they also lack vocal sacs, they make clicks (brief pulses of sound) underwater (again similar to Pipa pipa). Males establish a hierarchy of social dominance in which primarily one male has the right to make the advertisement call. The females of many species produce a release call, and Xenopus laevis females produce an additional call when sexually receptive and soon to lay eggs. The Xenopus species are also active during the twilight (or crepuscular) hours.

During breeding season, the males develop ridge-like nuptial pads (black in color) on their fingers to aid in grasping the female. The frogs' mating embrace is inguinal, meaning the male grasps the female around her waist.

== Species ==
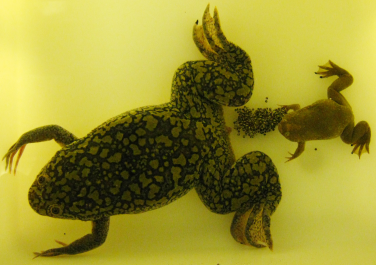
A Xenopus laevis female with a batch of freshly laid eggs and a Xenopus tropicalis male

=== Extant species ===
- Xenopus allofraseri
- Xenopus amieti (volcano clawed frog)
- Xenopus andrei (Andre's clawed frog)
- Xenopus borealis (Marsabit clawed frog)
- Xenopus boumbaensis (Mawa clawed frog)
- Xenopus calcaratus
- Xenopus clivii (Eritrea clawed frog)
- Xenopus epitropicalis (Cameroon clawed frog)
- Xenopus eysoole
- Xenopus fischbergi
- Xenopus fraseri (Fraser's platanna)
- Xenopus gilli (Cape platanna)
- Xenopus itombwensis
- Xenopus kobeli
- Xenopus laevis (African clawed frog or common platanna)
- Xenopus largeni (Largen's clawed frog)
- Xenopus lenduensis (Lendu Plateau clawed frog)
- Xenopus longipes (Lake Oku clawed frog)
- Xenopus mellotropicalis
- Xenopus muelleri (Müller's platanna)
- Xenopus parafraseri
- Xenopus petersii (Peters' platanna)
- Xenopus poweri
- Xenopus pygmaeus (Bouchia clawed frog)
- Xenopus ruwenzoriensis (Uganda clawed frog)
- Xenopus tropicalis (western clawed frog)
- Xenopus vestitus (Kivu clawed frog)
- Xenopus victorianus (Lake Victoria clawed frog)
- Xenopus wittei (De Witte's clawed frog)

=== Fossil species ===
The following fossil species have been described:

- †Xenopus arabiensis Henrici and Báez 2001 - Oligocene Yemen Volcanic Group, Yemen
- †Xenopus hasaunus Spinar 1980
- †Xenopus romeri Estes 1975 - Itaboraian Itaboraí Formation, Brazil
- †Xenopus stromeri Ahl 1926
- cf. Xenopus sp. - Campanian - Los Alamitos Formation, Argentina
- Xenopus (Xenopus) sp. - Late Oligocene Nsungwe Formation, Tanzania
- Xenopus sp. - Miocene Morocco
- Xenopus sp. - Early Pleistocene Olduvai Formation, Tanzania

There are also numerous "molecular fossil" species known today only as extinct parents of living allopolyploid species.

== Model organism for biological research ==
Like many other frogs, they are often used in laboratory as research subjects. Xenopus embryos and eggs are a popular model system for a wide variety of biological studies. This animal is used because of its powerful combination of experimental tractability and close evolutionary relationship with humans, at least compared to many model organisms.

Xenopus has long been an important tool for in vivo studies in molecular, cell, and developmental biology of vertebrate animals. However, the wide breadth of Xenopus research stems from the additional fact that cell-free extracts made from Xenopus are a premier in vitro system for studies of fundamental aspects of cell and molecular biology. Thus, Xenopus is a vertebrate model system that allows for high-throughput in vivo analyses of gene function and high-throughput biochemistry. Furthermore, Xenopus oocytes are a leading system for studies of ion transport and channel physiology. Xenopus is also a unique system for analyses of genome evolution (espcially allopolyploidization and diploidization) in vertebrates, as different Xenopus species form a allo-ploidy series (2x, 4x, 8x, 12x) formed by interspecific hybridization. (For an overview of Xenopus phylogeny taking into account past hybridization events, see Figure 3 of Evans et al., 2015.)

In 1931, Lancelot Hogben noted that Xenopus laevis females ovulated when injected with the urine of pregnant women. This led to a pregnancy test that was later refined by South African researchers Hillel Abbe Shapiro and Harry Zwarenstein. A female Xenopus frog injected with a woman's urine was put in a jar with a little water. If eggs were in the water a day later it meant the woman was pregnant. Four years after the first Xenopus test, Zwarenstein's colleague, Dr Louis Bosman, reported that the test was accurate in more than 99% of cases. From the 1930s to the 1950s, thousands of frogs were exported across the world for use in these pregnancy tests.

The National Xenopus Resource of the Marine Biological Laboratory is an in vivo repository for transgenic and mutant strains and a training center.

=== Online Model Organism Database ===
Xenbase is the Model Organism Database (MOD) for both Xenopus laevis and Xenopus tropicalis.

=== Investigation of human disease genes ===
All modes of Xenopus research (embryos, cell-free extracts, and oocytes) are commonly used in direct studies of human disease genes and to study the basic science underlying initiation and progression of cancer. Xenopus embryos for in vivo studies of human disease gene function: Xenopus embryos are large and easily manipulated, and moreover, thousands of embryos can be obtained in a single day. Indeed, Xenopus was the first vertebrate animal for which methods were developed to allow rapid analysis of gene function using misexpression (by mRNA injection). Injection of mRNA in Xenopus that led to the cloning of interferon. Moreover, the use of morpholino-antisense oligonucleotides for gene knockdowns in vertebrate embryos, which is now widely used, was first developed by Janet Heasman using Xenopus.

In recent years, these approaches have played in important role in studies of human disease genes. The mechanism of action for several genes mutated in human cystic kidney disorders (e.g. nephronophthisis) have been extensively studied in Xenopus embryos, shedding new light on the link between these disorders, ciliogenesis and Wnt signaling. Xenopus embryos have also provided a rapid test bed for validating newly discovered disease genes. For example, studies in Xenopus confirmed and elucidated the role of PYCR1 in cutis laxa with progeroid features.

Transgenic Xenopus for studying transcriptional regulation of human disease genes: Xenopus embryos develop rapidly, so transgenesis in Xenopus is a rapid and effective method for analyzing genomic regulatory sequences. In a recent study, mutations in the SMAD7 locus were revealed to associate with human colorectal cancer. The mutations lay in conserved, but noncoding sequences, suggesting these mutations impacted the patterns of SMAD7 transcription. To test this hypothesis, the authors used Xenopus transgenesis, and revealed this genomic region drove expression of GFP in the hindgut. Moreover, transgenics made with the mutant version of this region displayed substantially less expression in the hindgut.

Xenopus cell-free extracts for biochemical studies of proteins encoded by human disease genes: A unique advantage of the Xenopus system is that cytosolic extracts contain both soluble cytoplasmic and nuclear proteins (including chromatin proteins). This is in contrast to cellular extracts prepared from somatic cells with already distinct cellular compartments. Xenopus egg extracts have provided numerous insights into the basic biology of cells with particular impact on cell division and the DNA transactions associated with it (see below).

Studies in Xenopus egg extracts have also yielded critical insights into the mechanism of action of human disease genes associated with genetic instability and elevated cancer risk, such as ataxia telangiectasia, BRCA1 inherited breast and ovarian cancer, Nbs1 Nijmegen breakage syndrome, RecQL4 Rothmund-Thomson syndrome, c-Myc oncogene and FANC proteins (Fanconi anemia).

Xenopus oocytes for studies of gene expression and channel activity related to human disease: Yet another strength of Xenopus is the ability to rapidly and easily assay the activity of channel and transporter proteins using expression in oocytes. This application has also led to important insights into human disease, including studies related to trypanosome transmission, Epilepsy with ataxia and sensorineural deafness Catastrophic cardiac arrhythmia (Long-QT syndrome) and Megalencephalic leukoencephalopathy.

Gene editing by the CRISPR/CAS system has recently been demonstrated in Xenopus tropicalis and Xenopus laevis. This technique is being used to screen the effects of human disease genes in Xenopus and the system is sufficiently efficient to study the effects within the same embryos that have been manipulated.

=== Investigation of fundamental biological processes ===
Signal transduction: Xenopus embryos and cell-free extracts are widely used for basic research in signal transduction. In just the last few years, Xenopus embryos have provided crucial insights into the mechanisms of TGF-beta and Wnt signal transduction. For example, Xenopus embryos were used to identify the enzymes that control ubiquitination of Smad4, and to demonstrate direct links between TGF-beta superfamily signaling pathways and other important networks, such as the MAP kinase pathway and the Wnt pathway. Moreover, new methods using egg extracts revealed novel, important targets of the Wnt/GSK3 destruction complex.

Cell division: Xenopus egg extracts have allowed the study of many complicated cellular events in vitro. Because egg cytosol can support successive cycling between mitosis and interphase in vitro, it has been critical to diverse studies of cell division. For example, the small GTPase Ran was first found to regulate interphase nuclear transport, but Xenopus egg extracts revealed the critical role of Ran GTPase in mitosis independent of its role in interphase nuclear transport. Similarly, the cell-free extracts were used to model nuclear envelope assembly from chromatin, revealing the function of RanGTPase in regulating nuclear envelope reassembly after mitosis. More recently, using Xenopus egg extracts, it was possible to demonstrate the mitosis-specific function of the nuclear lamin B in regulating spindle morphogenesis and to identify new proteins that mediate kinetochore attachment to microtubules. Cell-free systems have recently become practical investigatory tools, and Xenopus oocytes are often the source of the extracts used. This has produced significant results in understanding mitotic oscillation and microtubules.

Embryonic development: Xenopus embryos are widely used in developmental biology. A summary of recent advances made by Xenopus research in recent years would include:

1. Epigenetics of cell fate specification and epigenome reference maps
2. microRNA in germ layer patterning and eye development
3. Link between Wnt signaling and telomerase
4. Development of the vasculature
5. Gut morphogenesis
6. Contact inhibition and neural crest cell migration and the generation of neural crest from pluripotent blastula cells
7. Developmental fate - Role of Notch: Dorsky et al. 1995 elucidated a pattern of expression followed by downregulation

DNA replication: Xenopus cell-free extracts also support the synchronous assembly and the activation of origins of DNA replication. They have been instrumental in characterizing the biochemical function of the prereplicative complex, including MCM proteins.

DNA damage response: Cell-free extracts have been instrumental to unravel the signaling pathways activated in response to DNA double-strand breaks (ATM), replication fork stalling (ATR) or DNA interstrand crosslinks (FA proteins and ATR). Notably, several mechanisms and components of these signal transduction pathways were first identified in Xenopus.

Apoptosis: Xenopus oocytes provide a tractable model for biochemical studies of apoptosis. Recently, oocytes were used recently to study the biochemical mechanisms of caspase-2 activation; importantly, this mechanism turns out to be conserved in mammals.

Regenerative medicine: In recent years, tremendous interest in developmental biology has been stoked by the promise of regenerative medicine. Xenopus has played a role here, as well. For example, expression of seven transcription factors in pluripotent Xenopus cells rendered those cells able to develop into functional eyes when implanted into Xenopus embryos, providing potential insights into the repair of retinal degeneration or damage. In a vastly different study, Xenopus embryos was used to study the effects of tissue tension on morphogenesis, an issue that will be critical for in vitro tissue engineering. Xenopus species are important model organisms for the study of spinal cord regeneration, because while capable of regeneration in their larval stages, Xenopus lose this capacity in early metamorphosis. Adult Xenopus can regrow part of their heart within 30 days after resection.

Physiology: The directional beating of multiciliated cells is essential to development and homeostasis in the central nervous system, the airway, and the oviduct. The multiciliated cells of the Xenopus epidermis have recently been developed as the first in vivo test-bed for live-cell studies of such ciliated tissues, and these studies have provided important insights into the biomechanical and molecular control of directional beating.

Actin: Another result from cell-free Xenopus oocyte extracts has been improved understanding of actin.

=== Small molecule screens to develop novel therapies ===
Because huge amounts of material are easily obtained, all modalities of Xenopus research are now being used for small-molecule based screens.

Chemical genetics of vascular growth in Xenopus tadpoles: Given the important role of neovascularization in cancer progression, Xenopus embryos were recently used to identify new small molecules inhibitors of blood vessel growth. Notably, compounds identified in Xenopus were effective in mice. Notably, frog embryos figured prominently in a study that used evolutionary principles to identify a novel vascular disrupting agent that may have chemotherapeutic potential. That work was featured in the New York Times Science Times

In vivo testing of potential endocrine disruptors in transgenic Xenopus embryos; A high-throughput assay for thyroid disruption has recently been developed using transgenic Xenopus embryos.

Small molecule screens in Xenopus egg extracts: Egg extracts provide ready analysis of molecular biological processes and can rapidly screened. This approach was used to identify novel inhibitors of proteasome-mediated protein degradation and DNA repair enzymes.

=== Genetic studies ===
While Xenopus laevis is the most commonly used species for developmental biology studies, genetic studies, especially forward genetic studies, can be complicated by their pseudotetraploid genome. Xenopus tropicalis provides a simpler model for genetic studies, being the only known member of the genus with a diploid genome.

=== Gene expression knockdown techniques ===
The expression of genes can be reduced by a variety of means, for example by using antisense oligonucleotides targeting specific mRNA molecules. DNA oligonucleotides complementary to specific mRNA molecules are often chemically modified to improve their stability in vivo. The chemical modifications used for this purpose include phosphorothioate, 2'-O-methyl, morpholino, MEA phosphoramidate and DEED phosphoramidate.

==== Morpholino oligonucleotides ====
Morpholino oligos are used in both X. laevis and X. tropicalis to probe the function of a protein by observing the results of eliminating the protein's activity. For example, a set of X. tropicalis genes has been screened in this fashion.

Morpholino oligos (MOs) are short, antisense oligos made of modified nucleotides. MOs can knock down gene expression by inhibiting mRNA translation, blocking RNA splicing, or inhibiting miRNA activity and maturation. MOs have proven to be effective knockdown tools in developmental biology experiments and RNA-blocking reagents for cells in culture. MOs do not degrade their RNA targets, but instead act via a steric blocking mechanism RNAseH-independent manner. They remain stable in cells and do not induce immune responses. Microinjection of MOs in early Xenopus embryos can suppress gene expression in a targeted manner.

Like all antisense approaches, different MOs can have different efficacy, and may cause off-target, non-specific effects. Often, several MOs need to be tested to find an effective target sequence. Rigorous controls are used to demonstrate specificity, including:

- Phenocopy of genetic mutation
- Verification of reduced protein by western or immunostaining
- mRNA rescue by adding back a mRNA immune to the MO
- use of 2 different MOs (translation blocking and splice blocking)
- injection of control MOs

Xenbase provides a searchable catalog of over 2000 MOs that have been specifically used in Xenopus research. The data is searchable via sequence, gene symbol and various synonyms (as used in different publications). Xenbase maps the MOs to the latest Xenopus genomes in GBrowse, predicts 'off-target' hits, and lists all Xenopus literature in which the morpholino has been published.
