= Eli Greenbaum =

American herpetologist (born 1974)

Eli Bowen Greenbaum
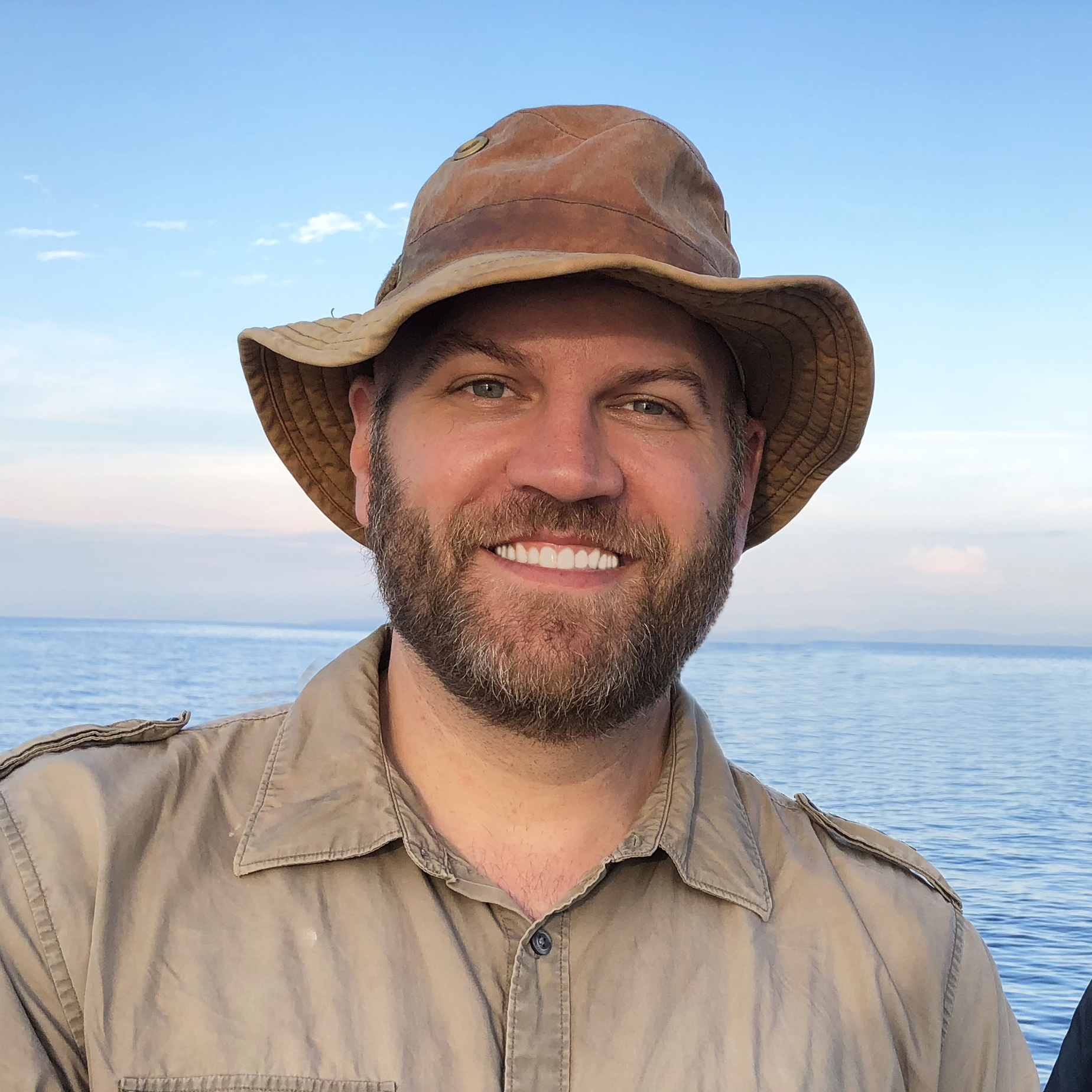
- Eli Greenbaum in 2018
- Education: Binghamton University; University of Louisiana at Monroe; University of Kansas
- Known for: Research on the herpetofauna of Central Africa, especially the Democratic Republic of the Congo
- Scientific career
- Fields: Herpetology, Evolutionary biology
- Workplaces: University of Texas at El Paso
- Doctoral advisor: Linda Trueb

Eli Bowen Greenbaum is an American herpetologist and evolutionary biologist. His research focuses on the herpetofauna of Central Africa, particularly that of the Democratic Republic of the Congo.

== Biography ==
After completing high school in 1992, Greenbaum earned a Bachelor of Science degree in 1996 from Binghamton University in Binghamton, New York. In 1998, he completed a Master of Science degree at the University of Louisiana at Monroe with a thesis on sex determination in the spiny softshell turtle (Apalone spinifera).

In 2006, Greenbaum received his PhD in ecology and evolutionary biology from the University of Kansas in Lawrence, Kansas. His doctoral dissertation, "Molecular systematics of New World microhyline frogs, with an emphasis on the Middle American genus Hypopachus", was completed under the supervision of Linda Trueb.

From 2006 to 2008, he worked as a research associate in the Department of Biology at Villanova University. He then joined the University of Texas at El Paso (UTEP), serving as assistant professor from 2008 to 2012 and as associate professor from 2013 onward in the Department of Biological Sciences.

== Research ==
During his graduate studies, Greenbaum focused primarily on New World microhylid frogs. Beginning in 2007, he shifted his research emphasis to the amphibians and reptiles of the Democratic Republic of the Congo, where he conducted nearly a decade of fieldwork.

His nine years of research in the Congo culminated in the book Emerald Labyrinth: A Scientist’s Adventures in the Jungles of the Congo, published in 2017. The book was selected by Forbes as one of the ten best biology books of 2017.

A substantial portion of Greenbaum’s work in the Congo involved collecting DNA samples from frogs and other amphibians and reptiles that may be at risk of extinction. His research combines specimen collection, DNA sequencing, and high-resolution photographic documentation.

In addition to his work in Central Africa, Greenbaum has conducted field research in Australia (1998), El Salvador (2000), Mali (2001), Guinea (2002), Mexico (2005), the Seychelles (2006), South Africa (2006), Peru (2008), Burundi (2011), Indonesia (2013), Uganda (2014), and in Louisiana during the late 1990s.

Greenbaum has authored more than 100 scientific publications, appearing in journals such as PLOS ONE, Zoological Journal of the Linnean Society, Molecular Phylogenetics and Evolution, Biology Letters, BMC Evolutionary Biology, Zootaxa, Herpetological Review, Breviora, Herpetological Monographs, and the Journal of Biogeography.

== Rediscovery of Arthroleptis hematogaster ==
In 2023, Greenbaum rediscovered the frog Arthroleptis hematogaster in the Democratic Republic of the Congo, a species that had not been documented since the 1950s.

== Selected works ==
- Köhler, G.; Veselý, M.; Greenbaum, E. (2006). The Amphibians and Reptiles of El Salvador.
- Emerald Labyrinth: A Scientist’s Adventures in the Jungles of the Congo (2017).
- Greenbaum, Eli (2025). Venomous River: Changing Climate, Imperiled Forests, and a Scientist's Race to Find New Species in the Congo, University of New Mexico Press, ISBN 978-0-8263-6824-9
