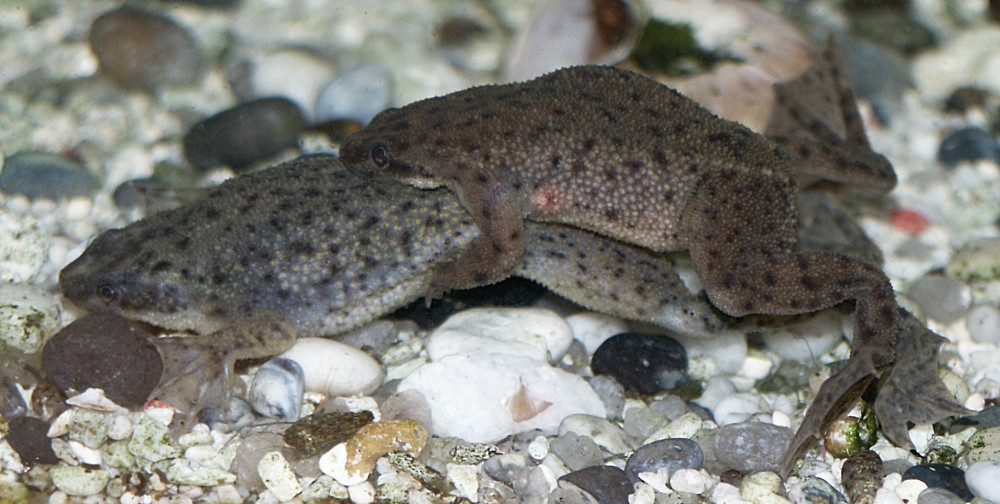
- African dwarf frog

Scientific classification
- Kingdom: Animalia
- Phylum: Chordata
- Class: Amphibia
- Order: Anura
- Clade: Pipoidea
- Clade: Pipimorpha
- Family: Pipidae; Gray 1825
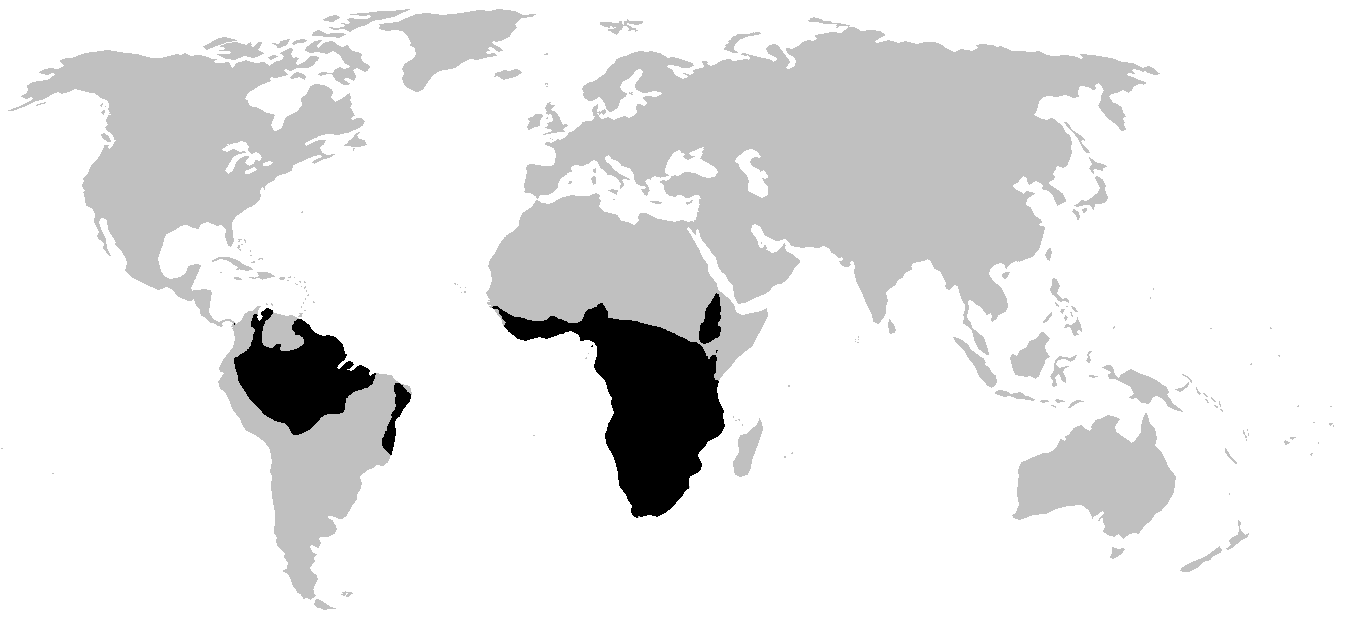
- Distribution of Pipidae in black

= Pipidae =

Pipidae Temporal range: Cenomanian–Recent

Family of amphibians

The Pipidae are a family of basal, tongueless frogs. There are 41 species in the family, found in tropical South America (genus Pipa) and sub-Saharan Africa (the three other genera).

== Description ==
Pipid frogs are highly aquatic and have numerous morphological modifications befitting their habitat. For example, the feet are completely webbed, the body is flattened, and a lateral line system is present in adults. In addition, pipids possess highly modified ears for producing and receiving sound under water. They lack a tongue or vocal cords, instead having bony rods in the larynx that help produce sound. They range from 4 to 19 cm (1.6 to 7.5 in) in body length.

== Taxonomy ==
Morphological data suggest that Xenopus is the sister-group of all other pipids, whereas molecular data consistently suggest that Pipa is the sister-group of other pipids.

Family Pipidae Gray 1825

- Hymenochirus Boulenger 1896 - dwarf clawed frogs (4 species)
- Pipa Laurenti 1768 - Surinam toads (7 species)
- Pseudhymenochirus Chabanaud 1920 - Merlin's dwarf gray frog or Merlin's clawed frog (1 species)
- Xenopus Wagler 1827 - clawed frogs (29 species)
  - Subgenus (Silurana) Wagler 1827 - common clawed frogs
  - Subgenus (Xenopus) Gray 1864 - tropical clawed frogs

=== Fossil record ===
The oldest fossil records of frogs more closely related to pipid frogs than to other extant frog families (Pipimorpha) extends into the Early Cretaceous. The oldest known crown group pipids are Oumtkoutia and Pachycentrata from the Upper Cretaceous of Morocco and Niger, respectively.

Included taxa after A. M. Aranciaga Rolando et al. 2019

- †Oumtkoutia (Rage and Dutheil 2008) Aoufous Formation, Morocco, Late Cretaceous (Cenomanian)
- †Llankibatrachus (Báez and Pugener 2003) Huitrera Formation, Argentina, Eocene
- †Pachycentrata (Báez and Rage 2004) (= Pachybatrachus Báez and Rage, 1998) In Beceten Formation, Niger, Late Cretaceous (Coniacian)
- †"Shelania" laurenti (Baez and Pugener 1998) Argentina, Eocene
- "Xenopus" romeri (Estes 1975) Companhia National de Cimento Portland Quarry, Brazil, Paleocene
- †Eoxenopoides (Haughton 1931) South Africa, Late Cretaceous (Maastrichtian)
- †Singidella (Báez and Harrison 2005) Tanzania, Eocene
- †Saltenia (Reih 1959) Las Curtiembres Formation, Argentina, Late Cretaceous (Campanian)

However, a more recent analysis suggests that some of these taxa are only close relatives of Pipidae, but outside the crown-group. Furthermore, the composition of this crown clade (in terms of which extinct taxa are included) depends on whether or not the topology is constrained to reflect the molecular tree.
