= Tadpole =

Larval stage in the life cycle of an amphibian

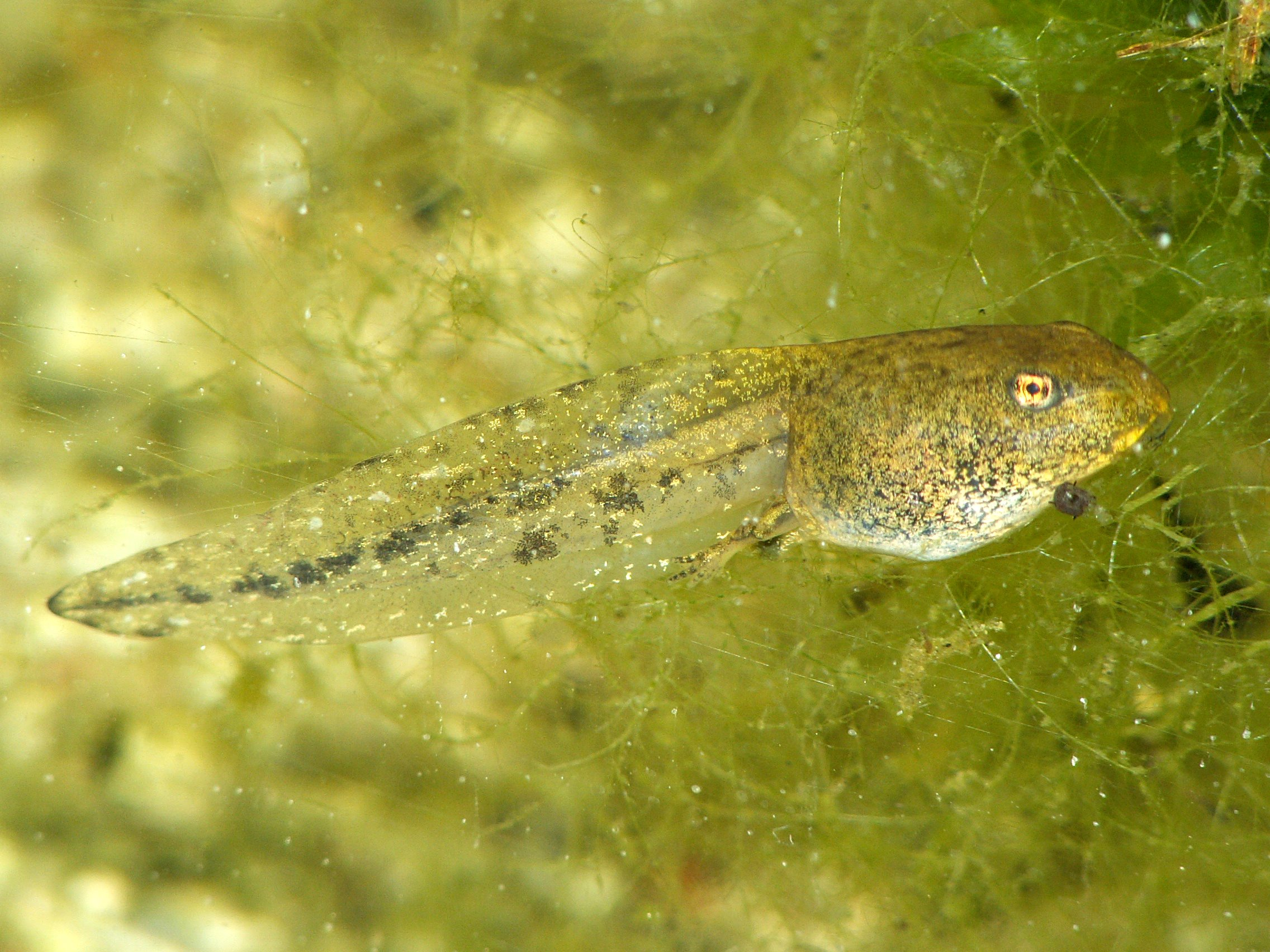
Common frog (Rana temporaria) tadpole

A tadpole or polliwog (also porwigle) is the larval stage in the biological life cycle of an amphibian. Most tadpoles are fully aquatic, though some species of amphibians have tadpoles that are terrestrial. Tadpoles have some fish-like features that may not be found in adult amphibians, such as a lateral line, gills and swimming tails. As they undergo metamorphosis, they start to develop functional lungs for breathing air, and the diet of tadpoles changes drastically.

A few amphibians, such as some members of the frog family Brevicipitidae, undergo direct development – i.e., they do not undergo a free-living larval stage as tadpoles – instead emerging from eggs as fully formed "froglet" miniatures of the adult morphology. Some other species hatch into tadpoles underneath the skin of the female adult or are kept in a pouch until after metamorphosis. Having no hard skeletons, it might be expected that tadpole fossils would not exist. However, traces of biofilms have been preserved and fossil tadpoles have been found dating back to the Middle Jurassic.

Tadpoles are eaten as human food in some parts of the world and are mentioned in various folk tales from around the world.

== Etymology ==
The name tadpole is from Middle English taddepol, made up of the elements tadde, 'toad', and pol, 'head' (modern English poll). Similarly, polliwog and porwigle (along with other spelling variants) are from Middle English polwygle, made up of the same pol, 'head', and wiglen, 'to wiggle'.

Tadpoles swimming in a pond in Japan, 2023

== General description ==
The life cycle of all amphibians involves a larval stage that is intermediate between embryo and adult. In most cases this larval stage is a limbless free-living organism that has a tail and is referred to as a tadpole, although in a few cases (e.g., in the Breviceps and Probreviceps genera of frogs) direct development occurs in which the larval stage is confined within the egg. Tadpoles of frogs are mostly herbivorous, while tadpoles of salamanders and caecilians are carnivorous.

=== Anura ===
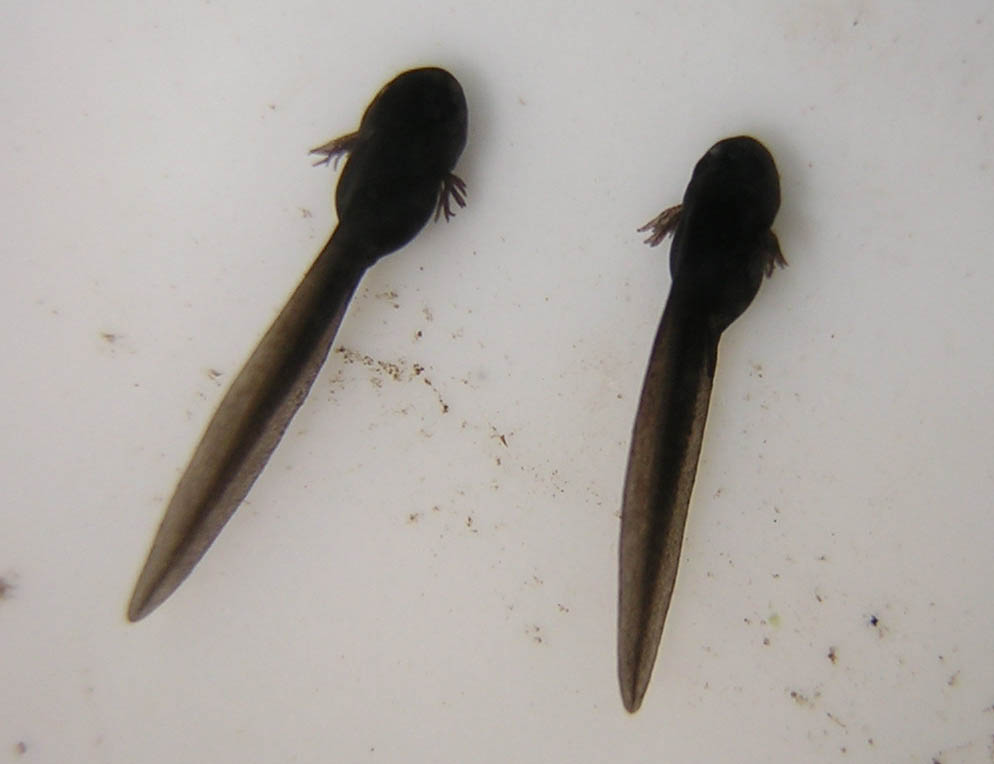
Ten-day-old tadpoles. The external gills will eventually be hidden by a layer of skin.

Tadpoles of frogs and toads are usually globular, with a laterally compressed tail with which they swim by lateral undulation. Lateral oscillations at the snout, hypothesised to be achieved by bending their vertebral column, creates a suction effect that helps generating thrust. When first hatched, anuran tadpoles have external gills that are eventually covered by skin, forming an opercular chamber with internal gills vented by spiracles. Depending on the species, there can be two spiracles on both sides of the body, a single spiracle on the underside near the vent, or a single spiracle on the left side of the body. Newly hatched tadpoles are also equipped with a cement gland which allows them to attach to objects. The tadpoles have a cartilaginous skeleton and a notochord which eventually develops into a proper spinal cord.

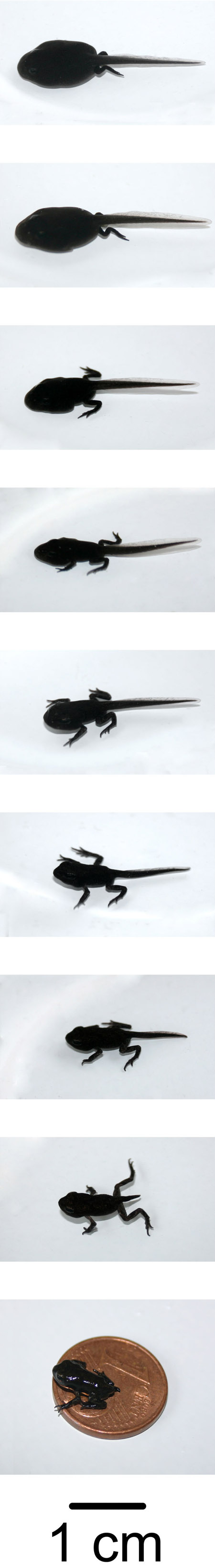
Metamorphosis of Bufo bufo

Anuran tadpoles are usually herbivorous, feeding on soft decaying plant matter. The gut of most tadpoles is long and spiral-shaped to efficiently digest organic matter and can be seen through the bellies of many species. Though many tadpoles will feed on dead animals if available to them, only a few species of frog have strictly carnivorous tadpoles, an example being the frogs of the family Ceratophryidae, their cannibalistic tadpoles having wide gaping mouths with which they devour other organisms, including other tadpoles. Another example is the tadpoles of the New Mexico spadefoot toad (Spea multiplicata) which will develop a carnivorous diet along with a broader head, larger jaw muscles, and a shorter gut if food is scarce, allowing them to consume fairy shrimp and their smaller herbivorous siblings. A few genera such as Pipidae and Microhylidae have species whose tadpoles are filter feeders that swim through the water column feeding on plankton. Megophrys tadpoles feed at the water surface using unusual funnel-shaped mouths.

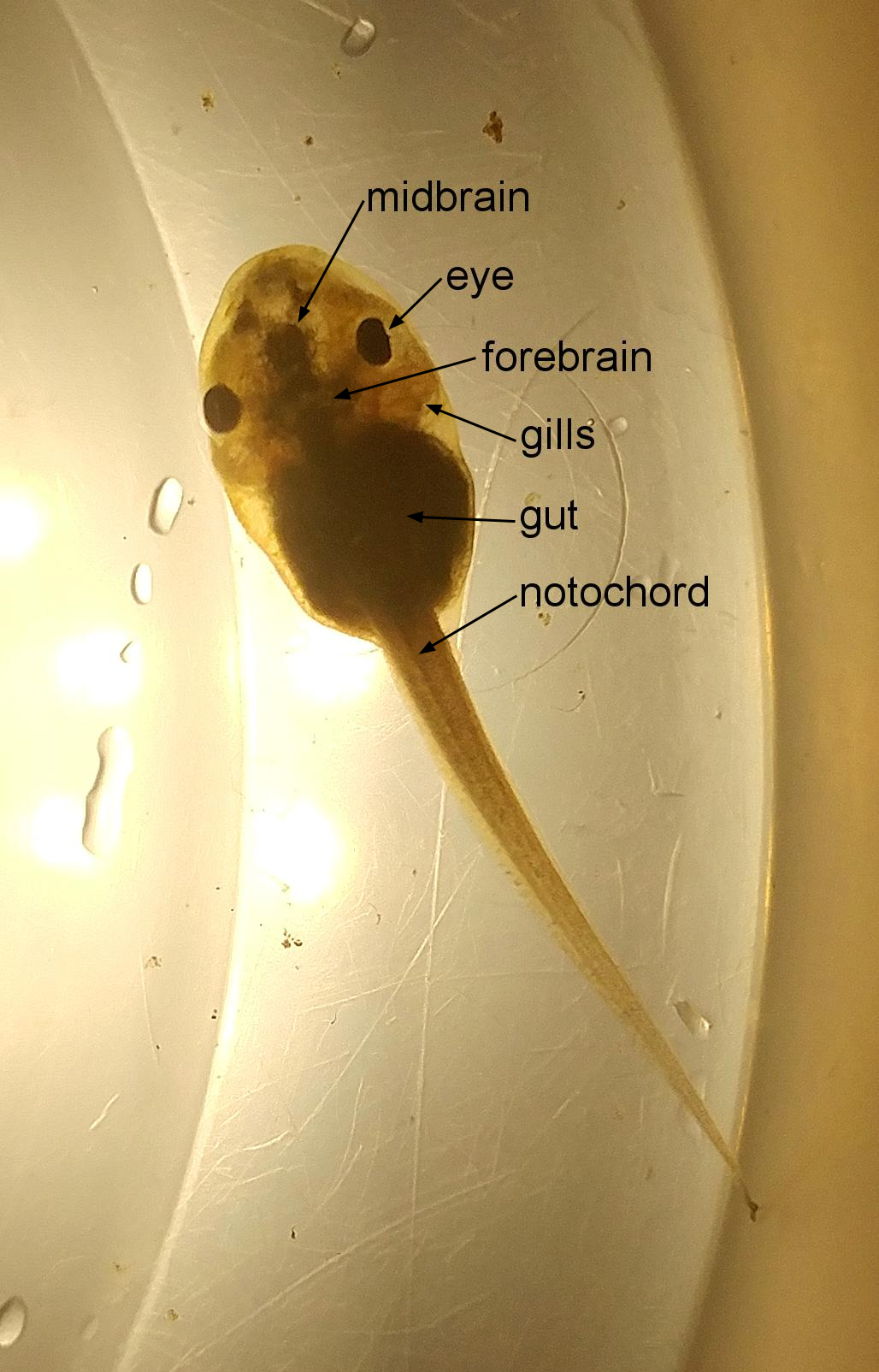
Anatomy of a wood frog tadpole (Lithobates sylvaticus)

As a frog tadpole matures it gradually develops its limbs, with the back legs growing first and the front legs second. The tail is absorbed into the body using apoptosis. Lungs develop around the time as the legs start growing, and tadpoles at this stage will often swim to the surface and gulp air. During the final stages of metamorphosis, the tadpole's mouth changes from a small, enclosed mouth at the front of the head to a large mouth the same width as the head. The intestines shorten as they transition from a herbivorous diet to the carnivorous diet of adult frogs.

Tadpoles vary greatly in size, both during their development and between species. For example, in a single family, Megophryidae, length of late-stage tadpoles varies between 3.3 centimetres (1.3 in) and 10.6 centimetres (4.2 in). The tadpoles of the paradoxical frog (Pseudis paradoxa) can reach up to 27 centimetres (11 in), the longest of any frog, before shrinking to a mere snout-to-vent length of 3.4–7.6 cm (1.3–3.0 in).

While most anuran tadpoles inhabit wetlands, ponds, vernal pools, and other small bodies of water with slow moving water, a few species are adapted to different environments. Some frogs have terrestrial tadpoles, such as the family Ranixalidae, whose tadpoles are found in wet crevices near streams. The tadpoles of Micrixalus herrei are adapted to a fossorial lifestyle, with a muscular body and tail, eyes covered by a layer of skin, and reduced pigment. Several frogs have stream dwelling tadpoles equipped with a strong oral sucker that allows them to hold onto rocks in fast flowing water, two examples being the Indian purple frog (Nasikabatrachus sahyadrensis) and the tailed frogs (Ascaphus) of Western North America. Although there are no marine tadpoles, the tadpoles of the crab-eating frog can cope with brackish water.

Some anurans will provide parental care towards their tadpoles. Frogs of the genus Afrixalus will lay their eggs on leaves above water, folding the leaves around the eggs for protection. Female Pipa frogs will embed the eggs into their backs where they get covered by a thin layer of skin. The eggs will hatch underneath her skin and grow, eventually leaving as either large tadpoles (such as in Pipa parva) or as fully formed froglets (Pipa pipa). Female marsupial frogs (Hemiphractidae) will carry eggs on her back for various amounts of time, with it going as far as letting the tadpoles develop into tiny froglets in a pouch. Male African bullfrogs (Pyxicephalus adspersus) will keep watch over their tadpoles, attacking anything that might be a potential threat, even though he may eat some of the tadpoles himself.

Males of the Emei mustache toads (Leptobrachium boringii) will construct nests along riverbanks where they breed with females and keep watch over the eggs, losing as much as 7.3% of their body mass in the time they spend protecting the nest. Male midwife toads (Alytes) will carry eggs between their legs to protect them from predators, eventually releasing them into a body of water when they are ready to hatch. Poison dart frogs (Dendrobatidae) will carry their tadpoles to various locations, usually phytotelma, where they remain until metamorphosis. Some female dart frogs such as the strawberry poison dart frog (Oophaga pumilio) will regularly lay unfertilized eggs for the developing tadpoles to feed on.

== Fossil record ==
Despite their soft-bodied nature and lack of mineralised hard parts, fossil tadpoles (around 10 cm in length) have been recovered from Upper Miocene strata. They are preserved by virtue of biofilms, with more robust structures (the jaw and bones) preserved as a carbon film. In Miocene fossils from Libros, Spain, the brain case is preserved in calcium carbonate, and the nerve cord in calcium phosphate. Other parts of the tadpoles' bodies exist as organic remains and bacterial biofilms, with sedimentary detritus present in the gut. Tadpole remains with telltale external gills are also known from several labyrinthodont groups. The oldest unambiguous fossil, a tadpole of the species Notobatrachus deguistioi from the Middle Jurassic, was published on in 2024.

== Human use ==
Tadpoles are used in a variety of cuisines. Tadpoles of the megophryid frog Oreolalax rhodostigmatus are particularly large, more than 10 cm (3.9 in) in length, and are collected for human consumption in China. In Peru Telmatobius mayoloi tadpoles are collected for both food and medicine.

== Mythology and history ==
According to Sir George Scott, in the origin myths of the Wa people in China and Myanmar, the first Wa originated from two female ancestors Ya Htawm and Ya Htai, who spent their early phase as tadpoles ("rairoh") in a lake in the Wa country known as Nawng Hkaeo.

In the Ancient Egyptian numerals, a hieroglyphic representing a tadpole was used to denote the value of 100,000.
