= Siyuan Zhuji =

Chinese performance artist

Siyuan Zhuji (Chinese: 司原逐冀) is a Chinese artist whose works include Dreams and Bones (梦与骨), Digital Explosion (数字爆破), and Tongtian Tower (通天塔). His works often revolve themes of death, dense objects, and ethical taboos.

== Biography ==
In 2019, during Qingming Festival, he exhumed his deceased father's remains and posed nude for a photo with them, sparking controversy. Many commentators criticized this as an attention-seeking act that insulted ancestors and violated public morals, but some argued it could reduce the fear of people against the death.

During the COVID-19 pandemic in 2022, he placed a miniature camera inside his mouth to record the "being poked" experience during every nucleic acid test.
