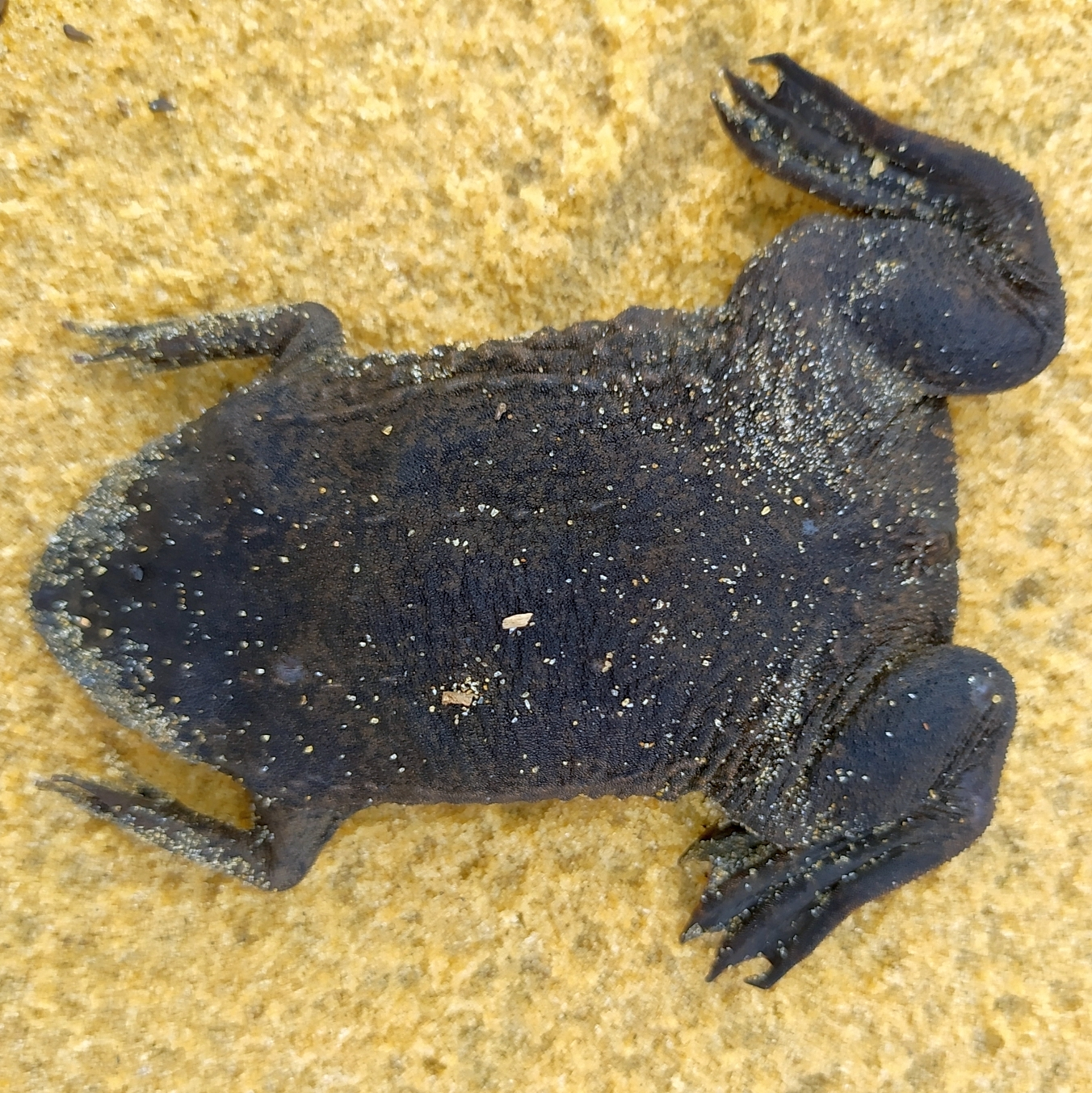
- French Guiana

Conservation status
- Least Concern (IUCN 3.1)

Scientific classification
- Kingdom: Animalia
- Phylum: Chordata
- Class: Amphibia
- Order: Anura
- Family: Pipidae
- Genus: Pipa
- Species: P. snethlageae

Binomial name
- Pipa snethlageae Müller, 1914.

= Pipa snethlageae =

Species of frog

Pipa snethlageae, the Utinga Surinam toad, is a species of frog in the family Pipidae found in Brazil, Colombia, Peru, and possibly Venezuela. Its natural habitats are subtropical or tropical moist lowland forests and freshwater marshes. It is threatened by habitat loss.
