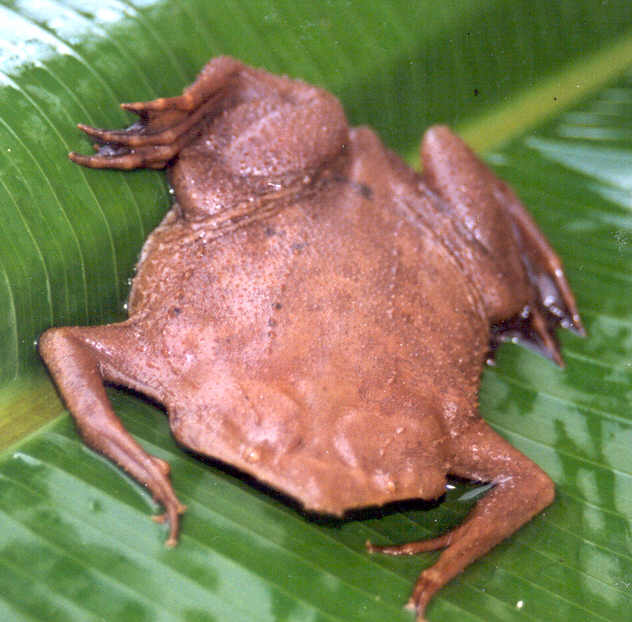

Conservation status
- Least Concern (IUCN 3.1)

Scientific classification
- Kingdom: Animalia
- Phylum: Chordata
- Class: Amphibia
- Order: Anura
- Family: Pipidae
- Genus: Pipa
- Species: P. pipa

Binomial name
- Pipa pipa (Linnaeus, 1758)
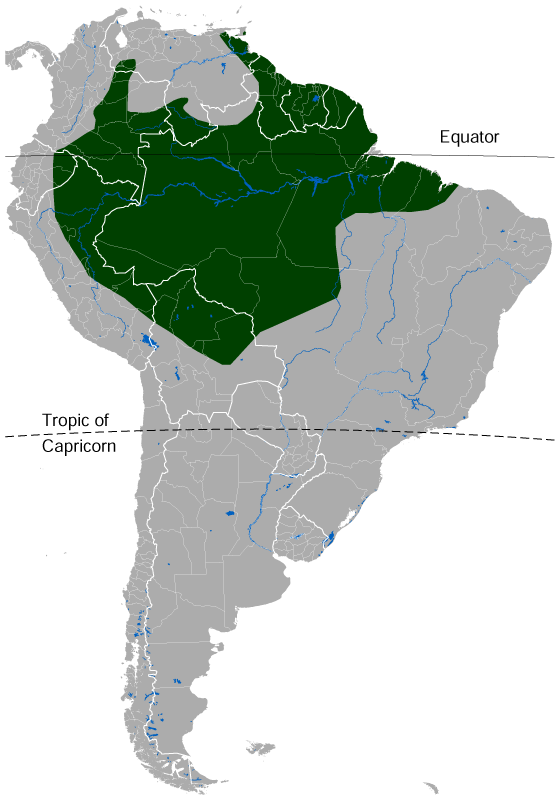
- Surinam toad range.

Synonyms
- Rana pipa Linnaeus, 1758; Pipa americana Laurenti, 1768

= Common Surinam toad =

Species of frog

The common Surinam toad, the Suriname toad, or star-fingered toad (Pipa pipa), is a fully-aquatic species of frog, in the family Pipidae, with a widespread range across much of tropical South America and the island of Trinidad. The females of this species are well-known for "incubating" their eggs on their backs, in honeycomb-like depressions directly within the skin, releasing fully-formed froglets after a period of 4–5 months. Pipa pipa is an ambush predator, lying in-wait underwater for prey to inevitably wander too close, swiftly inhaling the unsuspecting creature using suction feeding. Additionally, the Surinam toad's rather flat body shape, combined with rather dark, dull coloration, serves as effective camouflage in the murky waters they inhabit, mimicking a dead leaf or piece of rotting wood as they await their next meal.

== Description ==
P. pipa is a strictly aquatic frog and the largest member of its genus. The species has an exceptionally depressed body, almost entirely flat and with a broad, flat, triangular head, without a tongue. The body is similar in appearance to a mottled brown leaf. The feet are broadly webbed with the front toes having small, star-like appendages. Males can grow up to 154 mm (6.1 in) long, whereas females can reach up to 171 mm (6.7 in). Females can be distinguished not only by their length but also by their ring-shaped cloacas, visible when they are ready to breed. The skin color is mostly light brown with some darker spots on the back, providing good camouflage Nostrils are terminal, eyes very small, and the tympanum is missing. The limbs are in a laterally sprawled position in the plane of the body, and the fingertips are modified into four small lobes. Absence of a tongue prevents the species from capturing prey with that organ like most other frogs, and instead suction capture is used.

The skull is hyperossified and the cranial and postcranial bones are heavily modified compared to other anurans. While the eyes are relatively small and narrow, the species has a lateral line system and neuromast organs which are assumed to help it locate prey and predators.

The Surinam toad lacks dermal antimicrobial peptides that may inhibit disease agents such as chytridiomycosis and Ranavirus, which could make it slightly more susceptible to disease.

== Habitat and distribution ==
The Surinam toad, despite its common name, is actually native to several South American countries; as well as Suriname, it is known from Brazil (primarily the states of Acre, Amazonas, Mato Grosso, Pará and Rondônia), Bolivia, Colombia, Ecuador, French Guiana, Guyana, and Venezuela, in tropical rainforest regions to the east of the Andes. Additionally, a small population may be found in the southwestern corner of the island of Trinidad, just north of Venezuela across the Columbus Channel. Pipa pipa has the largest geographic distribution within its genus. The Surinam toad inhabits warm, acidic, murky and slow-moving to still waterways, including streams, backwaters, ponds and seasonal pools after localized flooding; these rich waters often have a low pH due to a high concentration of organic matter and tannins.

The Surinam toad is so strongly adapted for an aquatic lifestyle that on land it is helpless and scarcely able to move.

== Diet ==
The species is an omnivorous ambush hunter. Its diet consists mostly of aquatic invertebrates (such as worms, insects and crustaceans) and small fish. Field caught Pipa pipa have been found with erythrinid fish species, other small Pipa pipa, catfish, arthropods and amphibian skin in their stomachs. One study found that Cyclopoida made up 67%, Diptera larvae 7.3%, and Heteroptera 6.3% of prey. The skin fragments that were found in their stomach are an indication that these frogs commit cannibalism or eat their own skin which is common among amphibians. Based on these results, P. pipa is an ambush predator that will opportunistically eat anything that falls into the water or that it may encounter when occasionally foraging on land.

== Feeding behavior ==
P. pipa employs a unique inertial suction feeding mechanism. The Surinam toad catches prey by entraining large volumes of water for ingestion and by limiting fish escape with its fingers. It uses bidirectional suction, a process the frog initiates by depressing its hyoid and retracting its clavicle.

The amount of entrained water the frog can ingest is related to its ability to actively increase its body volume. The frog's buccopharyngeal cavity (the cavity connecting the mouth and the pharynx) is very distensible and can expand substantially. It uses its entire trunk to rapidly enlarge the cavity, which expands into the lower end of the trunk. Its visceral organs— the hyoid and larynx, heart, lungs, liver, esophagus, and stomach— are arranged so as to be capable of moving rearward by up to a third of the length of the body; this gives additional space for expansion of the buccopharyngeal cavity. Laboratory observations estimate P. pipa can achieve an increase in trunk volume of 1.5 times the resting volume. The rapid (in c. 12–24 milliseconds) expansion of the buccopharyngeal cavity results in negative pressure; this creates the suction which, in turn, entrains the water containing the prey. The fish are effectively siphoned into the expanded buccopharyngeal cavity, where it remains for a time, located centrally in the trunk of the frog, not the stomach. The siphoned water is released through the frog's partially open mouth, as its internal pressure returns to normal, while its forelimbs remain raised close to the mouth, guarding against the possibility of prey escape.

The species may be the only tetrapod vertebrate that can enlarge its entire trunk during suction feeding. Additionally, it has been found that P. pipa can modulate the timing of most elements of its prey capture process. For instance, it can asymmetrically or asynchronously move its jaw during the capture and manipulation of its prey.

The forelimbs are used to "scoop" the prey into the mouth. Prior to capture of its prey, the forelimbs are held in a forward-flexed position so that each hand is positioned in front of the head. During prey capture, the forelimbs are extended and drawn towards the mouth. If the prey item is encountered during this movement, it is grabbed and pushed into the mouth. Otherwise it is sucked into the mouth without any use of the limbs. These frogs have a high degree of dexterity compared to other pipid species.

== Reproduction ==
The mating period of these frogs is during the fall and winter seasons. These frogs call usually during the morning and mid-afternoon hours. Males of this species do not attract females with croaks, instead producing a sharp clicking sound by snapping the hyoid bone in their throats. The clicking sound resembles metallic noises. The average rate of these clicks is four clicks per second, consisting of blocks of 10 to 20 seconds per period. Thereafter, the male will grab the front legs of the female in amplexus, causing the cloaca and the skin of the female to swell. The partners rise from the floor while in amplexus and flip through the water in arcs. The couple will swim around in the water until they have to swim to the surface to breathe. Afterwards, they will swim back down to the bottom of the water. There the male will lay on his back, with the female on top of him on her stomach. During the amplexus, the female's back is gradually swelled to a puffy condition. The male and female cloacae are brought close together, and many eggs are transferred anteriorly to the female's swollen dorsal epidermis.

The eggs, each around 6.5 mm (0.26 in) in diameter, then become implanted into the female's dorsal epidermis. During the first day the eggs on the female's back will sink into the skin and by evening will be set into the back of the female. Two days later, the yolks of most of the eggs are beneath the skin level and only parts of the jelly and outer membranes of the eggs are visible on the backs above. The coverings over the eggs will remain in the wild until the brood emerges. The embryos develop through to the tadpole stage inside these pockets but do not emerge as tadpoles, instead remaining in their chambers until complete development to toadlet stage. The young toads grow a tail during their growth, but these will only be temporary because they will need the tail for inhaling oxygen. After 12 to 20 weeks, the young toads will hatch as small toads, looking identical to their parents. It takes a while for them to grow bigger since they are only 25 mm long when they are born. Once they have emerged from their mother's back, the toads begin a largely solitary life. After giving birth to the new toads, the mother slowly sheds the thin layer of skin used for birth and can begin the cycle again.

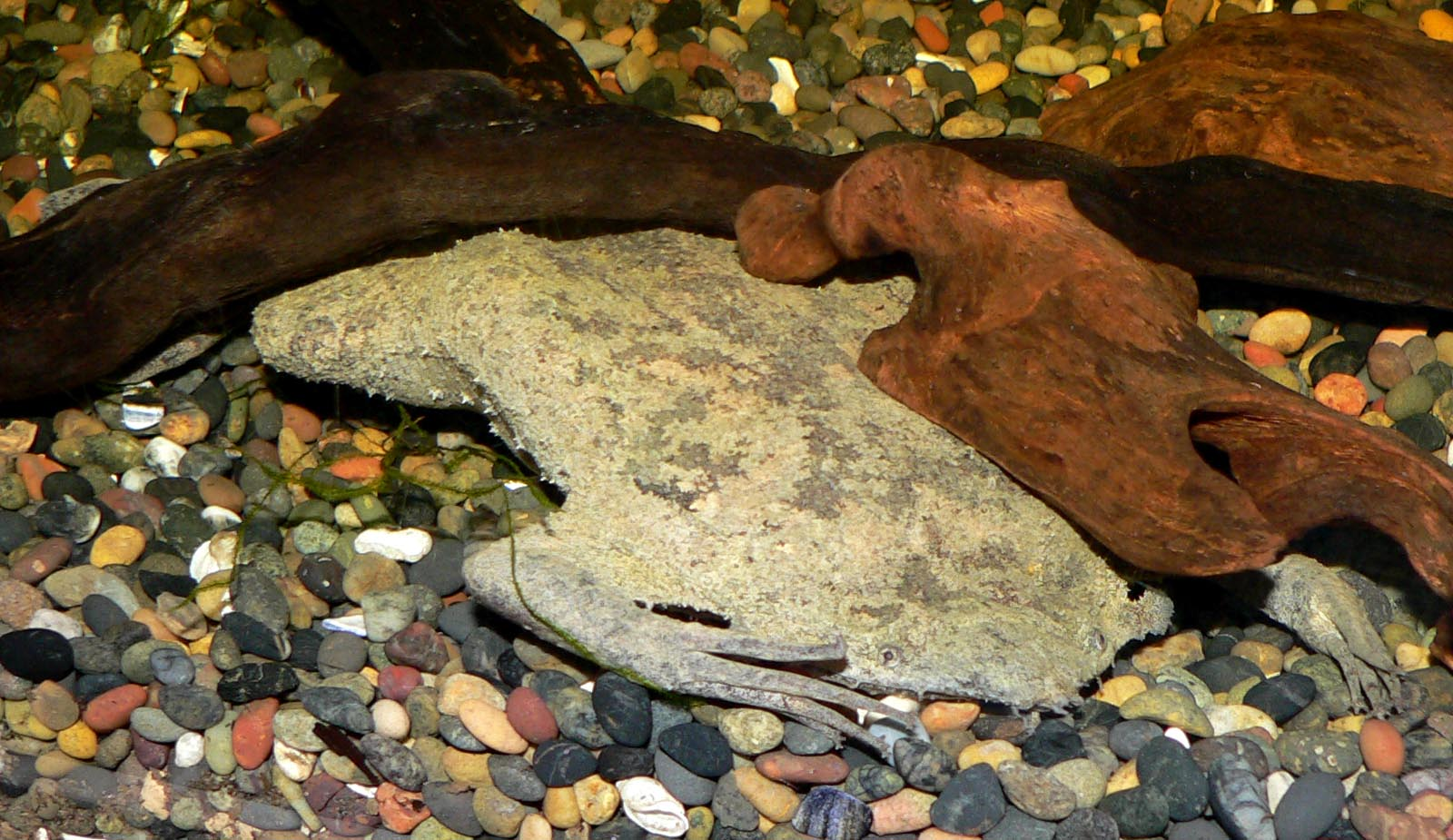
The gray shape is the Surinam toad.

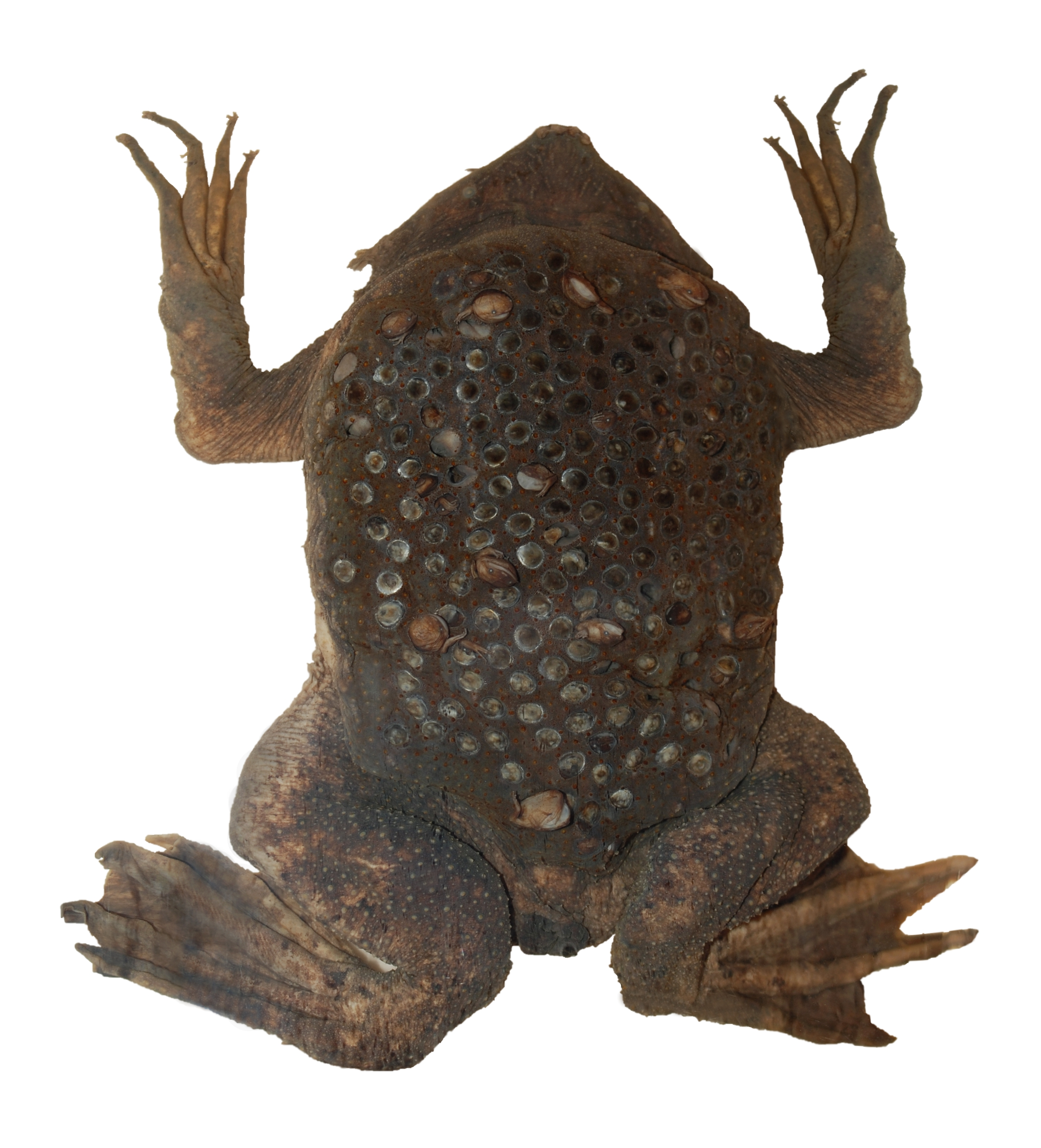
A Surinam toad with eggs embedded in the skin

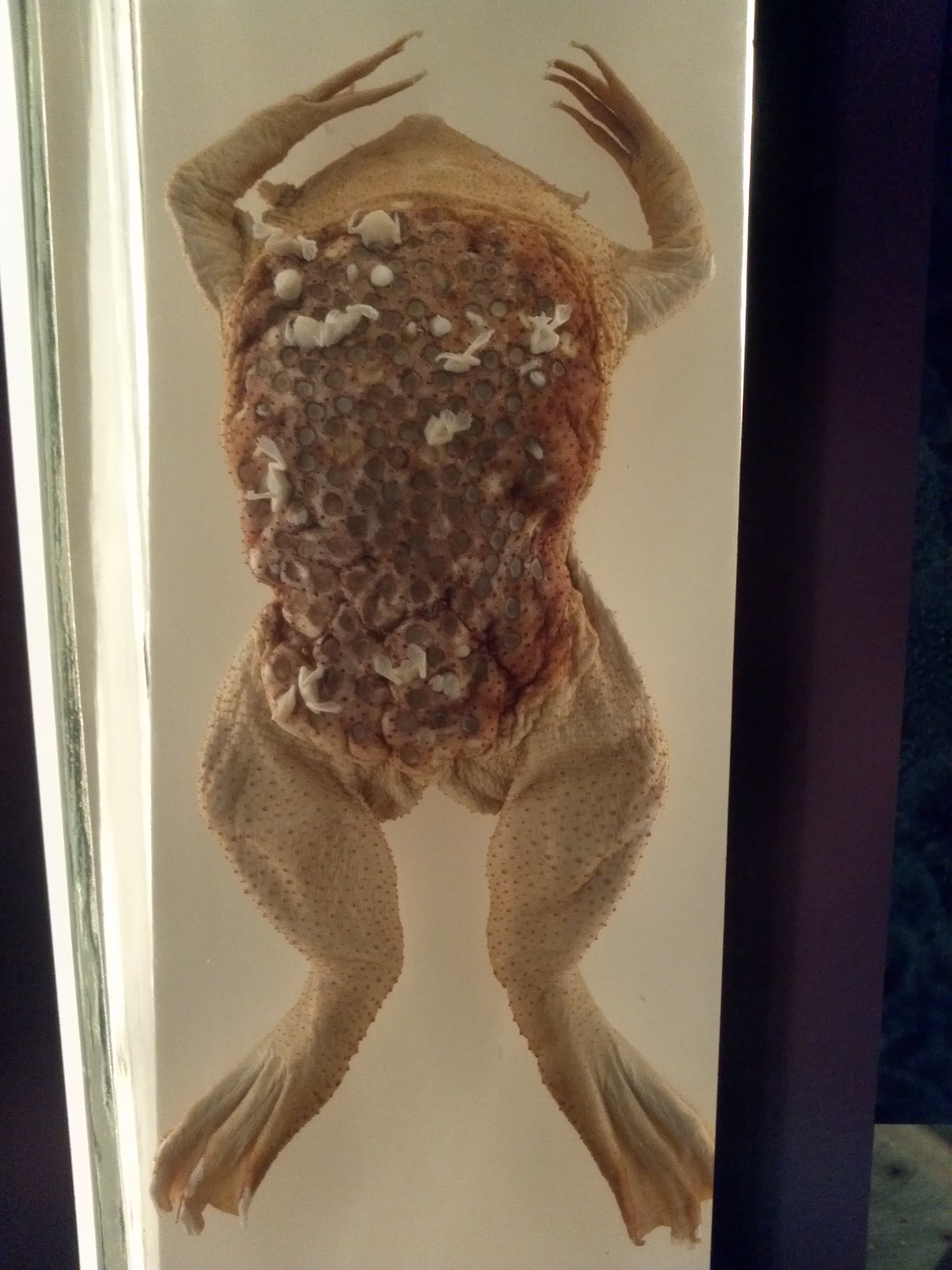
Museum specimen

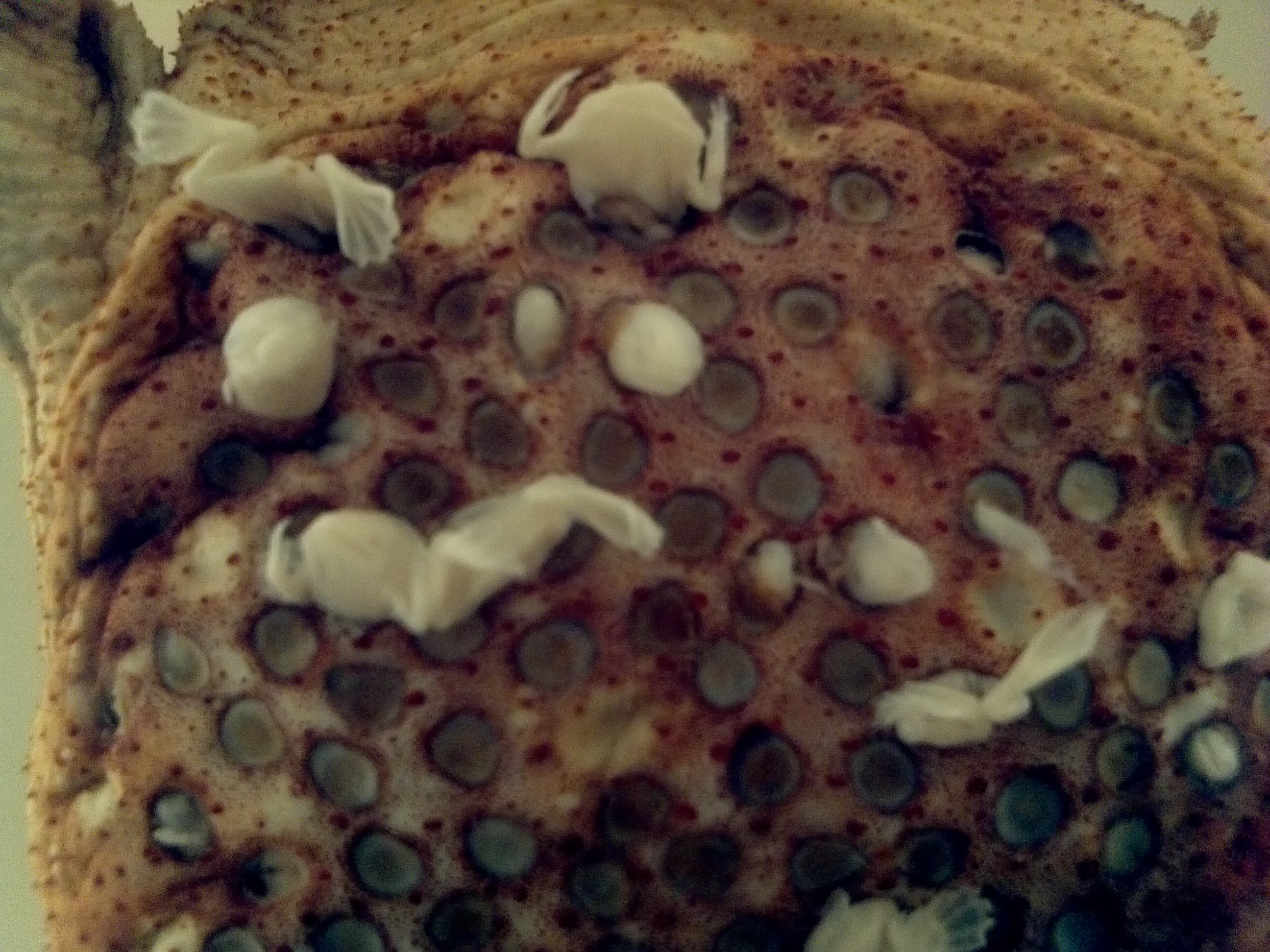
Museum specimen: closeup

=== Mating competition ===
When two males encounter each other during the mating season, there is a possibility that the two males will fight. The toads nearly press their snout to the chest or throat of the other male. During the conflict, both males make single clicks to each other, which resembles the sound that they normally use during breeding. If the toads have eye contact, they make a rapid series of these clicks. This process shows no visible movement of the vocal system. After some time, they will return to swimming, but will never lose contact with one another. One toad swims very closely above the other, touching his rival with only the front limbs. The fight between males may be long-lasting. Eventually, one of the males bites the other male and this is supposed to be the end of their encounter, although they do not always give up the fight. It may happen that the male that loses the battle does not give up and disturbs the breeding pair itself, even during reproduction.

== Conservation ==
Although the species is classified as Least Concern by the IUCN, it is subject to habitat loss and habitat fragmentation caused by agricultural expansions. Due to the deforestation and human encroachment on the Amazon rainforest, the species has been found in regions where it would not normally be encountered, such as terrestrial locations. This highlights the importance of preserving the endangered habitats that these frogs live in.

== Captivity ==
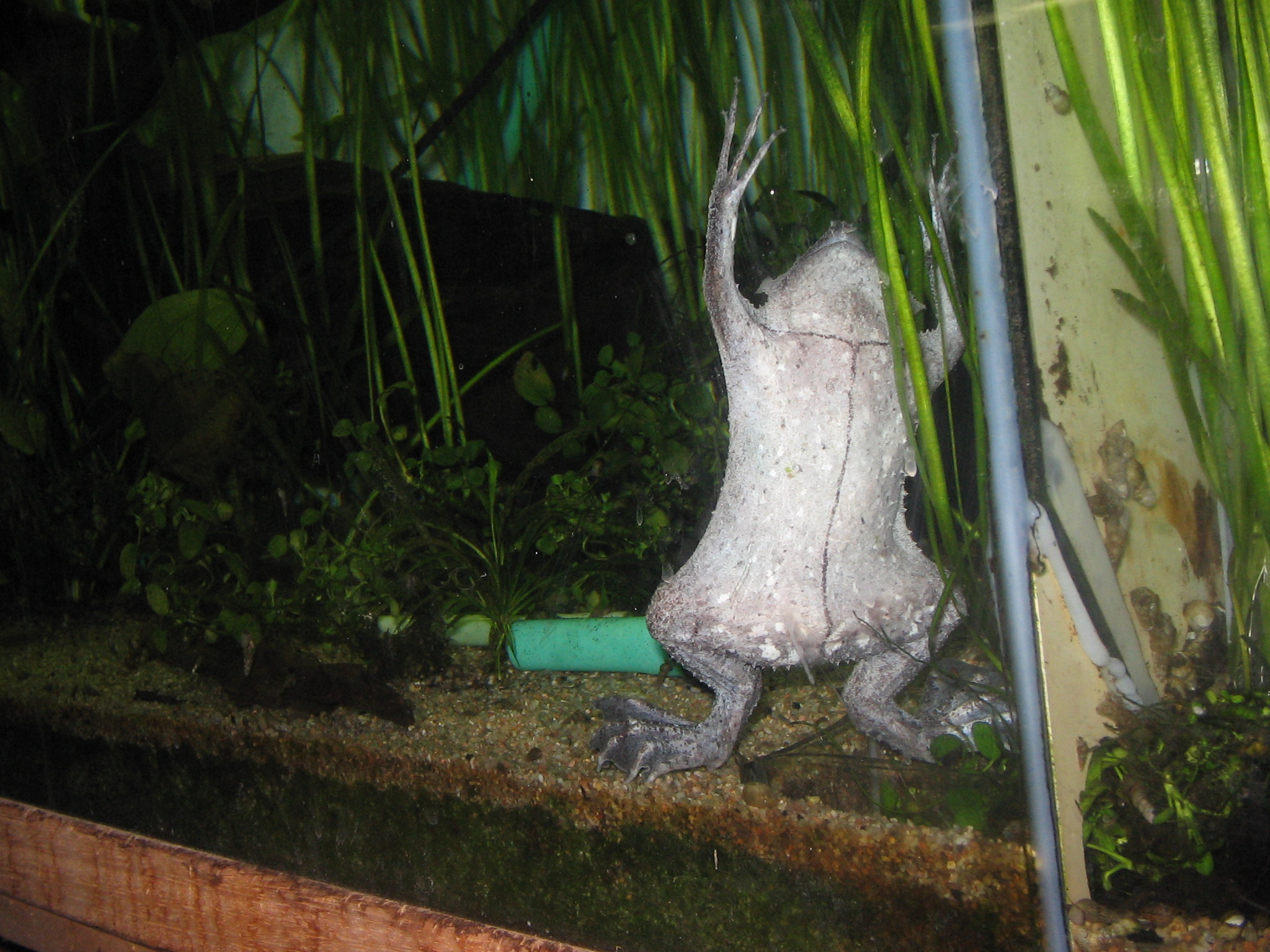
Pipa pipa in captivity

In the aquarium, the species prefers plants and rocks to hide behind. Low light conditions are required. Because the Surinam toad excretes high amounts of ammonia, water changes have to be frequent.

== Cultural significance ==
In a letter to Catherine Clarkson the poet Samuel Taylor Coleridge writes "I envy dear Southey's power of saying one thing at a time in short and close sentences, whereas my thoughts bustle along like a Surinam Toad, with little toads sprouting out of back, side, and belly, vegetating while it crawls".

The Surinam toad is commonly cited as an example of a trypophobia trigger.
