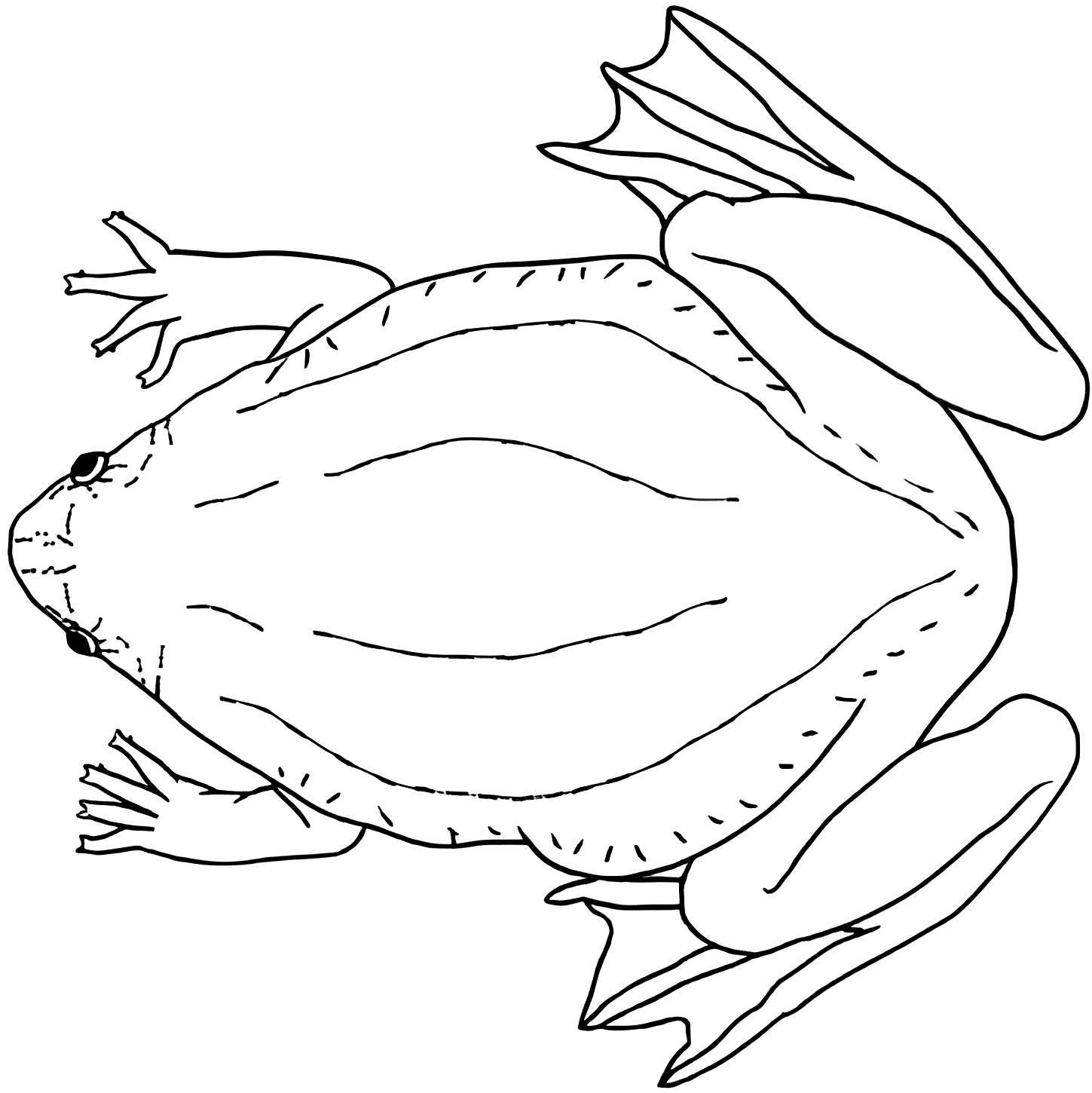

Conservation status
- Endangered (IUCN 3.1)

Scientific classification
- Kingdom: Animalia
- Phylum: Chordata
- Class: Amphibia
- Order: Anura
- Family: Pipidae
- Genus: Pipa
- Species: P. myersi

Binomial name
- Pipa myersi Trueb, 1984

= Myers' Surinam toad =

Species of frog

Myers' Surinam toad (Pipa myersi) is a species of frog in the family Pipidae found in Panama and possibly Colombia. Its natural habitats are subtropical or tropical moist lowland forests and rivers. It is threatened by habitat loss.
