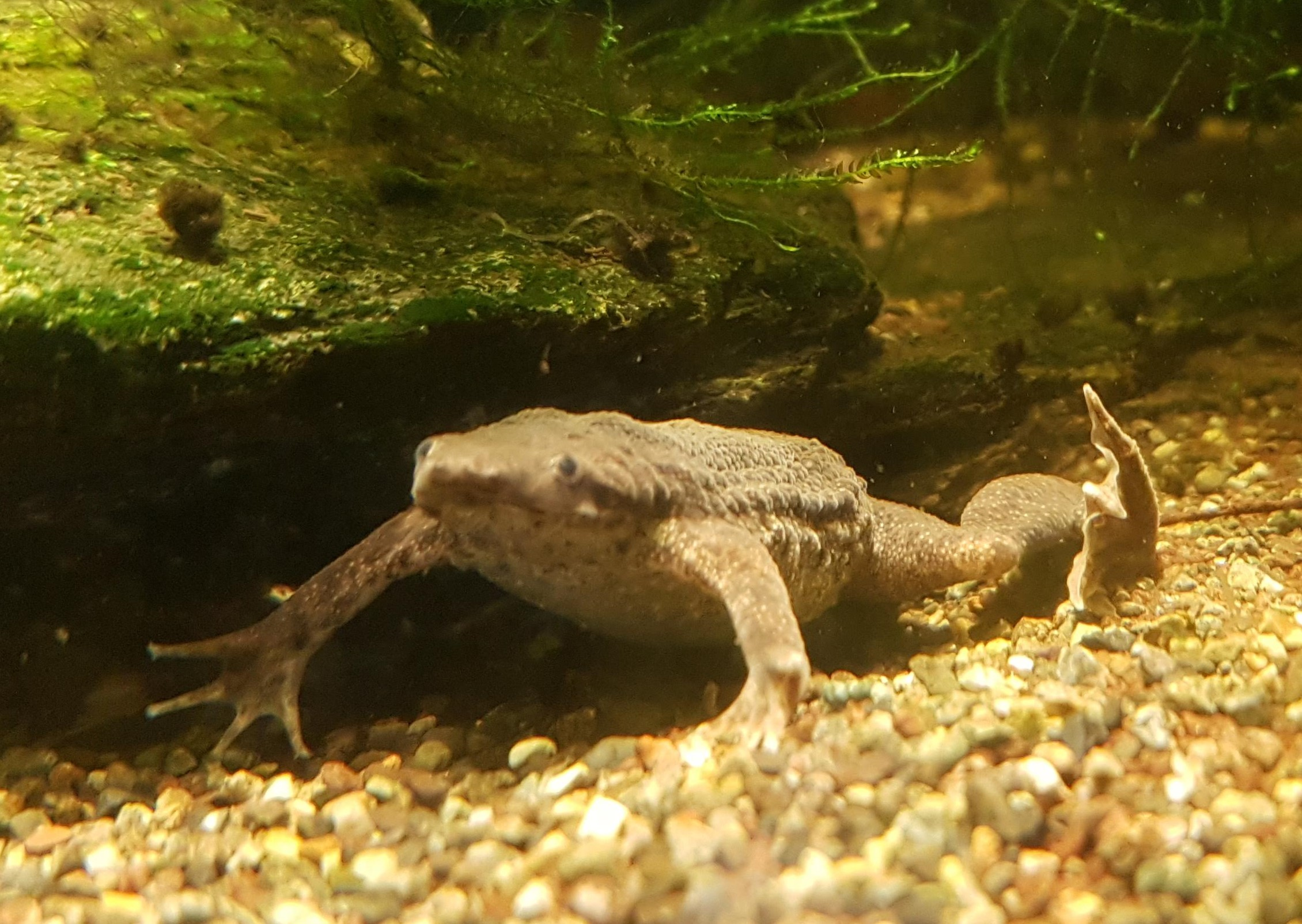

Conservation status
- Least Concern (IUCN 3.1)

Scientific classification
- Kingdom: Animalia
- Phylum: Chordata
- Class: Amphibia
- Order: Anura
- Family: Pipidae
- Genus: Pipa
- Species: P. parva

Binomial name
- Pipa parva Ruthven and Gaige, 1923

Synonyms
- Protopipa parva (Ruthven and Gaige, 1923)

= Sabana Surinam toad =

Species of frog

The Sabana Surinam toad (Pipa parva), also known as the dwarf toad, is a species of frog in the family Pipidae. It is found in northwestern Venezuela and northeastern Colombia (Norte de Santander and La Guajira Departments), mainly in the Maracaibo Basin. There is an introduced (and expanding) population in the Lake Valencia Basin in northern Venezuela.

== Description ==
Adult males measure 28–37 mm (1.1–1.5 in) and females 27–44 mm (1.1–1.7 in) in snout–vent length. The head is narrow in the dorsal view, and the snout is pointed; the eyes are large. The body is relatively slender. Skin is tuberculate. The webbing between the fingers and toes is transparent.

== Habitat and conservation ==
Its natural habitats are lakes, ponds, and marshes in flat, open areas, such as grassland and flooded habitats. They are able to cross land areas. In Venezuela, its altitudinal range is from sea level up to 300 m (980 ft) above sea level, whereas in Colombia it is 50–135 m (164–443 ft). The female carries the eggs on her back, from where the hatching tadpoles emerge into water where the development continues.

Pipa parva is a very common species that may even be treated as a pest. There are no known threats (pest control seems to have a negligible impact on populations). On the contrary, the potential expansion of this species into the Orinoco Basin is seen as a threat.
