= Arrabal's Suriname toad =

Conservation status
- Least Concern (IUCN 3.1)

Scientific classification
- Kingdom: Animalia
- Phylum: Chordata
- Class: Amphibia
- Order: Anura
- Family: Pipidae
- Genus: Pipa
- Species: P. arrabali

Binomial name
- Pipa arrabali Izeckson, 1976

Species of frog

The Arrabal's Suriname toad (Pipa arrabali) is a species of frog in the family Pipidae found in Brazil, Guyana, Suriname, Venezuela, and possibly Peru. Its natural habitats are subtropical or tropical moist lowland forests, freshwater marshes, intermittent freshwater marshes, ponds, and canals and ditches. It is threatened by habitat loss.

The embryo of P. arrabali lacks a jaw sheath and labial teeth, unlike most tadpoles.
