= Ontological parasite =

In ontology, a parasite is something which exists only in reference to something else. That is, it is a thing which can only exist as a feature, quality, or absence of another thing.

A common example of an ontological parasite is a hole, which is described as "always in something else and cannot exist in isolation" as well as "immaterial: every hole has a material "host" (the stuff around it, such as the edible part of a donut) and it may have a material "guest" (such as the liquid filling a cavity), but it does not itself seem to be made of matter".

== Examples of ontological parasites ==
There is some inconsistency regarding what constitutes an ontological parasite. This inconsistency concerns whether something can be said to only exist as an aspect of its host. More debated examples in the list below include color and shape:

- A hole
- A boundary: "Most realist theories about boundaries, construed as lower-dimensional entities, share the view that such entities are ontological parasites: points, lines, and surfaces cannot be separated and cannot exist in isolation from the entities they bound
- Color*
- Shape*
- Cave

*Some philosophers consider all properties of / relations between things (such as shape and color) as ontologically parasitic

== Theories ==
The concept of ontological parasites presents a number of philosophical theories and thought-experiments about the "existence" of the parasite itself, such as the perceptions of the absence of something (such as a hole) as itself a thing, and the categorization of parasites as having lower ontological dimension than their hosts.
