= Pipa aspera =

Conservation status
- Least Concern (IUCN 3.1)

Scientific classification
- Domain: Eukaryota
- Kingdom: Animalia
- Phylum: Chordata
- Class: Amphibia
- Order: Anura
- Family: Pipidae
- Genus: Pipa
- Species: P. aspera

Binomial name
- Pipa aspera Müller, 1924

Species of frog

Pipa aspera, the Albina Surinam toad, is a species of frog in the family Pipidae found in French Guiana, Suriname, and possibly Brazil. Its natural habitats are subtropical or tropical moist lowland forests, rivers, freshwater marshes, and intermittent freshwater marshes. The color of this species is a reddish-brown to a brownish-black, noticed on the dorsal part of its body. The weights of females range between 5 and 12 grams, and males between 4 and 7 grams, noting that females are usually significantly larger.
