= Ommetaphobia =

Irrational fear of eyes

Ommetaphobia, ommatophobia, ophthalmophobia, or rarely oculophobia, is an irrational fear of eyes.

== Symptoms ==
- Avoidance of situations where eye contact, touching the eye, or having the eyes touched is likely or required. While this can work in short-term situations, long-term avoidance can worsen ommetaphobia by providing a justification for the fear. In some cases, an ommetaphobe may try to actively prevent a triggering situation from happening.
- Periods of heightened anxiety or panic attacks when ommetaphobia is triggered. This includes physical symptoms, such as nausea, rapid breathing, and sweating, as well as mental symptoms, such as feelings of panic and lost control. Depending on the severity of the panic attack, the individual experiencing it may need to be hospitalised. These symptoms can last for several minutes after the affected individual is no longer near the triggering object or situation.
- For some, ommetaphobia can manifest as the unrealistic fear that they are in danger of an eye injury.
- For those with comorbid social anxiety disorder, ommetaphobia triggered by eye contact can further worsen symptoms of social anxiety.

== Triggers ==
- Eye contact and situations that may prompt or require it, such as public or face-to-face speech.
- Touching the eye or having the eyes touched, such as eye examinations or the application of contact lenses or eye makeup.
- Injury to the eye, or foreign substances (such as sand or shampoo) entering the eye.
- The use of eye masks.
- Fake eyes or images of eyes.
- The thought of eyes or any of the above triggers.

Not everyone with ommetaphobia is triggered by the same objects or situations. For example, an ommetaphobe can be triggered by having to touch their eyes, but not by eye contact with other people.

== See also ==
- Scopophobia, the fear of being seen or stared at.
- Specific phobias, a type of phobia associated with a specific object or situation.
- Anxiety disorders, a range of mental disorders that phobias are a part of.
- Trypophobia, fear of small holes or clusters.
