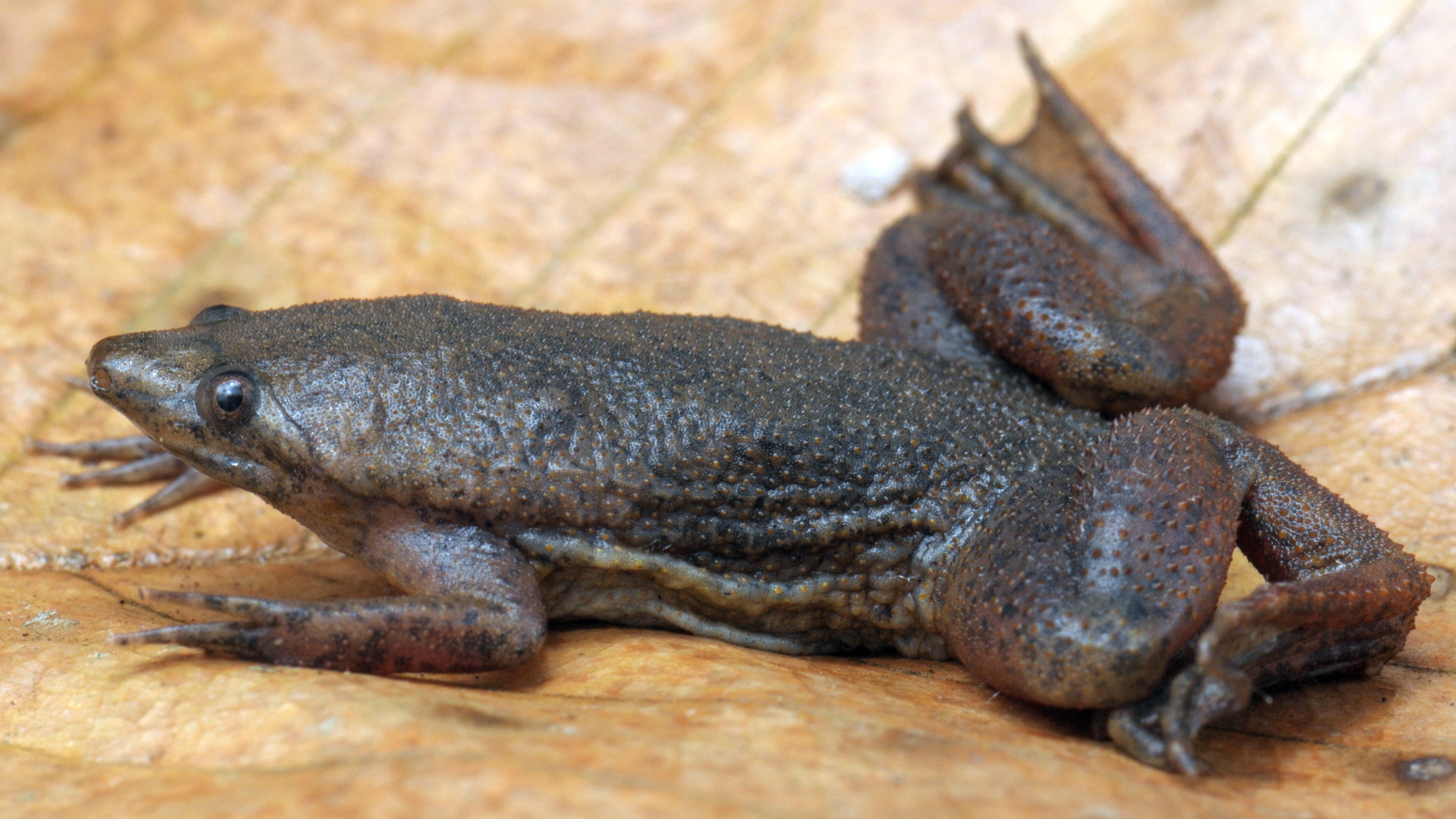

Conservation status
- Least Concern (IUCN 3.1)

Scientific classification
- Kingdom: Animalia
- Phylum: Chordata
- Class: Amphibia
- Order: Anura
- Family: Pipidae
- Genus: Pipa
- Species: P. carvalhoi

Binomial name
- Pipa carvalhoi (Miranda-Ribeiro, 1937)

= Carvalho's Surinam toad =

Species of frog

Carvalho's Surinam toad (Pipa carvalhoi) is a species of frog in the family Pipidae endemic to Brazil. Its natural habitats are subtropical or tropical dry forests, dry savanna, moist savanna, subtropical or tropical dry shrubland, subtropical or tropical moist shrubland, freshwater marshes, ponds, and aquaculture ponds. It is threatened by habitat loss.
