= Trypophobia =

Aversion of objects with small, irregular shaped holes

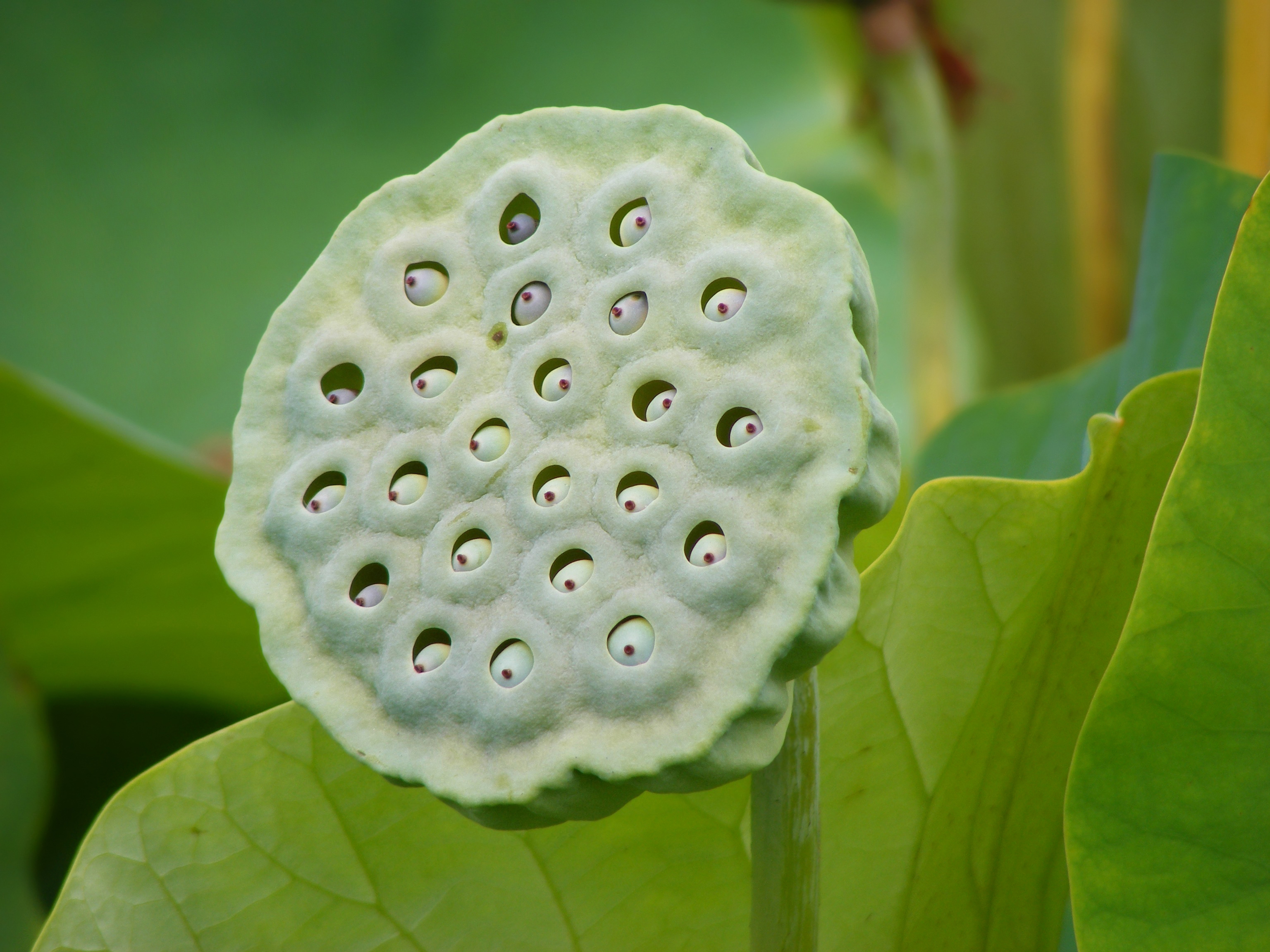
- The holes in lotus seed heads elicit feelings of discomfort or repulsion in some people.
- Pronunciation: /ˌtrɪpəˈfəʊbi.ə/ Tri-poe-FOH-bee-ə
- Symptoms: Disgust, Nausea, Physical discomfort, Cringe-feeling, Panic attacks
- Risk factors: Family history
- Treatment: Exposure therapy

Trypophobia is the aversion of the sight of repetitive patterns or clusters, of small holes or bumps. Although not clinically recognized as a separate mental or emotional disorder, trypophobia can possibly fall under the category of "specific phobia" in cases where it causes excessive fear or distress or primarily disgust. Sufferers often primarily experience disgust when they see trypophobic imagery, although some experience equal levels of both fear and disgust.

Historically, trypophobia has not been well-studied, but recent research has improved the understanding of its causes. Some researchers hypothesize that biological revulsion causes trypophobia through an association of certain shapes with danger or disease and that exposure therapy may be a possible treatment.

The term trypophobia was coined by an anonymous female member of an online forum in 2005. It has since become a common topic on social networking sites.

== Etymology ==
The term trypophobia comes from Ancient Greek: τρῦπα, trŷpa, meaning "hole" and φόβος, phóbos. meaning "fear".

== Classification ==
Trypophobia is not recognized as a mental disorder and thus is not associated with a specific diagnosis in the American Psychiatric Association's Diagnostic and Statistical Manual, Fifth Edition (DSM-5). However, it may fall under the broad category of specific phobias when it involves excessive, persistent and possibly irrational fear, and is associated with significant distress or even impairment.

Whether trypophobia can be accurately defined as a specific phobia, it may depend on whether the person suffering responds mainly with fear or disgust. Because phobias involve fear, a response to trypophobic imagery that is based mostly or solely on disgust renders its status as a specific phobia questionable. In one study, most of the participants with trypophobia met the DSM-5 criteria for a specific phobia, even though they experienced disgust with an absence of fear when shown imagery of clusters of holes; however, they did not meet the distress or impairment criteria.

== Signs and symptoms ==
Trypophobia often presents with an autonomic nervous system response, for example, a cringe reaction. Shapes that elicit a trypophobic reaction usually include clustered holes in innocuous contexts, such as fruit and bubbles, as well as in contexts associated with danger, such as holes made by insects or holes caused by wounds and diseased tissue, for example, caused by mango flies in animals, especially dogs. Upon seeing these shapes, some people said they shuddered, felt their skin crawl, experienced panic attacks, sweated, palpitated or felt nauseated or itchy. Other reported symptoms including goose bumps, body shakes (i.e., cringing), nosebleeds and emotional or visual discomfort (e.g., eyestrain, distortions, illusions.) Trypophobia may manifest also with reactions of fear, disgust or both. Disgust is usually the stronger emotion in those who suffer.

== Causes ==
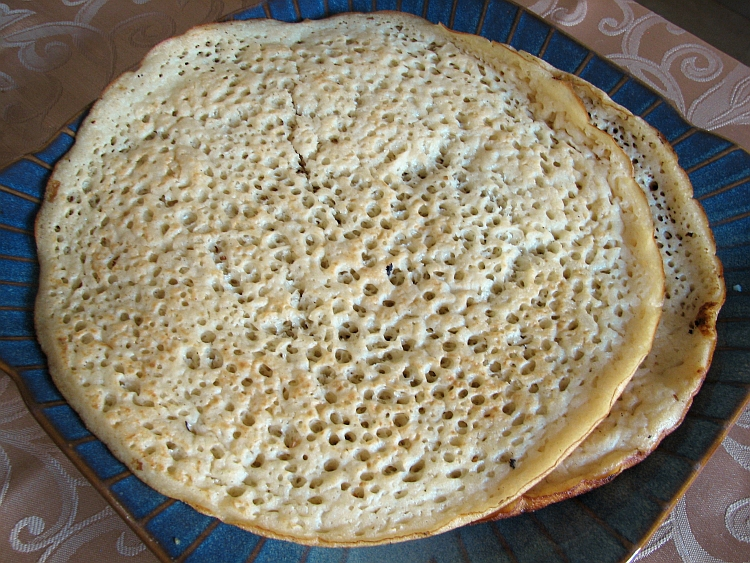
Holes in objects are feared by trypophobes

The understanding of trypophobia is limited. Several possible causes have been proposed. Geoff Cole and Arnold Wilkins believe the reaction is an "unconscious reflex reaction" based on a biological revulsion, rather than a learned cultural fear. Various venomous animals (for example, certain types of snakes, insects, and spiders) have visual characteristics similar to trypophobic imagery. Furthermore, other animals such as the frog Pipa pipa have been known to be a trypophobia trigger. Because of this, it is hypothesized that trypophobia has an evolutionary basis meant to alert humans of dangerous organisms. Can et al., however, believe the connection between trypophobia and evolution as a result of a threat from deadly creatures to be weak and that, if a connection does exist, it manifests later in life rather than in childhood.

Martínez-Aguayo et al. described trypophobia as usually involving "an intense and disproportionate fear towards holes, repetitive patterns, protrusions, etc., and, in general, images that present high-contrast energy at low and mid-range spatial frequencies." Cole and Wilkins also stated the imagery has high spatial frequency with greater energy at mid-range. Whether together or separate, it appears that low and mid-range spatial frequencies are necessary for inducing trypophobic reactions. Based on the imagery's visual cues, An Trong Dinh Le, Cole, and Wilkins developed a symptom questionnaire that they believe can be used to identify trypophobia.

Researchers have also speculated that trypophobic reactions could be perceived as cues to infectious disease, which could be alerts that give one a survival advantage. In a study by Kupfer and Le, trypophobic and non-trypophobic participants showed significant aversion to disease-relevant cluster images, but only trypophobic participants displayed a significant aversion to disease-irrelevant cluster images. Martínez-Aguayo et al. stated that, because the reactions could not be attributed to different sensitivity levels or neuroticism differences, Kupfer and Le believe it supports their hypothesis that trypophobia is "an overgeneralized aversion towards cluster stimuli that indicates a parasitic and infectious disease threat". Yamada and Sasaki also propose that trypophobic reactions are due to the imagery's visual similarities to skin diseases.

Whether trypophobia is associated with obsessive–compulsive disorder (OCD) has also been studied. A significant minority of those with trypophobia meet the DSM-5 criteria for an obsessive-compulsive disorder. Martínez-Aguayo et al. stated that other findings refer to trypophobia having common comorbid psychiatric diagnosis, such as major depressive disorder or generalized anxiety disorder, although Le et al. felt that general anxiety does not cause trypophobia.

== Treatment ==
There are no specific treatments for trypophobia, but exposure therapy may be an effective treatment method. The trypophobe will be exposed to images, videos, or a physical object that has the small holes, or clusters, which can stop the phobia.

== Epidemiology ==
The extent to which trypophobia exists is unknown, but the available data suggests that having an aversion to trypophobic imagery is relatively common. 16% of a sample of 286 participants in a 2013 study reported discomfort or repulsion when presented with an image of a lotus seed pod and its authors found that non-trypophobic individuals also experienced more discomfort when viewing trypophobic imagery than when viewing neutral images. Trypophobia appears to be more common in women then men.

== Trypophobia in society and culture ==
Groups on social media sites such as Facebook and Instagram exist for self-identified trypophobics to share and discuss images that they say induce the reaction.

Because trypophobia is not well known to the general public, many people with the condition do not know the name for it and believe that they are alone in their trypophobic reactions and thoughts until they find an online community to share them with. This has led to an increase in trypophobic images on social media; in some cases, people seek to intentionally induce trypophobia in those who have it by showing them trypophobic images, with the most trypophobic response-inducing images being holes and clusters and small or large holes photoshopped onto a human hand or the skin. Cole and Wilkins also stated that the level of disgust with trypophobia increases if the holes are on human skin. Writing in Popular Science, Jennifer Abbasi argues that emotional contagion within such social media groups may be responsible for some of the averse reactions to such images.

In 2017, trypophobia received media attention when American Horror Story featured a trypophobic character, and trypophobic response-inducing advertisements promoting the storyline; some people were disturbed by the imagery, and criticized the show for "insensitivity towards sufferers of trypophobia". Although there was sentiment that the increased media attention could lead to people trying to induce trypophobia, there were also opinions that it might help people understand trypophobia and encourage more research on the matter.

In September 2019, some users responded with the release of Apple's iPhone 11 Pro, which features three closely spaced camera lenses, with comments that it triggered their trypophobia.

Writer and editor Kathleen McAuliffe suggested that trypophobia is yet to be extensively studied because researchers have not given as much attention to topics of disgust as they have to other areas of research, and because of the revulsion viewing the images could incite in researchers.

== See also ==
- List of phobias
- Ommetaphobia
