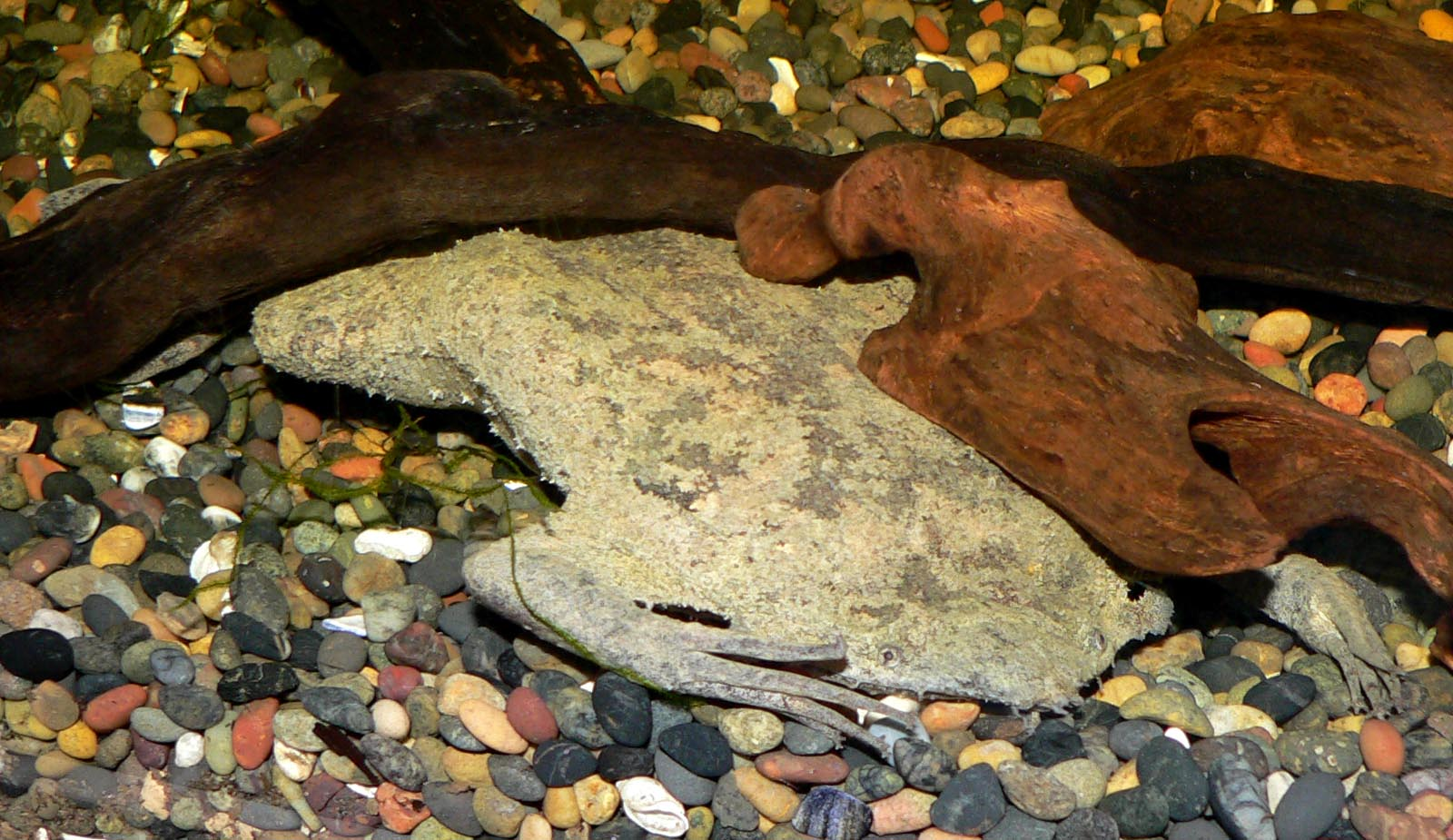
- Gray Pipa pipa under driftwood

Scientific classification
- Kingdom: Animalia
- Phylum: Chordata
- Class: Amphibia
- Order: Anura
- Family: Pipidae
- Genus: Pipa; Laurenti, 1768

Type species
- Pipa pipa Linnaeus, 1758

Species
- Pipa arrabali Pipa aspera Pipa carvalhoi Pipa myersi Pipa parva Pipa pipa Pipa snethlageae

= Pipa (frog) =

Genus of amphibians

Suriname toads are members of the frog genus Pipa, within the family Pipidae. They are native to northern South America and extreme southern Central America (Panama). Like other pipids, these frogs are almost exclusively aquatic.

== Species ==
There are seven recognized species:

- Pipa arrabali Izecksohn, 1976 – Arrabal's Surinam toad
- Pipa aspera Müller, 1924 – Albina Surinam toad
- Pipa carvalhoi (Miranda-Ribeiro, 1937) – Carvalho's Surinam toad
- Pipa myersi Trueb, 1984 – Myers' Surinam toad
- Pipa parva Ruthven and Gaige, 1923 – Sabana Surinam toad
- Pipa pipa (Linnaeus, 1758) – Surinam toad
- Pipa snethlageae Müller, 1914 – Utinga Surinam toad

In addition, Pipa verrucosa Wiegmann, 1832 is included here incertae sedis.

== Ecology and behavior ==
=== Life cycle ===
During reproduction the female Pipa frog will rise to the surface of the water with the male and after a series of movements the male fertilizes the eggs of the female. The male then places the eggs on the females back with its feet. The female Pipa frog will then incubate the eggs in the dorsal (its back). The tadpoles then develop in the dorsal of the female.
