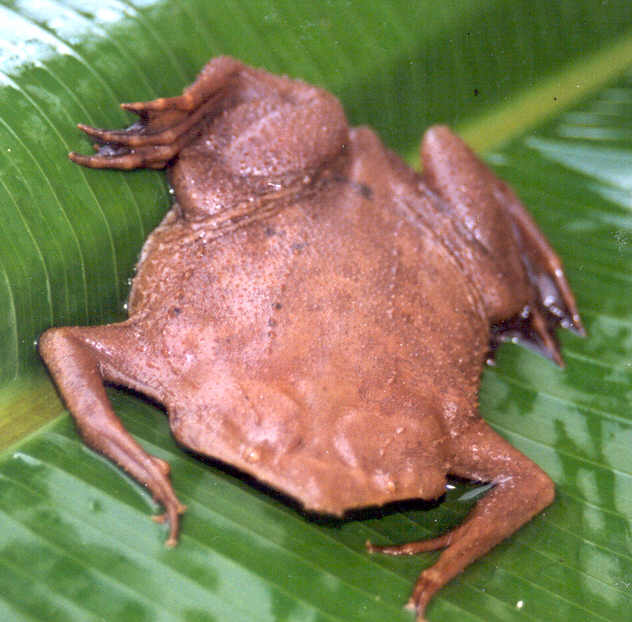
- Pipa pipa, the common Suriname toad (Pipidae)
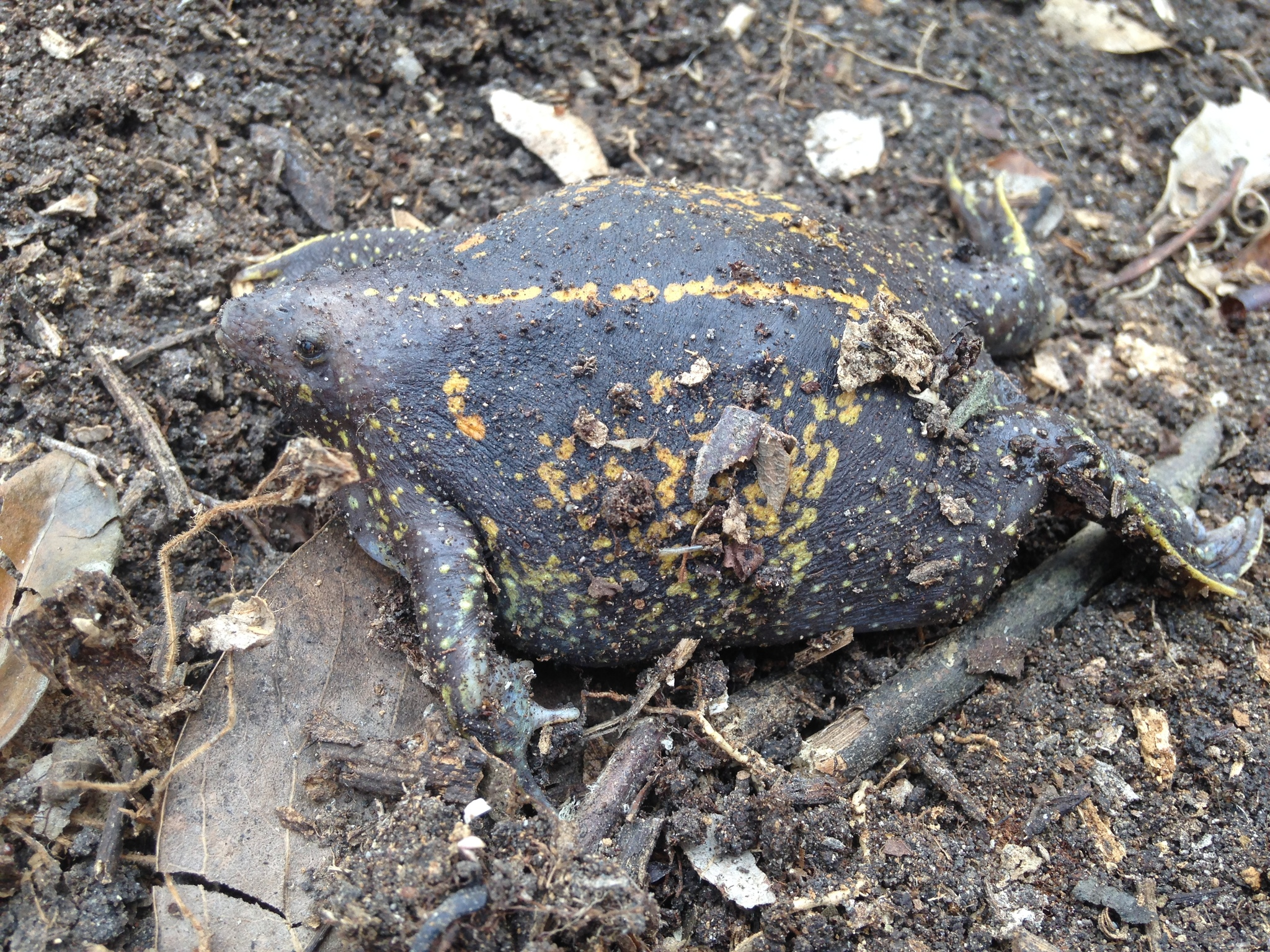
- The Mexican burrowing toad Rhinophrynus dorsalis (Rhinophrynidae)

Scientific classification
- Kingdom: Animalia
- Phylum: Chordata
- Class: Amphibia
- Order: Anura
- Clade: Pipoidea; Laurent in Fuhn, 1960

Subgroups
- See text

= Pipoidea =

Pipoidea Temporal range: Late Jurassic–recent, 155.7–0 Ma

Clade of amphibians

Pipoidea are a clade of frogs, that contains the most recent common ancestor of living Pipidae and Rhinophrynidae as well as all its descendants. It is broadly equivalent to Xenoanura.

== Description ==
The synapomorphies that define Pipoidea are the absence of mentomeckelian bones, absence of lateral alae of the parasphenoid, fusion of the frontoparietals into an azygous element, greatly enlarged otic capsules, and a tadpole with paired spiracles and which lacks beaks and denticles. Later genetic work has supported Pipoidea as a monophyletic group.

== Taxonomy ==
In 1993 Pipoidea was defined by Ford and Cannatella as a node-based taxon. It has variously been defined as a suborder (original definition), superfamily, or an unranked clade. There is no single, authoritative higher-level classification of frogs, and Vitt and Caldwell (2014) use name Xenoanura for a similar clade, skipping Pipoidea altogether, as did Frost et al. (2006).

The oldest record of the group is Rhadinosteus from the Late Jurassic of North America, which is more closely related to Rhinophrynidae than to Pipidae. The oldest records of Pipimorpha (which contains all pipoids more closely related to Pipidae than to Rhinophrynidae) are Aygroua anoualensis from the Tithonian or Berriasian, Neusibatrachus and Gracilibatrachus from the Early Cretaceous of Spain, with other records of the group known from Afro-Arabia and South America like modern Pipidae. The extinct pipimorph family Palaeobatrachidae, particularly the genus Palaeobatrachus were widespread and abundant in Europe during the Cenozoic, until their extinction during the Middle Pleistocene around 500,000 years ago due to being unable to cope with the increasing aridity and freezing temperatures of the ice ages.

Taxonomy after A. M. Aranciaga Rolando et al. 2019

- Rhinophrynidae Late Jurassic-Present
- Pipimorpha Ford and Cannatella, 1993
  - †Neusibatrachus Seiffert 1972 La Pedrera de Rúbies Formation, Spain, Early Cretaceous (Barremian)
  - †Gracilibatrachus Baez 2013 Las Hoyas, Spain, Early Cretaceous (Barremian)
  - †Nevobatrachus Mahony, 2019 (=Cordicephalus Nevo, 1968) Hatira Formation, Israel, Lower Cretaceous
  - †Thoraciliacus Nevo 1968 Hatira Formation, Israel, Lower Cretaceous
  - †Avitabatrachus Báez, Trueb & Calvo, 2000 Candeleros Formation, Late Cretaceous (Cenomanian)
  - †Vulcanobatrachus Trueb et al. 2005 South Africa, Late Cretaceous
  - †Cratopipa Carvalho et al., 2019 Crato Formation, Brazil, Early Cretaceous (Aptian)
  - †Palaeobatrachidae Europe, Late Cretaceous-Middle Pleistocene
    - †Palaeobatrachus Tschudi, 1838 (13+ species) Europe, Middle Eocene-Middle Pleistocene
    - †Albionbatrachus Meszoely, Špinar et Ford, 1984 (2 species) Europe, Eocene-Miocene
  - Clade Panpipidae Aranciaga Rolando et al. 2019
    - †Clade Shelaniinae Aranciaga Rolando et al. 2019
      - †Patagopipa Aranciaga Rolando et al. 2019 Huitrera Formation, Argentina, Eocene
      - †Kuruleufenia Gómez 2016 Allen Formation, Argentina, Late Cretaceous (Campanian-Maastrichtian)
      - †Saltenia Reig 1959 Las Curtiembres Formation, Argentina, Late Cretaceous (Campanian)
      - †Shelania Casamiquela 1960 Laguna del Hunco Formation, Argentina, Eocene
    - Pipidae Gray 1825 Africa, South America, Late Cretaceous (Cenomanian) - Present
