= Thoraciliacus =

Thoraciliacus Temporal range: Lower-Upper Cretaceous, 130.0–66 Ma

Scientific classification
- Domain: Eukaryota
- Kingdom: Animalia
- Phylum: Chordata
- Class: Amphibia
- Order: Anura
- Clade: Pipimorpha
- Genus: †Thoraciliacus; Nevo, 1968
- Species: †T. rostriceps

Binomial name
- †Thoraciliacus rostriceps Nevo, 1968

Extinct genus of amphibians

Thoraciliacus rostriceps is an extinct species of frog from the Cretaceous period and the only species of the genus Thoraciliacus, which is classified in the unranked clade Pipimorpha. A recent phylogenetic analysis confirmed this conclusion, and further suggested that Thoraciliacus rostriceps is more closely related to Pipidae and Shelaniinae than to Palaeobatrachus. Fossils of T. rostriceps were found in Makhtesh Ramon, Negev Desert, Israel and it is believed they lived during the Barremian. Other fossils have been found near Marydale, South Africa in an Upper Cretaceous lake.

== Description ==
Thoraciliacus rostriceps was a small frog, 32 millimetres (1.3 in) in length, with a large head. It had short hind limbs but its hands and feet were relatively large. Like its close relative Nevobatrachus gracilis, T. rostriceps was highly aquatic evidenced by its flat skull, short axial column and long metapodials.

== See also ==
- List of prehistoric amphibians
