= Avitabatrachus =

Avitabatrachus Temporal range: Albian ~111–106 Ma

Scientific classification
- Kingdom: Animalia
- Phylum: Chordata
- Class: Amphibia
- Order: Anura
- Clade: Pipimorpha
- Genus: †Avitabatrachus; Báez et al. 2000
- Species: †A. uliana

Binomial name
- †Avitabatrachus uliana Báez et al. 2000

Extinct genus of frogs

Avitabatrachus uliana is the only species discovered so far in the extinct genus Avitabatrachus, a genus of frogs that lived in the Albian stage of the Early Cretaceous. Fossils of A. uliana were found in the Candeleros Formation of northwestern Patagonia in Argentina. This prehistoric amphibian was properly described in 2000 and was then concluded to be most closely related to Pipidae frogs. Hence, it was included in Pipimorpha. A subsequent phylogenetic analysis confirmed this conclusion, and further suggested that Avitabatrachus uliana is more closely related to Pipidae and Shelaniinae than to Palaeobatrachus.

== Etymology ==
The genus name, Avitabatrachus, is derived from the Greek words avita meaning "ancient" and batrachos meaning "frog", so called because it is the oldest record of pipids in South America. The species is named after Miguel Uliana.
