= Vulcanobatrachus =

Vulcanobatrachus Temporal range: Late Cretaceous

Scientific classification
- Domain: Eukaryota
- Kingdom: Animalia
- Phylum: Chordata
- Class: Amphibia
- Order: Anura
- Genus: †Vulcanobatrachus; Linda Trueb et al., 2005
- Species: †V. mandelai

Binomial name
- †Vulcanobatrachus mandelai Trueb et al., 2005

Extinct genus of frogs

Vulcanobatrachus is an extinct genus of frogs. The genus contains the single species Vulcanobatrachus mandelai found at Marydale, South Africa, described in 2005 and named after Nelson Mandela. The genus owes its name to the fact that fossils were recovered from an extinct volcanic crater lake of Late Cretaceous age. The fossil frogs are assumed to have died following a limnic eruption (a degassing event possibly of CO_{2}) by the volcano.

The existence of fossil specimens was discovered accidentally in the late 1970s during prospecting of the volcanic kimberlite pipe for diamonds by de Beers Mining Company. Specimens of Vulcanobatrachus mandelai are curated by Iziko South African Museum.

It is a member of the clade Pipimorpha, related to the family Pipidae. A recent phylogenetic analysis suggested that Vulcanobatrachus is more closely related to Pipidae and Shelaniinae than to Palaeobatrachus.

== See also ==
- Prehistoric amphibian
- List of prehistoric amphibians
