= Bachmannia =

Bachmannia may refer to:

- Bachmannia (plant), a genus of flowering plants
- Bachmannia (fish), an extinct genus of ray-finned fish
