= Chelomophrynus =

Chelomophrynus Temporal range: Middle Eocene, 46.4–40.4 Ma

Scientific classification
- Kingdom: Animalia
- Phylum: Chordata
- Class: Amphibia
- Order: Anura
- Family: Rhinophrynidae
- Genus: †Chelomophrynus; Henrici, 1991

Type species
- †Chelomophrynus bayi Henrici, 1991

Extinct genus of frogs

Chelomophrynus is an extinct genus of anurans in the family Rhinophrynidae. A single species is known, Chelomophrynus bayi from the Uintan Wagon Bed Formation of Wyoming. It was probably a subterranean feeder, like the modern member of the family, Rhinophrynus dorsalis. As most burrowing anurans, it likely used its hind feet for digging, thereby entering ground backwards.

== See also ==
- Prehistoric amphibian
- List of prehistoric amphibians
