= Saltenia =

Saltenia Temporal range: Campanian ~86–71 Ma
- Fossil of postmetamorphic specimen (Scale bar: 5 mm)

Scientific classification
- Kingdom: Animalia
- Phylum: Chordata
- Class: Amphibia
- Order: Anura
- Family: Pipidae
- Clade: †Xenopodinomorpha
- Genus: †Saltenia; Reig, 1959

Type species
- Saltenia ibanezi Reig, 1959

Extinct genus of frogs

Saltenia is an extinct genus of frogs. It was assigned to the family Pipidae by R. L. Carroll in 1988 and again in 2005 by A. M. Báez and T. Harrison. The single described species, Saltenia ibanezi, is thought to have lived in South America in the Late Cretaceous. Fossils of Saltenia have been found in the Campanian Las Curtiembres Formation of Argentina.

== Description ==
Tadpole

Fossils of Saltenia are first discovered by geologist Miguel Ibáñez, from Salta Province. While original description consisted 25 specimens, later redescription grouped over 300 specimens of fossils to this taxon.

Saltenia is a small pipid frog, with snout-vent length of 18.8 to 27.7 millimetres (0.74 to 1.09 in). It had wide and flanged frontopariental which dorsal surface lack parasagittal crests for muscle attachment. It lacked teeth on premaxillae and maxillae. Parasphenoid is long and narrow, sacrum and urostyle are fused. Tibia and fibula are also fused.

Tadpoles and juvenile specimens are also known, which are unique by having free ribs.

== Classification ==
2006 study considered that its closest living relative are the frogs in the genus Silurana (which is often considered as subgenus of Xenopus). 2023 study classified Saltenia to subfamily Shelaiinae, along with Patagopipa, Shelania, Kuruleufenia.

== Paleoecology ==
Saltenia is the dominated taxon from Las Curtiembres Formation, the site represent fluvial and lacustrine settings. Other fauna from this site includes undescribed teleosts, pleurodiran turtles, mesoeucrocodylian crocodyliform, possible coelurosaurian, and enantiornith Intiornis. Plant remains that probably belongs to bennettitales also known.
