= Franz Ewald Theodor Bachmann =

German botanist and entomologist (1856–1931)

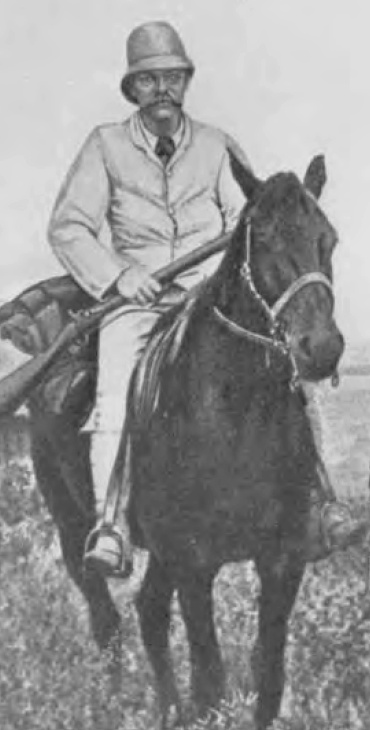
Franz Bachmann in South Africa

Franz Ewald Theodor Bachmann (6 June 1856 – after 1916), was a medical practitioner and naturalist.

Bachmann was born in Lissa, Kingdom of Prussia. He studied in Breslau with Adolf Engler and in Würzburg where he was awarded an M.D. in 1883. He arrived in the Cape on 4 July 1883 in the company of Friedrich Wilms and disembarked while Wilms carried on to Durban. Bachmann spent the next four years practising medicine in the Western Cape, spending two years in Darling and the remainder in Hopefield. In November 1887 he left for Natal aboard the Trojan and stayed for a year in Pondoland where he acted as agent for Berlinsche Pondo Gesellschaft, writing a report on the natural resources there and trying to acquire land for a German agricultural settlement, a venture which was never realised. He wrote an account of his experiences "Reisen, Erlebnisse und Beobachtungen in der Kapkolonie, Natal und Pondoland", published in 1901 in Berlin, but of scant botanical importance. His first trip went from Durban to Pietermaritzburg, across the Ixopo and Umzimkulu Rivers to Clydesdale Mission. His return route crossed the Ibisi River near Harding where he called at the Marburg Mission before getting back to Durban via a boat from Port Shepstone.

His second journey started off on 15 January 1888 when he left on horseback from Marburg Mission with Conrad Beyrich. They went via Flagstaff to Lusikisiki, visiting Qawukeni or Qaukeni, the kraal of the Paramount Chief of the Pondo people. From there they went through to the Egossa Forest and on to Port St Johns. Establishing a camp at the ill-fated Port Grosvenor, he made a short excursion to the Mateku Falls on a tributary of the Umsikaba River. He reached Durban in November 1888 and embarked on a boat calling at Port Elizabeth and Cape Town en route to Berlin where he arrived in January 1889.

Besides flowering plants he collected some fungi, lichens and mosses, and various natural history specimens. Insect collections, mainly Coleoptera made by him in Münster, Breslau and Mähren are conserved in Landesmuseum für Naturkunde Münster and insect collections made in Transvaal are in Museum für Naturkunde in Berlin.

He is commemorated in the genera Bachmannia and Bachmanniomyces, and the species Leonotis bachmannii, Struthiola bachmannii, Kniphofia bachmannii and Bachmannia chubutensis.
