= Wilm =

Wilm is a German language surname. It stems from a reduced form of the male given name Wilhelm – and may refer to:

- Alfred Wilm (1869–1937), German metallurgist
- Clarke Wilm (1976), Canadian former professional ice hockey centre
- Ingrid Wilm (1998), Canadian swimmer

== See also ==
- Wilms
