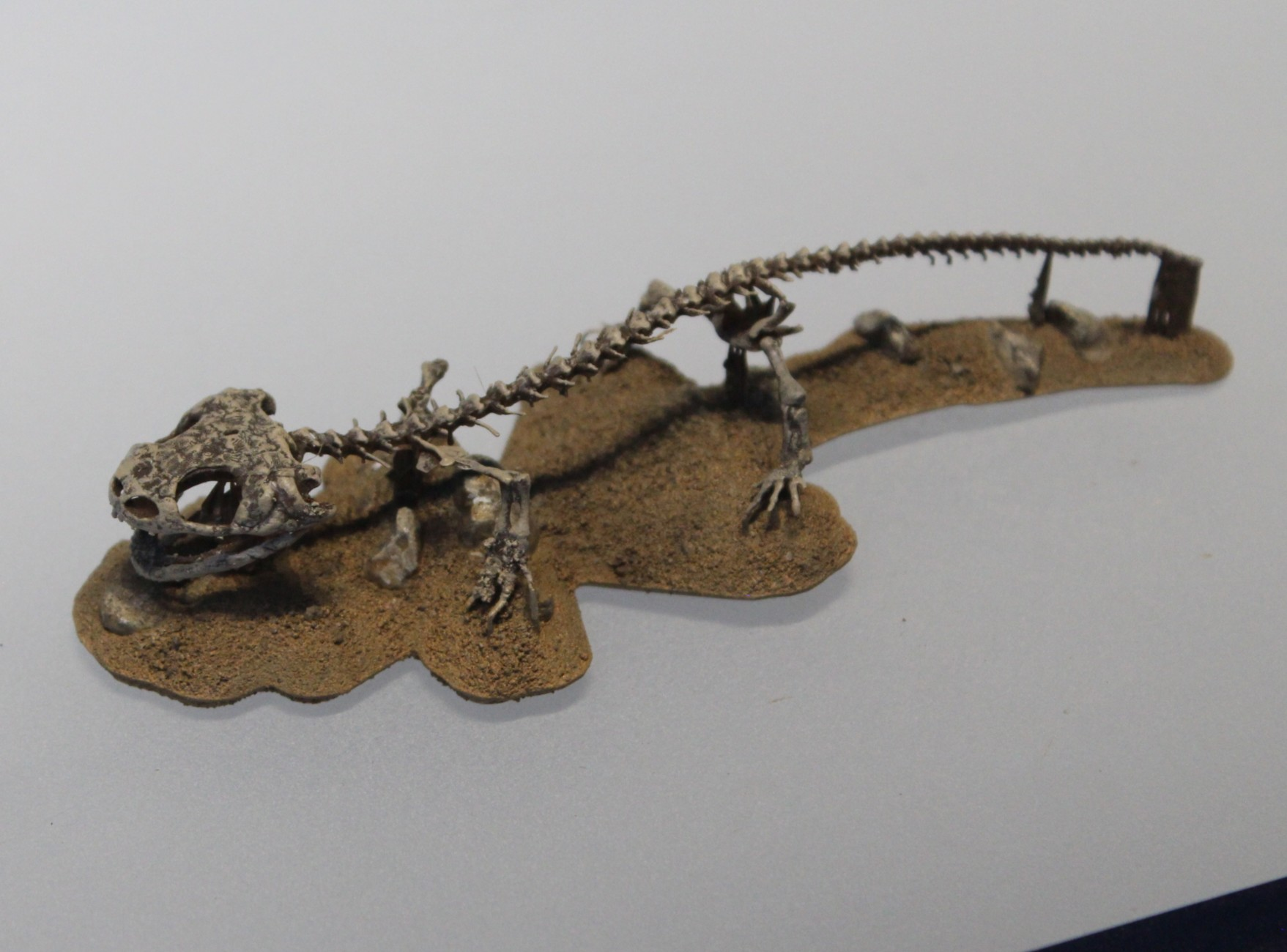
- Reconstructed skeletal mount at the Baoding Natural History Museum

Scientific classification
- Kingdom: Animalia
- Phylum: Chordata
- Clade: Tetrapoda
- Order: †Temnospondyli
- Family: †Branchiosauridae
- Subfamily: †Branchiosaurinae
- Genus: †Apateon von Meyer, 1844

= Apateon =

Apateon Temporal range: Gzhelian–Asselian

Extinct genus of amphibians

Apateon is an extinct genus of temnospondyl amphibian within the family Branchiosauridae.

== Species ==
- †Apateon caducus
- †Apateon dracyi
- †Apateon flagrifer
- †Apateon kontheri
- †Apateon pedestris von Meyer 1840
- †Apateon umbrosus

== Fossil record ==
Fossils of Apateon are found in freshwaters strata of Latest Carboniferous (Gzhelian) to Early Permian (Asselian) of Germany.

== Description ==
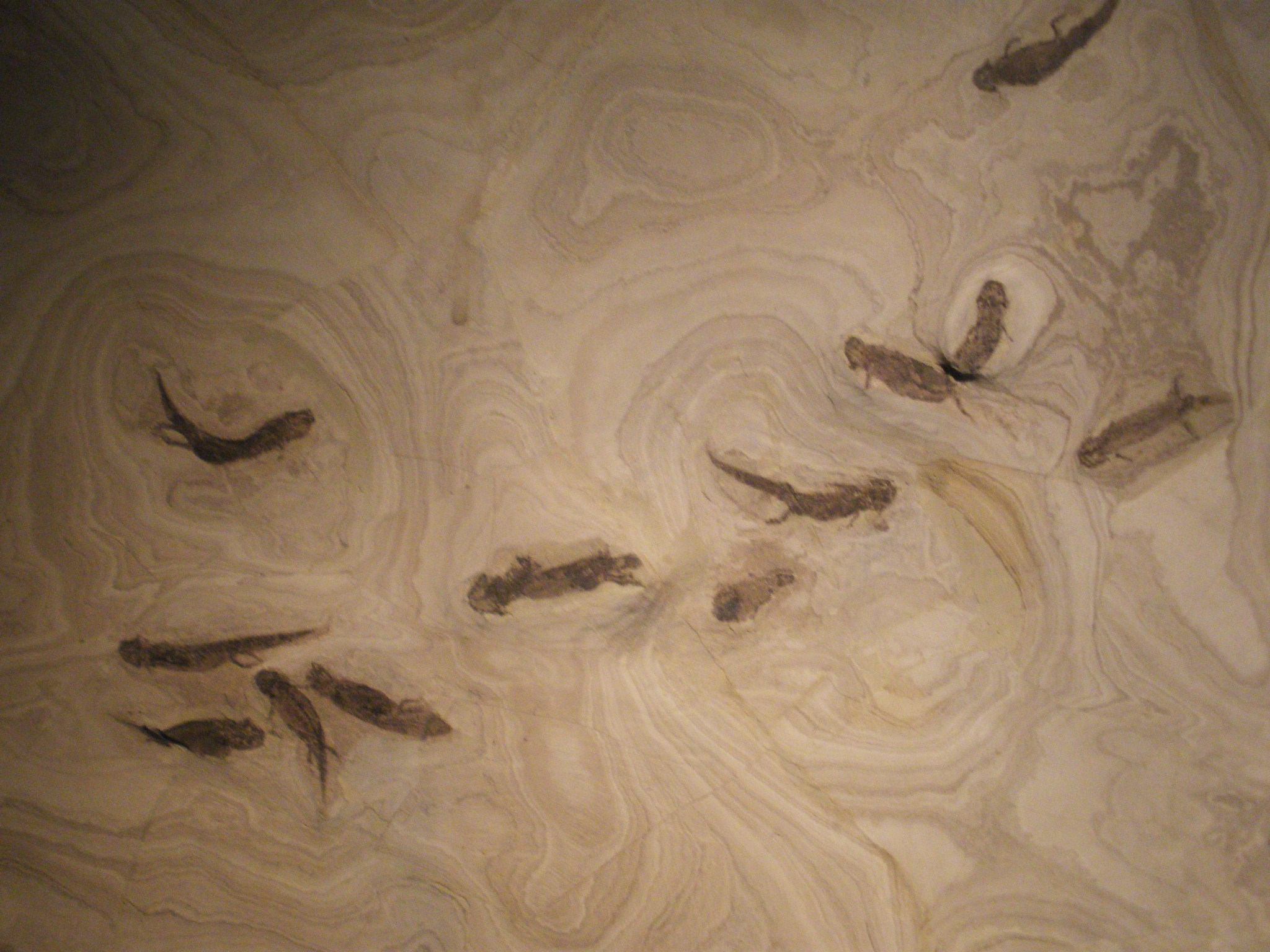
Fossils of A. pedestris in the Naturmuseum Senckenberg

These amphibians could reach a length of about 5–12 centimetres (2.0–4.7 in), while the length of the skull could reach 8–24 millimetres (0.31–0.94 in). They resembled a salamander and had a laterally flattened tail with a long fin. The body was completely covered with rounded scales. The portion of the skull behind the eyes was quite short. On opposite sides of the head there are three pairs of long, spiral-shaped external gills. They had a weakly ossified skeleton and a wide, short skull, with huge eye holes. The teeth were small and peaked. On the hands are present four fingers.

== Palaeobiology ==
=== Life history ===
Like some modern salamanders, Apateon caducus had two different trajectories of life history. One was metamorphosis, which involved ossification of the braincase, palatoquadrate, and intercentra, and the other being neoteny. Apateon were sexually mature in the neotenous state in which adults retained traits seen in the young, such as larval-type sculpting of the dermal portion of the skull roof and ossified branchial denticles. Neotenous Apateon were fully aquatic animals that lived in semi-permanent lakes and ponds, while metamorphosed individuals had the ability to engage in terrestrial locomotion. Metamorphosis was an extremely condensed and rapid process in the life history of Apateon, particularly compared to other temnospondyls. In Phase A, the first phase of metamorphosis, the pterygoid, palatine, and vomer formed in the palate and the premaxilla, maxilla, dentary, and coronoid formed in the jaw. After this phase formed the first dermal bones: the frontal, parietal, and squamosal. This phase of metamorphosis is referred to as Phase B. These would then fuse in the next phase of metamorphosis, Phase C. Successive to the initial ossification of the frontal, parietal, and squamosal bones was the formation of the supratemporal, postparietal, quadratojugal, and nasal, which in turn was followed by the ossification of the supraorbital elements. After this, in Phase D, the limbs and girdles were completed. In Phase E, the dermal bones took on a more polygonal ornamentation. Phase F was the phase of formation of vertebral centra, and it occurred almost simultaneously to Phase E. It was followed by Phase G, the ossification of the exoccipitals and sphenethmoid; the rest of the endocranium remained cartilaginous in Apateon and other branchiosaurids.

== Bibliography ==
- Cyril Walker & David Ward (1993) - Fossielen: Sesam Natuur Handboeken, Bosch & Keuning, Baarn. ISBN 90-246-4924-2
- Gaining Ground: The Origin and Early Evolution of Tetrapods
- Hermann von Meyer, 1844: Briefliche Mittheilung an Prof. Bronn gerichtet. Neues Jahrbuch für Geognosie, Geologie und Petrefakten-Kunde 1844: 329–340.
- Hermann von Meyer, 1848: Apateon pedestris aus der Steinkohlenformation von Münsterappel. – Palaeontographica 1: 153–154.
- Jürgen Boy, 1972: Die Branchiosaurier (Amphibia) des saarpfalzischen Rotliegenden (Perm, SW-Deutschland). Abhandlungen des hessischen Landes-Amtes für Bodenforschung 65: 1–137.
- Jürgen Boy, 1987: Studien uber die Branchiosauridae (Amphibia: Temnospondyli; Ober-Karbon-Unter-Perm) 2. Systematische Übersicht. Neues Jahrbuch für Geologie und Paläontologie, Abhandlungen 174: 75-104.
- Rainer Schoch und Andrew Milner, 2014: Temnospondyli. In: Sues, H.D. (Hrg): Encyclopedia of Paleoherpetology, Band 3A2. Pfeil: München.
- Rainer Schoch, 1992: Comparative ontogeny of Early Permian branchiosaurid amphibians from Southwestern Germany. Developmental stages. Palaeontographica A 222: 43–83.
- Ralf Werneburg, 1991: Die Branchiosaurier aus dem Unterrotliegend des Döhlener Beckens bei Dresden. Veröffentlichungen des Naturhistorischen Museums Schleusingen 6: 75–99.
