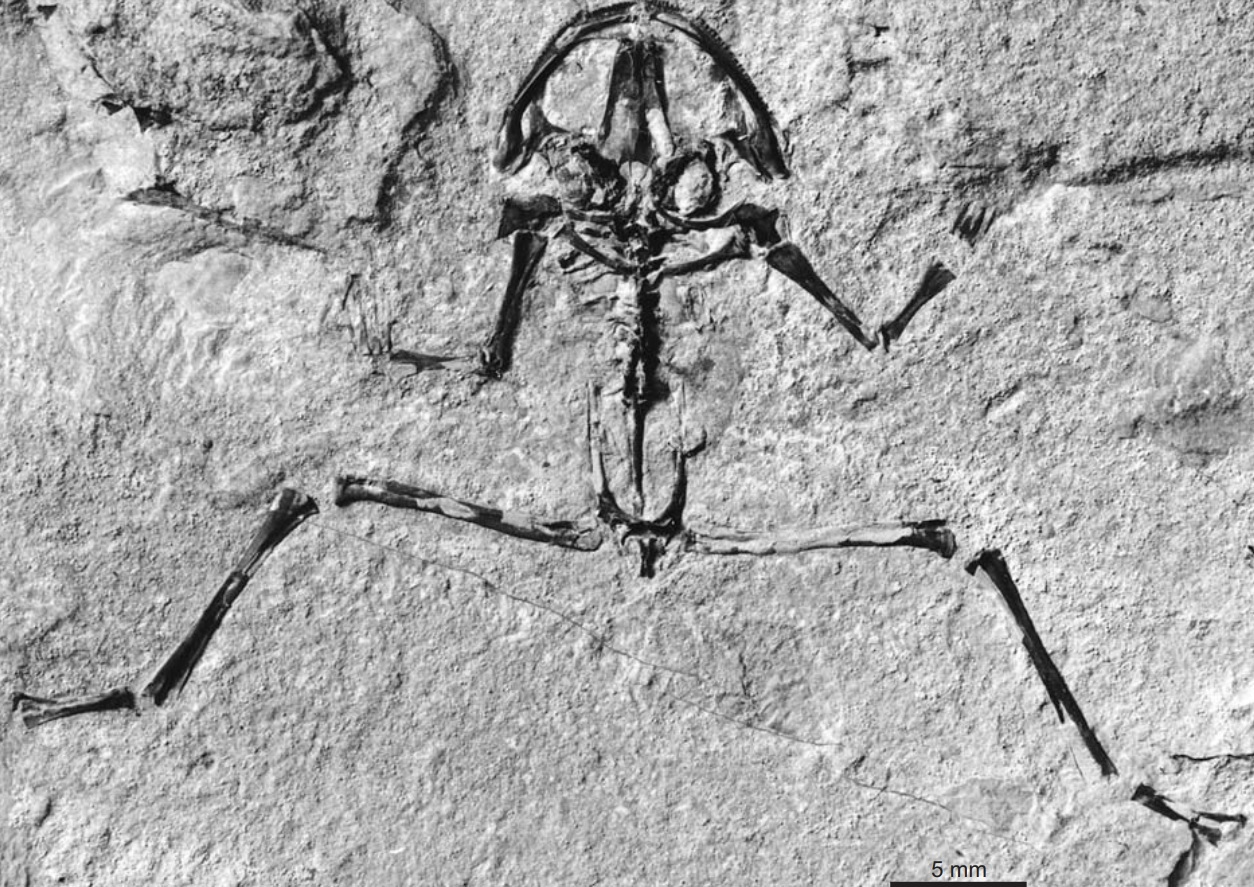
- Fossil in ventral view
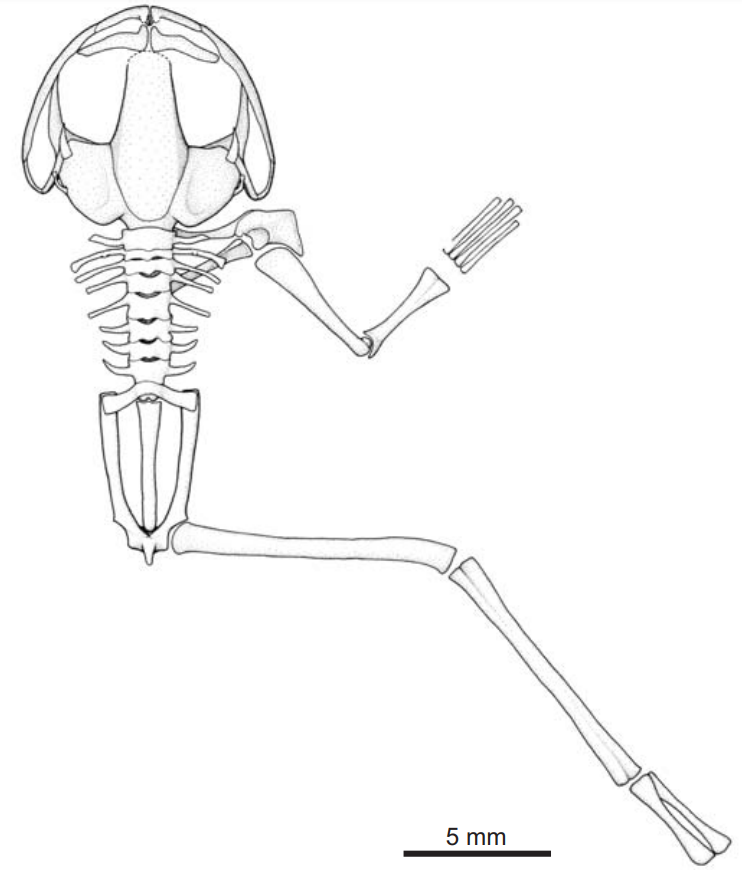
- Restoration in dorsal view

Scientific classification
- Domain: Eukaryota
- Kingdom: Animalia
- Phylum: Chordata
- Class: Amphibia
- Order: Anura
- Clade: Pipimorpha
- Genus: †Neusibatrachus; Seiffert, 1972

Type species
- † Neusibatrachus wilferti Seiffert, 1972

= Neusibatrachus =

Neusibatrachus Temporal range: Early Cretaceous, 145.5–99.6 Ma

Extinct genus of amphibians

Neusibatrachus is an extinct genus of frog, known from the Early Cretaceous (Barremian) La Pedrera de Rúbies Formation of Spain. It is one of the oldest representatives of Pipimorpha.

== See also ==
- Prehistoric amphibian
- List of prehistoric amphibians
