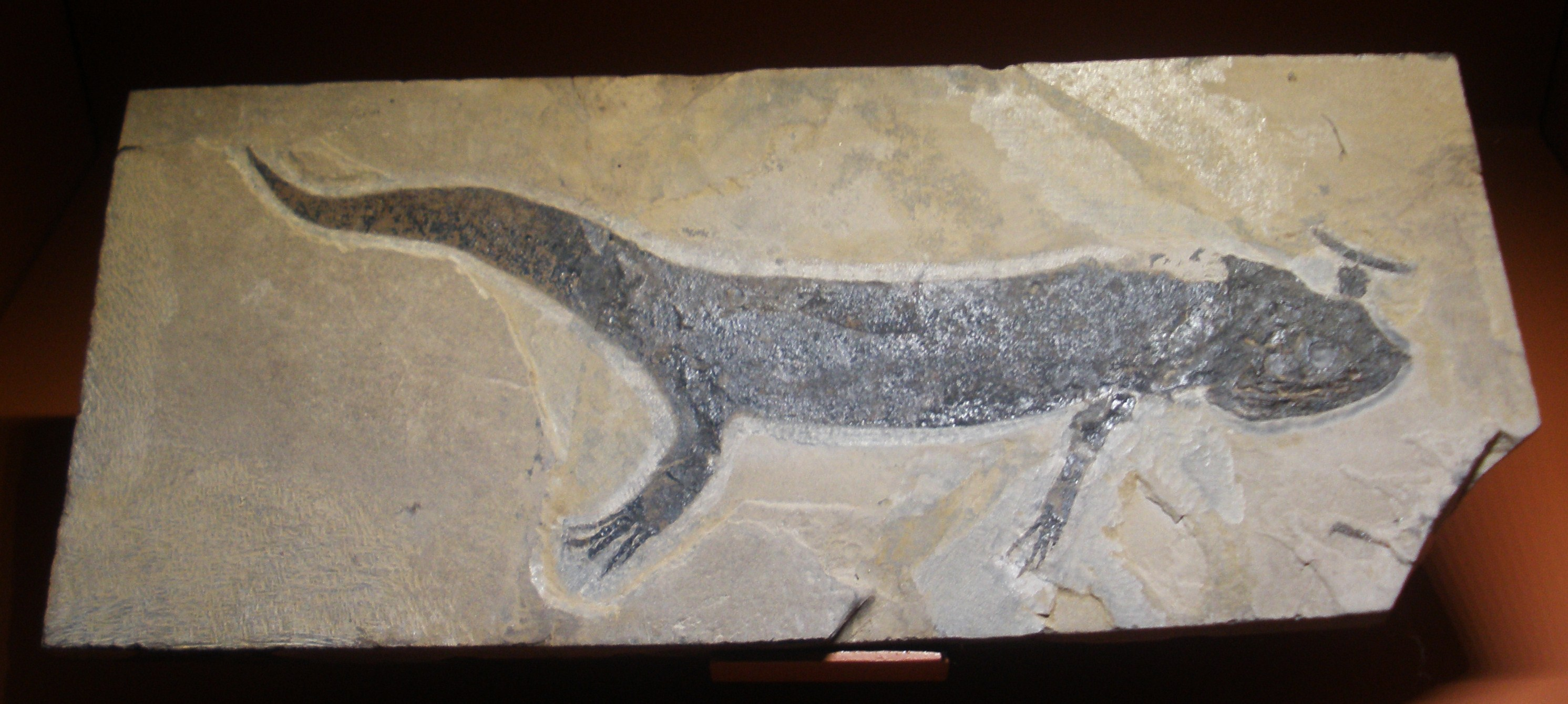
- Fossil of Branchiosaurus salamandroides in the Museo di Storia Naturale di Venezia

Scientific classification
- Domain: Eukaryota
- Kingdom: Animalia
- Phylum: Chordata
- Order: †Temnospondyli
- Clade: †Amphibamiformes
- Family: †Branchiosauridae; Fritsch, 1879.

Genera
- †Branchiosaurinae; †Branchiosaurus; †Apateon; †Melanerpeton; †Leptorophus; †Schoenfelderpeton; †Piasimotriton; †Tungussogyrininae; †Tungussogyrinus

= Branchiosauridae =

Branchiosauridae Temporal range: Pennsylvanian–Wordian

Extinct family of temnospondyls

Branchiosauridae is an extinct family of small amphibamiform temnospondyls with external gills and an overall juvenile appearance. The family has been characterized by hundreds of well-preserved specimens from the Permo-Carboniferous of Middle Europe. Specimens represent well defined ontogenetic stages and thus the taxon has been described to display paedomorphy (perennibranchiate). However, more recent work has revealed branchiosaurid taxa that display metamorphosing trajectories. The name Branchiosauridae (“Branchio” in Ancient Greek denoting gills and “saurus” meaning lizard) refers to the retention of gills.

== Geological/paleoenvironmental information ==
Branchiosaurids mostly inhabited Permo-Carboniferous freshwater mountain-lake habitats of Middle Europe at an altitude of up to 2000 meters. Large quantities of specimens have been collected from the grey shales and limestones of Rotliegend localities of the Variscan orogen. The branchiosaurid fossil record is exceptional due to Lagerstatten conditions of these localities and the preservation of specimens representing various ontogenetic stages. In the Late Carboniferous and Early Permian, western Europe was subjected to annual and long-lasting changes between dry and monsoon periods which produced highly variable lake environments and thus rapid diversification and speciation of amphibian populations. Smaller, shallow lakes especially would have experienced unstable environments due to these changing weather conditions whereas large and deep lakes, which yield most of the Branchiosaurid, specimens would have been more buffered. A fine lamination of C(org)-rich grey to black shales indicates a belt of lakes of tropical to subtropical climate and the existence of variable levels of oxygen for aquatic life in the Late Paleozoic. Permo-Carboniferous mass-mortality events are observed in several basins of Germany possibly caused by episodic mixing of the water column resulting in oxygen deficiency.

Although the absolute ages of certain Rotliegend strata have yet to be elucidated the stratigraphically oldest branchiosaurid belonging to the genus Branchiosaurus occurs in Westphalian D. The earliest occurrence of Melanerpeton-clade is the Stephanian C and the first occurrence of the genus Apateon in Upper Carboniferus. The stratigraphic range of named members of Branchiosauridae extends to the Sakmarian (Early Permian). A partial skeleton is known from the Wordian aged Kaş Formation of Southeastern Turkey, making it the only fossil of the group known from the Guadalupian.

Branchiosaurid gene flow enhanced by periods of wet climate led to successful colonization of roughly 15 basins (known so far). It has been hypothesized that Branchiosaurids originated in the Central Bohemian basin of Czech Republic (WestphalianD), from which they migrated to basins of the Massif Central in France (Stephanian B) and subsequently to several Central German basins including Thuringian Forest, Ilfeld and Saale (Stephanian C).

== Historical information/discovery ==
Branchiosaurids were recognized as a distinct group and given the family name by Fritsch (1879). In 1939 Romer hypothesized that branchiosaurids were, instead, larval morphotypes of larger temnospondyl amphibians. However, Boy (1972) rejected this hypothesis by recognizing autapomorphic larval features of branchiosaurids distinguishing them from other temnospondyls. Boy argued for the neotenic state of Branchiosauridae and distinguished Micromelerpeton, another paedomorphic dissorophoid group, as distinct from Branchiosauridae. He concluded that branchiosaurids form a monophyletic clade closely related to other dissorophoids. Branchiosaurids have since been suggested as close, if not immediate, lissamphibian (extant amphibian) relatives.

== Classification ==
Branchiosaurids form a clade within dissorophoid temnospondyls (one of the hypothesized origins of Lissamphibia). Dissorophoidea encompasses Micromelerpetidae and Xerodromes (all other taxa). Xerodromes includes the Olsoniformes and salamander-like Amphibamiformes. The latter includes four clades: Micropholidae, Amphibamidae, Branchiosauridae and Lissamphibia. The amphibamids Amphibamus and Platyrhinops are the closest relatives of branchiosaurids and despite sharing homoplasies with amphibamids, Branchiosauridae forms a monophyletic group.

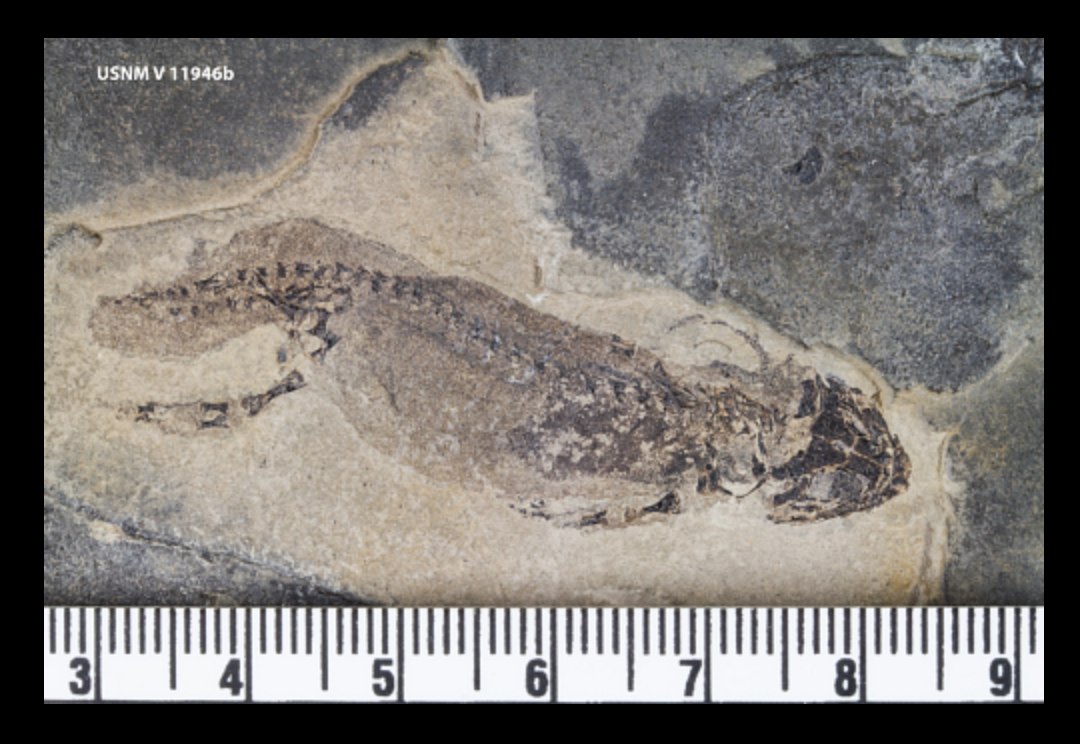
Branchiosaurus amblystomus Credner

== Family description ==
The synapomorphies of Branchiosauridae include a palatine with a prominent process which extends from the center of the bone to contact the maxilla; six rows of isolated, slender and multi-ended branchials; 21-22 presacral vertebrae (reversed in some forms).

One skeleton of the branchiosaurid Melanerpton tenerum has been discovered with preserved skin pattern. The preservation shows a regular pattern of bright spots blurred by dark pigments on the dorsal skin. This is the first record of this mosaic-type pattern in an extinct amphibian.

== Genera descriptions ==
The family Branchiosauridae includes the genera Branchiosaurus, Apateon, Melanerpeton, Leptorophus and Schoenfelderpeton.

The stratigraphically oldest genus is Branchiosaurus, with its only well-known species being B. salamandroides, and forms the most basal node of Branchiosauridae. The post-Branchiosaurus branchiosaurids fall into either the Melanerpeton-clade or the Apateon clade. Within the morphogenically more diverse Melanerpeton-clade, the genera Schoenfelderpeton and Leptorophus are sister groups. Within the Apateon-clade, A. kontheri forms the basal-most taxon followed by A. gracilis, A. pedestris, A. dracyiensis and the sister-taxa A. caducus and A. flagrifer.

The genus Branchiosaurus is plesiomorphic with no autapomorphies. Branchiosaurus retains the prefrontal-postfrontal contact, the anteriorly extended jugal and ventral osteoderms. In the post-Branchiosaurus clade the prefrontal-postfrontal contact is lost (although reversed in A. dracyiensis), the maxilla sutures with quadratojugal in late development, the jugal is anteriorly shortened and ventral ossified osteoderms are lost. The diagnostic features of the genus Apateon are tabular horns separated from the skull table by a groove; tooth-bearing region of maxilla is broad and the dorsal osteoderms are smooth or with radiating striations. The diagnostic features of the Melanerpeton group are the palatine, the ectopterygoid and palatine ramus of pterygoid are extremely delicate, poorly ossified and have few or no denticles. The Melanerpeton genus has no autapomorphies and is paraphyletic with respect to the Leptorophus-Schoenfelderpeton group. The Leptorophus-Schoenfelderpeton group is characterized by a postorbital separated from supratemporal, a carotid foramina and grooves situated on sides of the cultriform process. The diagnostic features of the genus Leptorophus are a long triangular skull, anterior parts of nasal and vomer elongated, a very close prefrontal and postfrontal, elongated narial openings, a maxilla extended posteriorly, quadrate condyles posterior to occipital condyles, and a vomer with long posteromedial process. The autopamorphic features of the genus Schoenfelderpeton are an overall broad skull with an enlarged otic notch, a wider posterior skull table, supratemporal anteriorly pointed, possible subdivided postfrontal, very short humerus, represented only by midshaft ossification. These diagnostics of Schoenfelderpeton indicated it is the most neotenic of the branchiosaurids.

There are several potential branchiosaurids that are as of yet too inadequately characterized to classify. However, in recent work one such species, Tungussogyriinus bergi has been further analyzed and shown to share clear synapomorphies with branchiosaurids including the Y-shaped palatine resulting in a gap between ectopterygoid and maxilla as well as brush-like branchial denticles. T. bergi differs from all other branchiosaurids in two autapomorphies: elongated process of ilium and tricuspid dentition. Thus, Tungussgyrinus is thought to represent a clade that is the closest relative to all other branchiosaurids and two new subfamilies, Tungussogyrininae and Branchiosaurinae fall under Branchiosauridae.

== Paleobiology ==
The specialized pharyngeal denticles with brush-like branches of Branchiosauridae are indicative of gill clefts and suggest a filter-feeding mechanism focusing on plankton. In well preserved specimens of Branchiosaurus, six rows of tooth-bearing ossicles are present on each side of the hyobranchial skeleton in a 1-2-2-1 configuration. This is consistent with the denticles being attached to the epithelium surrounding four cartilaginous ceratobranchials bordering three external gill-slits. The jaw-like apparatus may have served to hold back prey items leaving the pharyngeal cavity with the water current or to form a tight closure of gill cleft during feeding.

Branchiosauridae diversified partly through adaptations that included the co-evolution of delayed development of the upper jaw and cheek which resulted in a kinetic maxilla and allowed for more efficient suction feeding. This mechanism would have been adaptive for suspension feeding and feeding on single prey. In the Apateon-clade different morphotypes evolved due to heterochronic changes. In some species (A. caducus and A. flagrifer), the maxilla consolidated early in development and the gape size and irregular dentition indicate an early transition in diet from suspension to carnivory. In other species (A. dracyiensis) the maxilla was never consolidated indicating a reinforced suction mechanism. Diagnostics of the Melanerpeton-clade indicate a combination of filter-feeding and occasional capture of larger prey.

Although the Melanerpeton-Apateon dichotomy is not correlated with any significant adaptations, the Melanerpeton-clade generally had a larger body size which likely allowed them to occupy new niches in lake ecosystems. Most Apateon species did not appear to have competitors and thus were successful invaders.

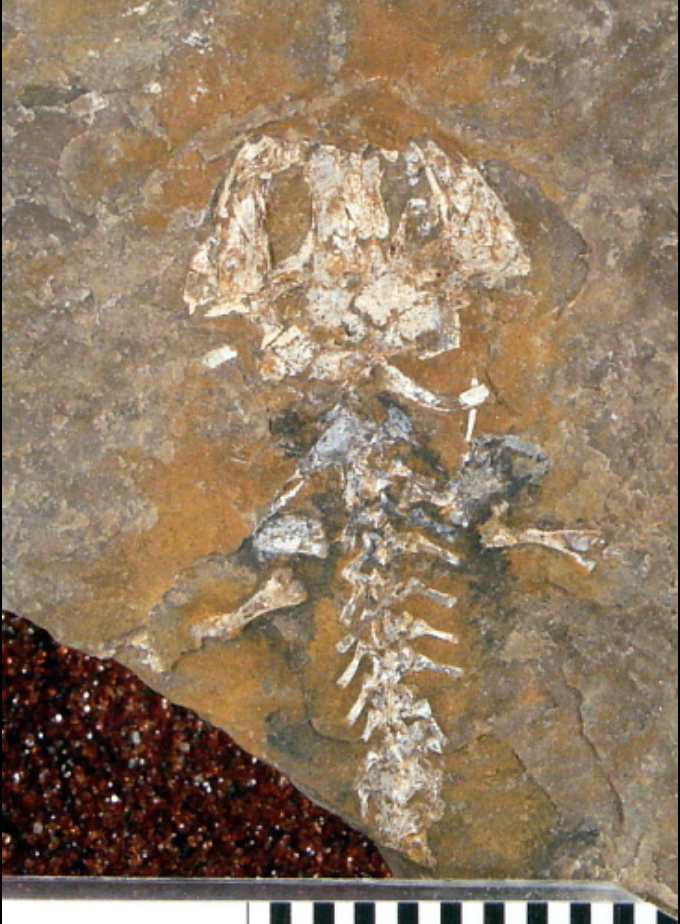
Branchiosaurus gracilis Credner - Smithsonian Institution

== Ontogeny ==
Both neoteny (retention of larval somatic features into adulthood) and metamorphosis have been reported ontogenic pathways in branchiosaurids. Certain terrestrial branchiosaurid adaptations, such as the short trunk and long limbs, suggest that it was an initially terrestrial clade and thus reversals to aquatic life and metamorphosing trajectories occurred within the clade. The metamorphosis trajectory into terrestrial adults has been reported only in A. gracilis. Changes that distinguish the adult A. gracilis from its larval counterpart occurred during a rapid phase of development and include ossification of the braincase, palatoquadrate, intercentra and girdles, muscle attachment scars, and polygonal ridges and grooves decorating the dermal skull roof. The larval somatic features including ossified branchial denticles and larval-type sculpturing of the skull roof are lost. Postcranial features of transformed A. gracilis indicate that it was terrestrial and biting force had become a more important factor than suction. Despite this instance of metamorphosis, neoteny is nearly ubiquitous throughout branchiosaurids and most species remained in an aquatic environment throughout their life (however we should not rule out the possibility that this is a relic of terrestrial metamorphosed specimens not being well preserved). Neoteny is one of the major modes of heterochrony in which there is a modification in the timing or rate of development of certain features that is inherited. Neotenic branchiosaurids experienced isometric growth of cranial bones while retaining juvenile features noted above. Adult branchiosaurid neotenes are distinguished from larval neotenes by accentuated larval-type skull roof ornamentation, increased ossification (although not as extensively as in metamorphosed specimens), and development of uncinate process on the anterior trunk ribs. Such phenotypic plasticity in the form of facultative neoteny has been reported in modern lissamphibians and has been suggested to also be highly advantageous in the high altitude habitats of branchiosaurids where the harsh, continually changing conditions would have made aquatic life favorable.

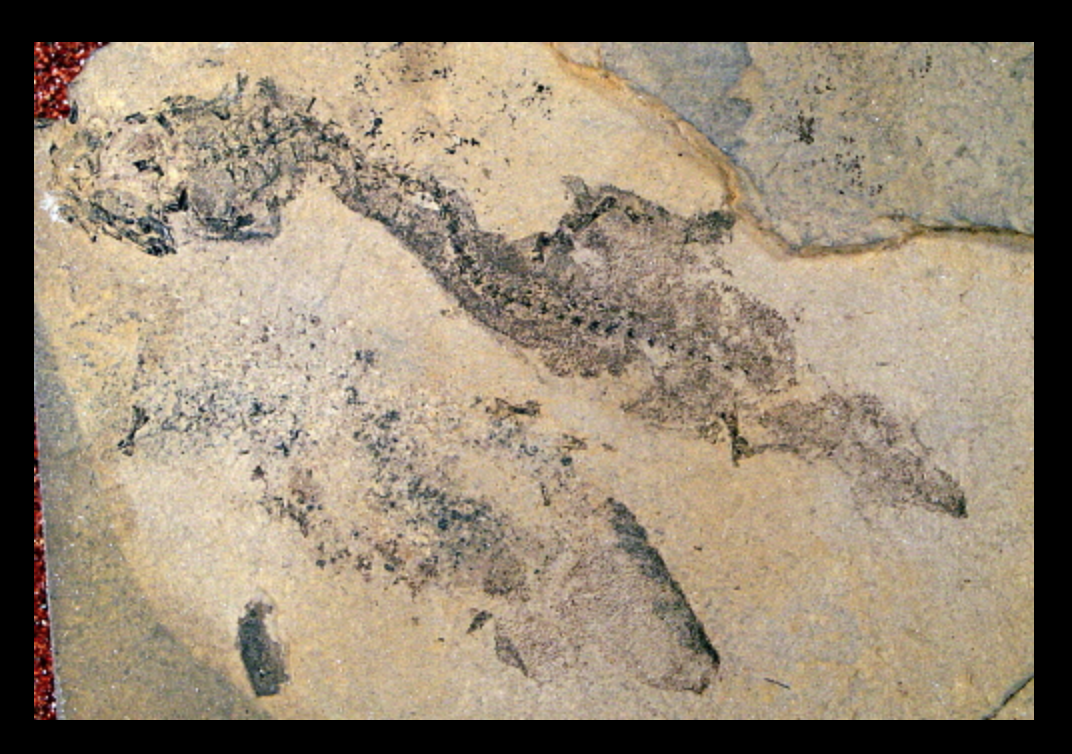
Apateon gracilis skeleton on slab

== Histology ==
Histological observations confirm anatomical evidence of neoteny in branchiosaurids. Skeletochronological analysis allows for the identification of sexual maturity (i.e. when the distance between lines of arrested growth (LAGs) suddenly decreases). In Apateon specimens determined to be sexually mature, the cartilaginous Katschenko's line can be observed when perichondral ossification is complete. The diaphyseal and epiphyseal ossification patterns of Apateon specimens (i.e. persistence of histological larval features into adulthood) are suggestive of paedomorphy and similar to those of urodeles (extant neotenic amphibians).
