= Wilms =

Wilms is a surname. Notable people with the surname include:

- André Wilms (1947–2022), French actor
- Dorothee Wilms (born 1929), German politician
- Friedrich Wilms (1848–1919), German botanist
- Johann Wilhelm Wilms (1772–1847), Dutch-German composer
- Max Wilms (1867–1918), German pathologist and surgeon
  - Wilms' tumor, a rare tumor, most common in children, named after Max Wilms
