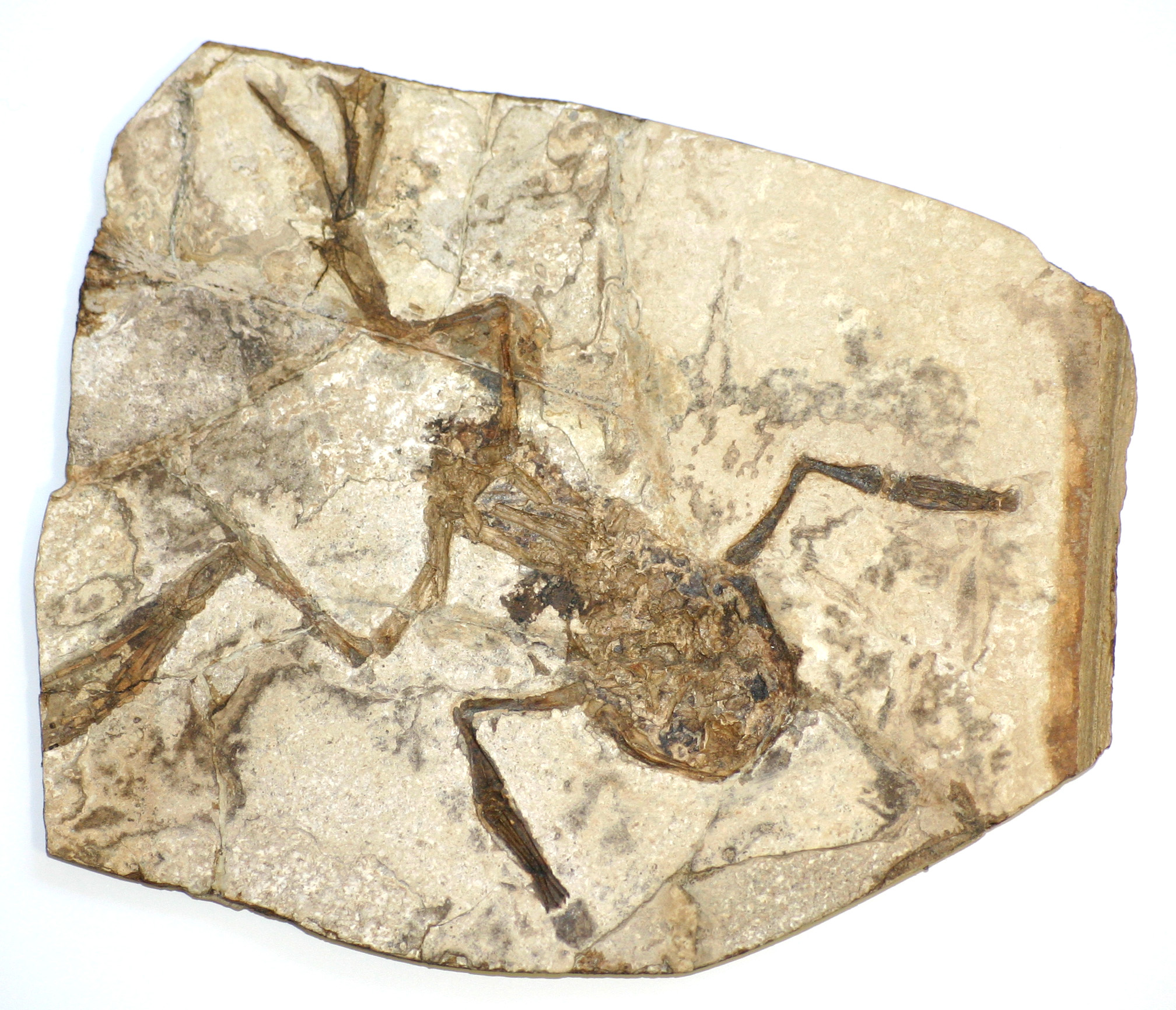
- Palaeobatrachus gigas from Czech Republic

Scientific classification
- Kingdom: Animalia
- Phylum: Chordata
- Class: Amphibia
- Order: Anura
- Clade: Pipoidea
- Clade: Pipimorpha
- Family: †Palaeobatrachidae; Cope, 1865

Genera
- †Albionbatrachus †Palaeobatrachus

= Palaeobatrachidae =

Palaeobatrachidae Temporal range: Campanian–Middle Pleistocene

Extinct family of amphibians

Palaeobatrachidae is an extinct family of frogs known from the Late Cretaceous to the Pleistocene primarily of Europe. They were highly adapted to aquatic life, like other members of the Pipimorpha. The oldest undoubted records of the family are from the lower Campanian (83.6–77.9 million years ago) of France. By far the most abundant genus is Palaeobatrachus, known from the Eocene to Pleistocene of Europe, with most other named genera in the family synonymised with it, the only exception being Albionbatrachus, which is distinguished from Palaeobatrachus by characters of its frontoparietals. The youngest fossils of Palaeobatrachus date to around 500,000 years ago, during the Middle Pleistocene after which they likely became extinct due to increasing aridity and freezing temperatures during the ice ages. Fossils of indeterminate palaeobatrachids are also known from the Pliocene and Early Pleistocene of Western Siberia.
