= Rhadinosteus =

Rhadinosteus Temporal range: Kimmeridgian, 150.8–155.7 Ma

Scientific classification
- Domain: Eukaryota
- Kingdom: Animalia
- Phylum: Chordata
- Class: Amphibia
- Order: Anura
- Clade: Pipoidea
- Genus: †Rhadinosteus; Henrici, 1998
- Species: †R. parvus

Binomial name
- †Rhadinosteus parvus Henrici, 1998

Extinct genus of frogs

Rhadinosteus parvus (meaning "long slender bone") is an extinct species of frogs that lived during the Late Jurassic. Fossils of the species were found at the Rainbow Park site in Utah's Dinosaur National Monument, from several slabs of rock which contain multiple partial specimens, from sediments belonging to the Morrison Formation. R. parvus was likely a member of Pipoidea and may have been a member of the family Rhinophrynidae.

== Description ==
Rhadinosteus parvus was a moderately sized frog, 42mm in length. Unlike the other members of Pipoidea its skeleton is not specialized for any specific task (such as aquatic life in Pipimorpha species).

== See also ==
- List of prehistoric amphibians
- Paleobiota of the Morrison Formation
