= Eorhinophrynus =

Eorhinophrynus Temporal range: Paleocene–Eocene, 61.7–46.2 Ma

Scientific classification
- Kingdom: Animalia
- Phylum: Chordata
- Class: Amphibia
- Order: Anura
- Family: Rhinophrynidae
- Genus: †Eorhinophrynus; Hecht, 1959

Type species
- Eorhinophrynus septentrionalis Hecht, 1959

Extinct genus of frogs

Eorhinophrynus is an extinct genus of frogs from Wyoming.

== See also ==
- List of prehistoric amphibians
