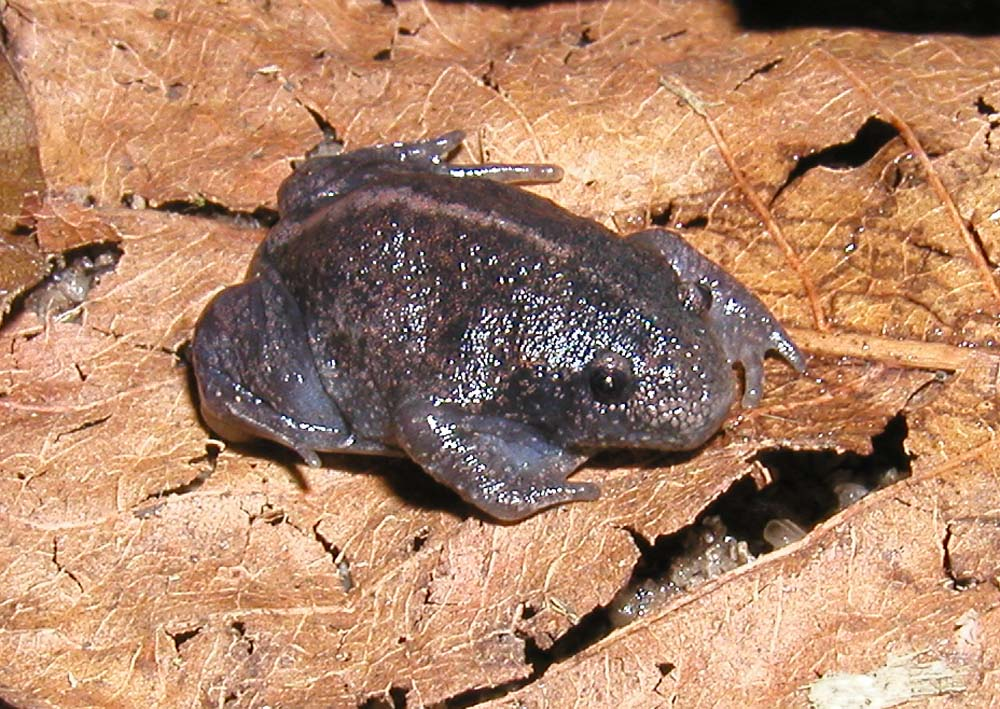
- Juvenile Rhinophrynus dorsalis

Scientific classification
- Domain: Eukaryota
- Kingdom: Animalia
- Phylum: Chordata
- Class: Amphibia
- Order: Anura
- Clade: Pipoidea
- Family: Rhinophrynidae; Günther, 1859

Type genus
- Rhinophrynus Duméril and Bibron, 1841

= Rhinophrynidae =

Rhinophrynidae Temporal range: Late Jurassic to present, 155.7–0 Ma

Family of amphibians

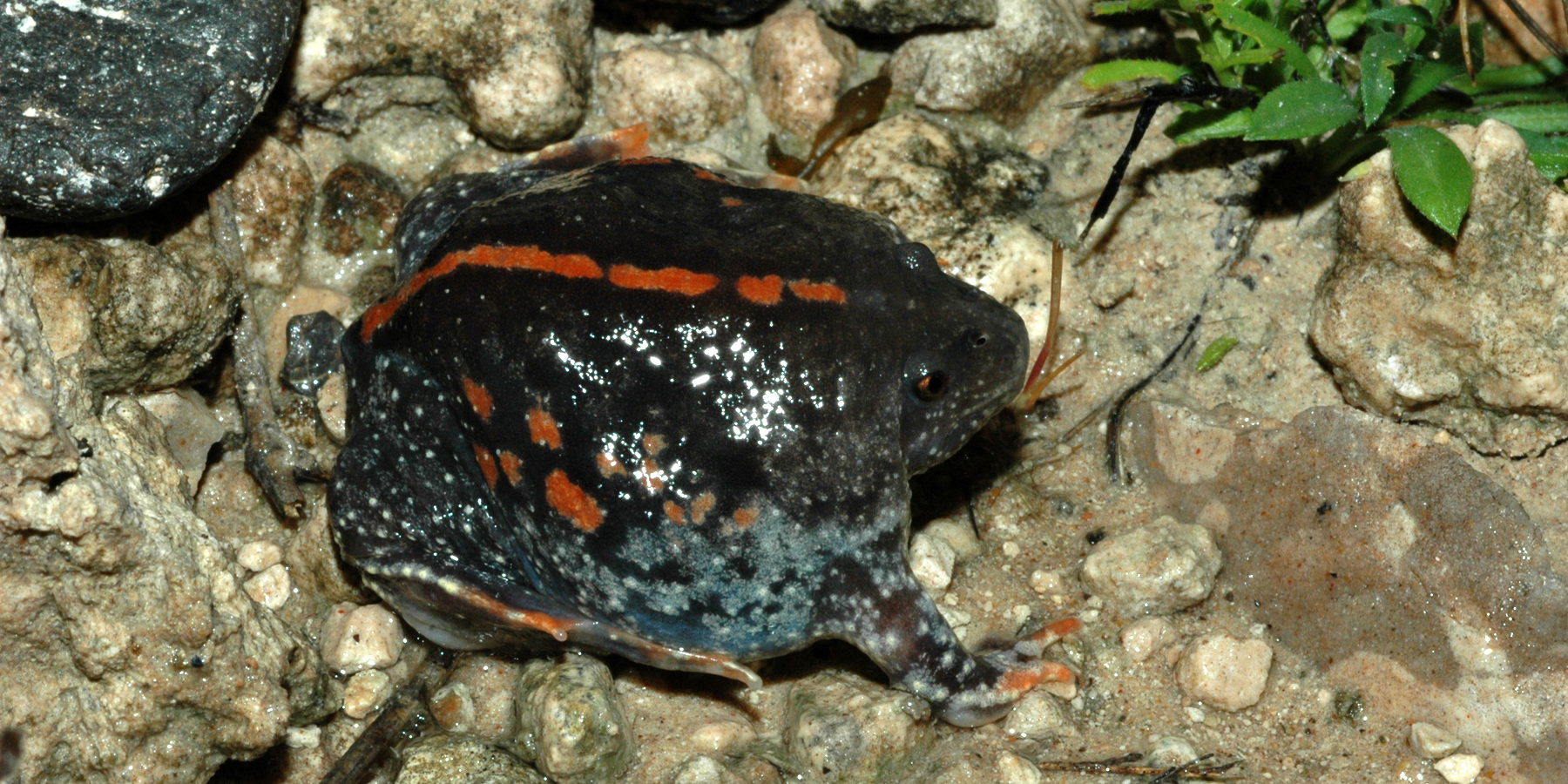
Burrowing Toad (Rhinophrynus dorsalis), Municipality of Reynosa, Tamaulipas, Mexico (8 October 2007).

The Rhinophrynidae are a family of frogs containing one extant genus, the monotypic Rhinophrynus, and a number of fossil genera. The family is sometimes known as the Mexican burrowing toads or simply burrowing toads.

Rhinophrynus occurs in the Central America north from Costa Rica to Mexico and Texas. Fossil finds of Rhinophrynidae come from Mexico, the United States, and Canada. Rhinophrynus is a burrowing ant and termite eater.

== Systematics ==
The Rhinophrynidae are the sister taxon of the Pipidae. The clade formed by these two genera is sometimes referred to as Xenoanura or superfamily Pipoidea.

== Genera ==
Extant genera:

- Rhinophrynus or Mexican burrowing toad Late Eocene-Recent

Fossil genera:

- †Chelomophrynus Henrici 1991 Wagon Bed Formation, Wyoming United States, Eocene
- †Eorhinophrynus Hecht 1959 Polecat Bench Formation, Wyoming, United States, Paleocene
- †Rhadinosteus Henrici 1998 Morrison Formation, Utah, United States, Late Jurassic

The affinity of Eorhinophrynus is uncertain.
