= Laguna del Hunco Formation =

Geological formation in Argentina

- Stratigraphic range: Ypresian (Itaboraian); ~52.44–52 Ma
- Type: Geological formation
- Unit of: Middle Chubut River Volcanic Pyroclastic Complex
- Underlies: Sarmiento Group
- Overlies: Barda Colorada Ignimbrite
- Thickness: 170 m (560 ft)

Lithology
- Primary: Tuff, mudstone, sandstone

Location
- Coordinates: 42.3°S 70.0°W
- Approximate paleocoordinates: 44.8°S 60.0°W
- Region: Chubut Province
- Country: Argentina
- Extent: Cañadón Asfalto Basin

Type section
- Named for: Laguna del Hunco
- Named by: Aragón & Mazzoni
- Location: Languiñeo Department
- Year defined: 1997
- Coordinates: 42.3°S 70.0°W
- Approximate paleocoordinates: 44.8°N 60.0°W
- Region: Chubut Province
- Country: Argentina
- Thickness at type section: 170 m (560 ft)
- Laguna del Hunco Formation (Argentina)

The Laguna del Hunco Formation or Laguna del Hunco Tuff (Spanish: Formación Laguna del Hunco, Tufolitas Laguna del Hunco) is a localized Early Eocene (Itaboraian in the SALMA classification) fossiliferous geological formation of the Cañadón Asfalto Basin in central Patagonia, Argentina. The 170 metres (560 ft) thick formation comprises tuffaceous mudstones and sandstones deposited in a crater lake environment and crops out at Laguna del Hunco in the northwestern Chubut Province.

The formation has been precisely dated to 52.22 ± 0.22 Ma on the basis of sanidine crystals in the tuffs of the formation. The Laguna del Hunco formation overlies the Barda Colorada Ignimbrite and is covered by the Sarmiento Group. The unit is renowned for the preservation of an extraordinarily rich fossil flora assemblage of mixed South American families and presently uniquely Australasian flora, among which the oldest Eucalyptus fossils found worldwide. The formation also has provided many fossil insects, including insect eggs, fossil fish of Bachmannia chubutensis and the frog Shelania pascuali. Periodic bursts of gas in the volcanic crater lake are thought to have produced the sudden death and preservation of the floral and faunal assemblage.

== Description ==
The Laguna del Hunco Formation, named after Laguna del Hunco ("Lake of Reeds"), a desert pond in Chubut Province, is a localized sedimentary unit comprising tuffaceous sandstones and mudstones with primary and reworked ashfall layers. The formation was deposited in a crater lake environment. The approximately 170 metres (560 ft) thick formation forms part of the Middle Chubut River Volcanic Pyroclastic Complex of the western Cañadón Asfalto Basin. This complex comprises a variety of volcaniclastic, intrusive, pyroclastic, and extrusive rocks, deposited over several million years. The complex is characterized by a great variety of volcanogenic bodies, such as ignimbrites, domes, lava flows, necks, intrusives, tuffs, and volcaniclastic deposits (of predominantly lacustrine origin), all of them frequently interbedded.

The Laguna del Hunco Formation was formerly included in the Huitrera Formation, overlies the Barda Colorada Ignimbrite, and is overlain by the Sarmiento Group. The formation has been dated using ^{40}Ar/^{39}Ar analysis on sanidine crystals of the ash beds to 52.22 ± 0.22 Ma, placing the deposits in the Early Eocene, or Itaboraian in the SALMA classification.

== Paleontological significance ==
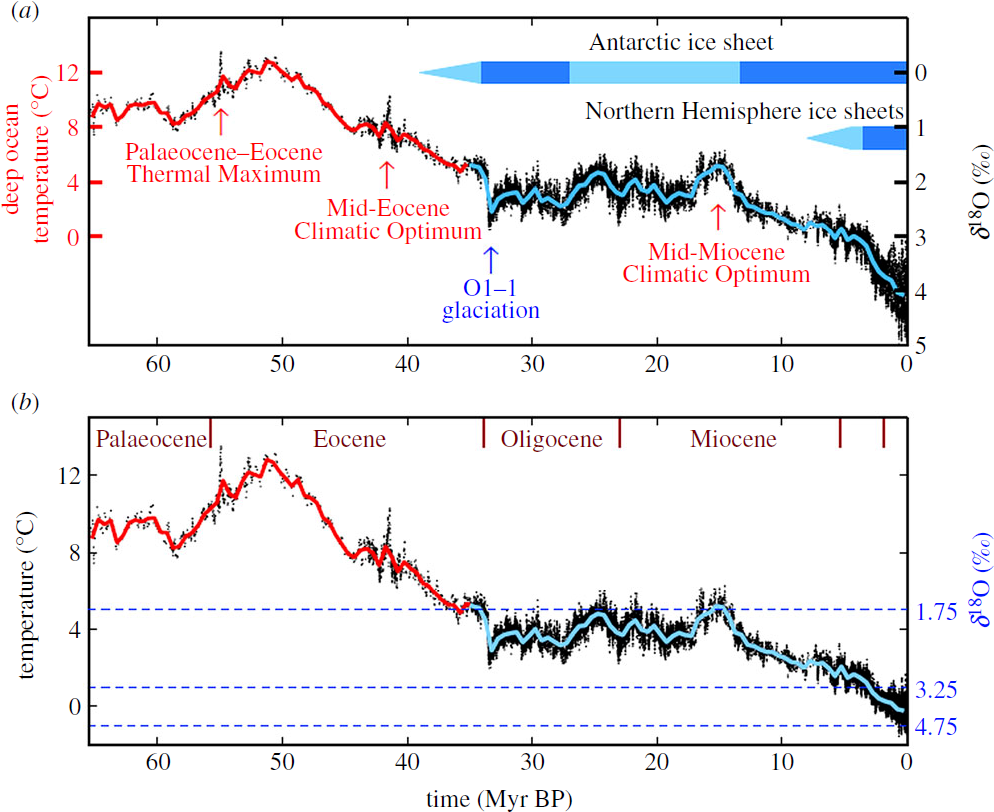
The Laguna del Hunco Formation was deposited during the Early Eocene Climatic Optimum

The paleoflora of the formation is considered one of the most biodiverse Cenozoic fossil deposits worldwide. The biota is composed of extraordinarily rich assemblages of ferns, conifers, and flowering plants, many of which have not yet been formally described. The flora of the formation, studied since the 1920s, was formerly thought to be Miocene in age.

Three described species in the genus Gymnostoma of the family Casuarinaceae, and the species Ceratopetalum edgardoromeroi of the family Cunoniaceae are the only members of these families found outside of Australasia. The floral assemblage is thought to represent a lakeshore vegetation, deposited during the Early Eocene Climatic Optimum (EECO), with estimated average yearly temperatures of 17.2 ± 2.3 °C (63.0 ± 4.1 °F) and annual rainfall of 1,673 ± 426 millimetres (65.9 ± 16.8 in). Periodic gas bursts in the crater lake of Laguna del Hunco probably led to the sudden deaths of the flora and fauna found in the formation.

=== Paleobiota ===
The following fossil plants and animals have been described from the formation:

Group	Group	Species	Images	references
Vertebrates	Aves	Ueekenkcoracias tambussiae		2021
Vertebrates	Amphibia	Shelania pascuali		
Vertebrates	Actinopterygii	Bachmannia chubutensis		
Invertebrates	Insects	Austropanorpodes gennaken		
Invertebrates	Insects	Austroperilestes hunco		
Invertebrates	Insects	Chinchekoala qunita		
Invertebrates	Insects	Frenguellia iglesiasi		
Invertebrates	Insects	Frenguellia patagonica		
Invertebrates	Insects	Huncoaeshna corrugata		
Invertebrates	Insects	Satelitala soberana		
Invertebrates	Insects	Urocerus patagonicus		
Invertebrates	Ichnofossils	Paleoovoidus arcuatum		
Invertebrates	Ichnofossils	Paleoovoidus bifurcatus		
Invertebrates	Ichnofossils	Paleoovoidus rectus		
Flora	Araucariaceae	Araucaria pichileufensis		
Flora	Cycads	Austrozamia stockeyi		
Flora	Cunoniaceae	Ceratopetalum edgardoromeroi		
Flora	Escalloniaceae	Escallonia		
Flora	Myrtaceae	Eucalyptus		
Flora	Ginkgoaceae	Ginkgo patagonica		
Flora	Casuarinaceae	Gymnostoma archangelskyi		
Flora	Casuarinaceae	Gymnostoma argentinum		
Flora	Casuarinaceae	Gymnostoma patagonicum		
Flora	Proteaceae	Lomatia occidentalis		
Flora	Proteaceae	Lomatia preferruginea		
Flora	Osmundaceae	Todea amissa		
Flora	Podocarpaceae	Podocarpus andiniformis		
Flora	Ripogonaceae	Ripogonum americanum		
Flora	Solanaceae	Physalis infinemundi	Physalis infinemundi	
Flora	Malvaceae	Uiher karuen		
