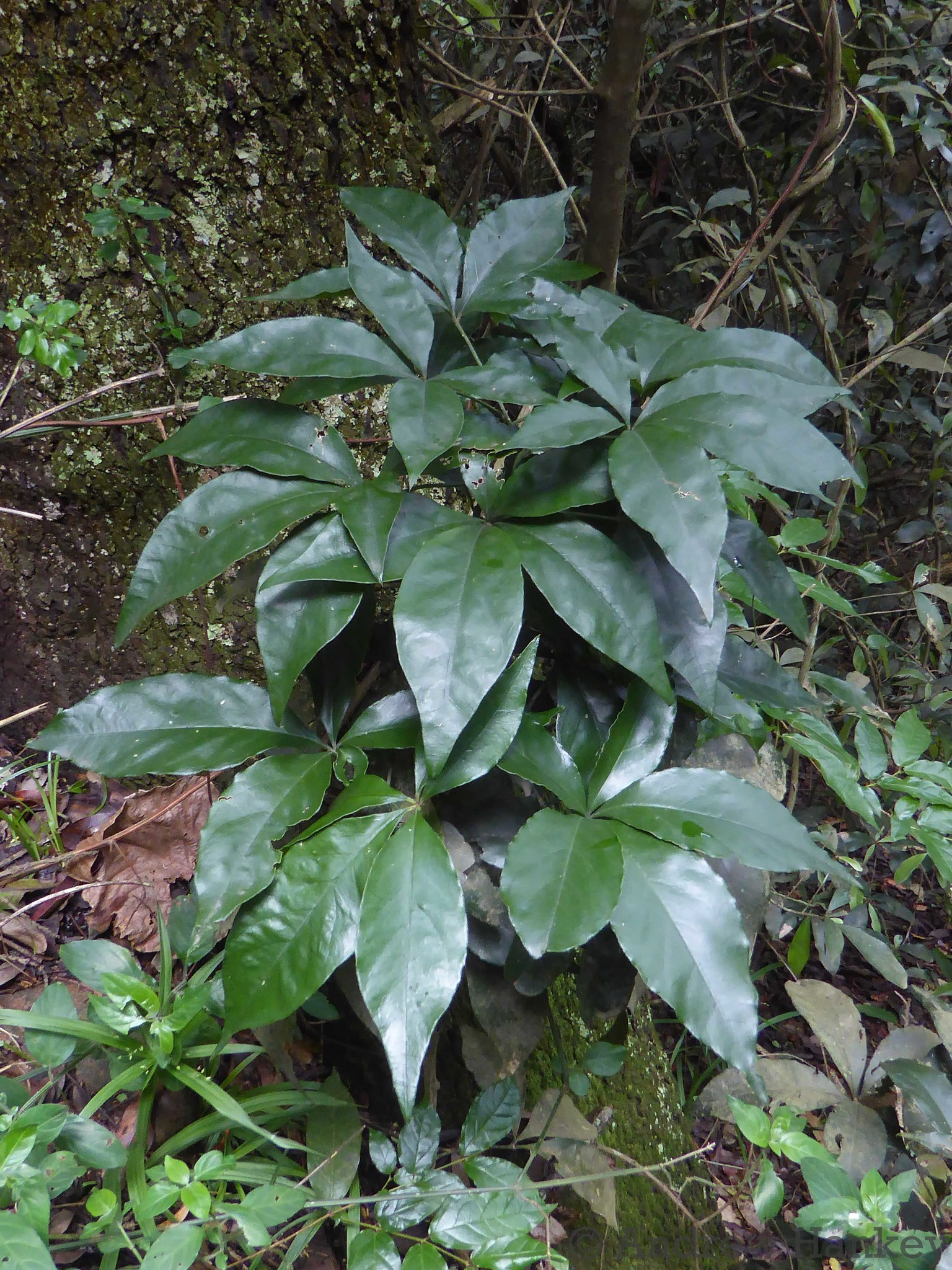

Scientific classification
- Kingdom: Plantae
- Clade: Tracheophytes
- Clade: Angiosperms
- Clade: Eudicots
- Clade: Rosids
- Order: Brassicales
- Family: Capparaceae
- Genus: Bachmannia; Pax (1897)
- Species: B. woodii

Binomial name
- Bachmannia woodii (Oliv.) Gilg (1904)

Synonyms
- Species synonymy: Bachmannia major Pax (1897), nom. nud.; Bachmannia minor Pax (1897), nom. nud.; Maerua woodii (Oliv.) T.Durand & Schinz (1898); Niebuhria woodii Oliv. (1882)

= Bachmannia woodii =

Genus of plants

Bachmannia is a monotypic genus of flowering plant in the family Capparaceae with the sole member being Bachmannia woodii, (Xhosa: Umtswantswantsa) the four-finger bush. It is native to southeastern Africa.

== Etymology ==
The taxon name "Bachmannia" is named after Dr Frans Ewald Bachmann, a German naturalist and medical practitioner.

== Description ==
This plant is a small, shrub-like tree that can grow to reach between 1.5–3 m (4 ft 11 in – 9 ft 10 in) tall. It has a light brown bark.

The flowers are pink and bell-shaped.

== Distribution ==
This plant can be found in southern Mozambique, EmaMpondweni and the KwaZulu-Natal region. This species is located in coastal forests, usually occurring on sandstone. It prefers to live at lower elevations.
