= Bachmannia chubutensis =

Bachmannia chubutensis Temporal range: Ypresian, 52 Ma

Scientific classification
- Kingdom: Animalia
- Phylum: Chordata
- Class: Actinopterygii
- Order: Siluriformes
- Suborder: Diplomystoidei
- Family: †Bachmanniidae; Azpelicueta & Cione, 2011
- Genus: †Bachmannia; Dolgopol, 1941
- Species: †B. chubutensis

Binomial name
- †Bachmannia chubutensis Dolgopol, 1941

Synonyms
- Arius argentinus Dolgopol, 1941

Extinct species of fish

Bachmannia is an extinct genus of ray-finned fish from the order of the catfishes (Siluriformes), containing a single species, B. chubutensis (syn.: Arius argentinus Dolgopol, 1941). Fossils of the species, dated to the early Eocene, were found in the Laguna del Hunco site, a caldera in the Argentinean province of Chubut, which is filled with fine-grained, layered mudstones and sandstones interspersed with pyroclastic deposits. The genus was named by Mathilde Dolgopol de Sáez, in honor of the German physician and naturalist Franz Ewald Theodor Bachmann.

Bachmannia chubutensis lived during the climatic optimum of the early Eocene. The Laguna del Hunco was located on the southern edge of the tropics, in a humid climate with a distinct maritime influence. Volcanic activity with the release of gases into the water led to regular mass deaths of fish.

== Characteristics ==
Bachmannia chubutensis was a small catfish species with a rather stocky body. The almost completely preserved holotype is 8 cm long (caudal fin missing). The maximum standard length of the species is given as less than 12.5 cm. The head and forebody were relatively high. The head profile was convex and reminiscent of the head shape of the armored catfish genus Corydoras. The neurocranium was heavily ossified. Compared to the usually small teeth of recent catfish species, the teeth of Bachmannia chubutensis were large. These teeth were conical with broad tooth bases. The maxillary teeth were also serrated (two rows of teeth), a primitive feature for catfishes that is only found in the recent Diplomystidae and the extinct Hypsidoridae. The dorsal fin was located between the fifth and thirteenth vertebrae and was supported by a first, short fin spine with a triangular cross-section, a long second fin spine with longitudinal grooves and seven soft rays. The anal fin had ten fin rays.

Bachmannia chubutensis is the only known species of the genus Bachmannia and is placed in the monotypic family Bachmanniidae, which is the sister group of the primitive catfishes (Diplomystidae). A common feature (synapomorphy) of Bachmanniidae and Diplomystidae is a double, anterior articular head of the palatinum.
