= Nevobatrachus =

Nevobatrachus Temporal range: Lower Cretaceous, 125.0–112.0 Ma

Scientific classification
- Kingdom: Animalia
- Phylum: Chordata
- Class: Amphibia
- Order: Anura
- Genus: Nevobatrachus; Mahony, 2019
- Species: N. gracilis

Binomial name
- Nevobatrachus gracilis (Nevo, 1968)

Extinct genus of amphibians

Nevobatrachus gracilis is the only species in the extinct genus Nevobatrachus, a genus of prehistoric frogs. The original generic name of this frog was Cordicephalus Nevo (1968); however, this generic name turned out to be preoccupied by a cestode genus Cordicephalus Wardle, McLeod & Stewart (1947), which remains nomenclaturally available in spite of being considered a junior synonym of the diphyllobothriid genus Pyramicocephalus. Mahony (2019) coined a replacement name Nevobatrachus. Fossils of N. gracilis were found in a lacustrine deposit in Makhtesh Ramon called "Amphibian Hill" and it is believed they lived during the Lower Cretaceous.

When first described by Eviatar Nevo of the University of Haifa (in 1968) the genus Cordicephalus was thought to contain two species, C. gracilis and C. longicostatus. Since then it was redescribed and it was determined that N. gracilis was the only species in the genus.

== Etymology ==
The original genus' name derives from the Latin cordi (cor meaning heart) and cephalus (meaning head). The name comes from the heart-like shape of its skull. The species name, gracilis, comes from the Latin for slender. The replacement generic name is derived from the surname of Eviatar Nevo and from batrachus, a Greek word for a frog.

== Description ==
Like its close relatives, N. gracilis was fairly small, about 30 millimetres (1.2 in) in length. It had a flat skull which was almost as wide as it was long, features usually found in aquatic animals. Other features that support that view that N. gracilis had a mainly aquatic lifestyle is its short axial column as well as large foot bones which may imply extensive webbing.

== Taxonomy ==
Nevobatrachus is considered to be a member of the clade Pipimorpha, related to the living family Pipidae.

== See also ==
- List of prehistoric amphibians
