= Parasphenoid =

Bone in the cranium of some vertebrates

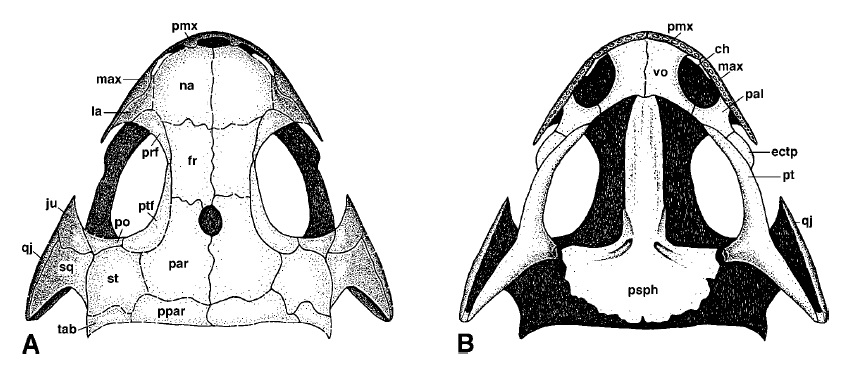
Skull of the temnospondyl Tungussogyrinus with the parasphenoid on the underside of the skull labeled "psph"

The parasphenoid is a bone which can be found in the cranium of many vertebrates. It is an unpaired dermal bone which lies at the midline of the roof of the mouth. In many reptiles (including birds), it fuses to the endochondral (cartilage-derived) basisphenoid bone of the lower braincase, forming a bone known as the parabasisphenoid. Early mammals have a small parasphenoid, but for the most part its function has been replaced by the vomer bone. The parasphenoid has been lost in placental mammals and caecilian amphibians. In many early tetrapods the parasphenoid bears teeth (palatal dentition).

== See also ==
- Ossification of frontal bone
- Terms for anatomical location
