= Friedrich Wilms =

- Born: April 19, 1848; Münster, Westphalia
- Died: March 2, 1919 (aged 70); Berlin-Steglitz, Weimar Republic
- Notable work: Ein botanischer Ausflug ins Boerenland

Friedrich Wilms (19 April 1848, in Münster, Westphalia – 2 March 1919, in Berlin-Steglitz), was a German apothecary, botanical collector and traveller.

Wilms voyaged to South Africa on the same boat as Bachmann, arriving in Cape Town on 4 July 1883. Bachmann disembarked and Wilms sailed on to Durban. He travelled by train to Pietermaritzburg where he started collecting. From here he made use of an ox-wagon to get to Greytown and northwest to Ladysmith, crossing the Natal Drakensberg at Laing's Nek on 17 November 1883. From here he travelled north to Pretoria, east to Bronkhorstspruit and further east to Lydenburg which was to be his headquarters for the next 13 years. Using Lydenburg as his base, he made a number of collecting trips. He also ventured through the malaria-infested coastal flats of Portuguese East Africa to reach Delagoa Bay, choosing the winter season when there were fewer mosquitoes about.

In 1896 he returned to Germany with an extensive collection of mosses, lichens, ferns and phanerogams. His paper of 1898 entitled "Ein botanischer Ausflug ins Boerenland" which appeared in Verh. Bot. Ver. Prov. Brandenb., included interesting observations on the vegetation.

Wilms was later appointed as an assistant in the moss section of the Botanical Museum Berlin-Dahlem and was also closely involved in the taxonomy of specimens collected by August Gottlieb Hans Rudatis. He is commemorated in numerous specific names such as Kirkia wilmsii Engl., Melolobium wilmsii Harms, Argyrolobium wilmsii Harms, Streptocarpus wilmsii Engl., Polygala wilmsii Chodat, Salix wilmsii Seem. and Lejeunea wilmsii Steph.
