= Bachmanniomyces =

Scientific classification
- Kingdom: Fungi
- Division: Ascomycota
- Genus: Bachmanniomyces; D. Hawksw.

Genus of fungi

Bachmanniomyces is a genus of fungi with unclear classification.

Species:

- Bachmanniomyces australis
- Bachmanniomyces carniolicus
- Bachmanniomyces muscigenae
- Bachmanniomyces pseudocyphellariae
- Bachmanniomyces punctum
- Bachmanniomyces santessonii
- Bachmanniomyces uncialicola
- Bachmanniomyces varius
