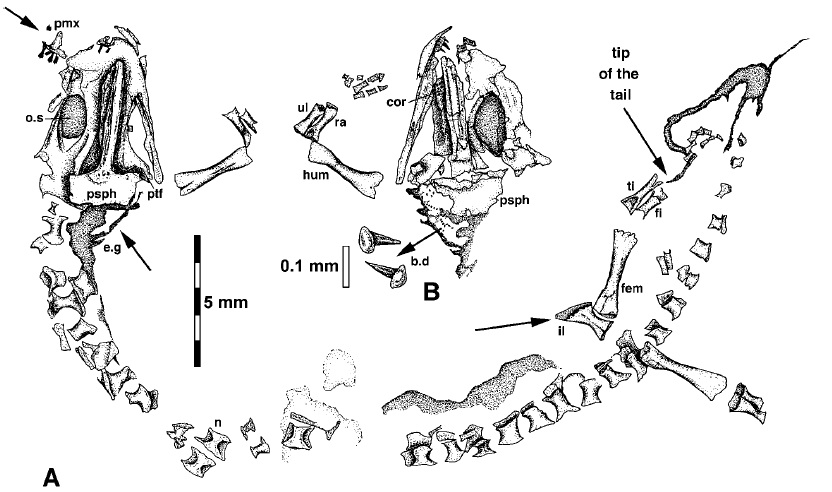
- Diagram of the skeleton PIN 4262/4a
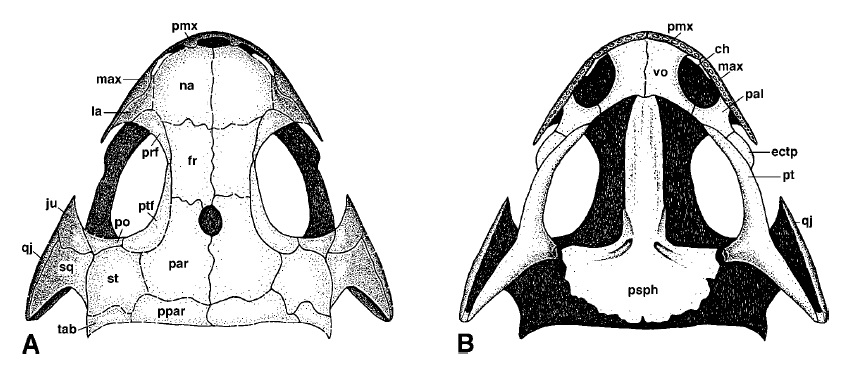
- Skull diagram

Scientific classification
- Kingdom: Animalia
- Phylum: Chordata
- Clade: Tetrapoda
- Order: †Temnospondyli
- Family: †Branchiosauridae
- Subfamily: †Tungussogyrininae; Kuhn, 1962
- Genus: †Tungussogyrinus; Efremov, 1939

Type species
- †Tungussogyrinus bergi Efremov, 1939

= Tungussogyrinus =

Tungussogyrinus Temporal range: Late Permian - Early Triassic

Extinct genus of amphibians

Tungussogyrinus is an extinct genus of temnospondyl amphibian in the family Branchiosauridae. It has been assigned to its own subfamily, Tungussogyrininae.
