= Kuruleufenia =

Kuruleufenia Temporal range: Late Cretaceous

Scientific classification
- Kingdom: Animalia
- Phylum: Chordata
- Class: Amphibia
- Order: Anura
- Family: Pipidae
- Genus: †Kuruleufenia
- Species: †K. xenopoides

Binomial name
- †Kuruleufenia xenopoides Gómez, 2016

Extinct genus of frogs

Kuruleufenia is an extinct genus of pipid that lived in Argentina during the Late Cretaceous. It contains the species K. xenopoides.
