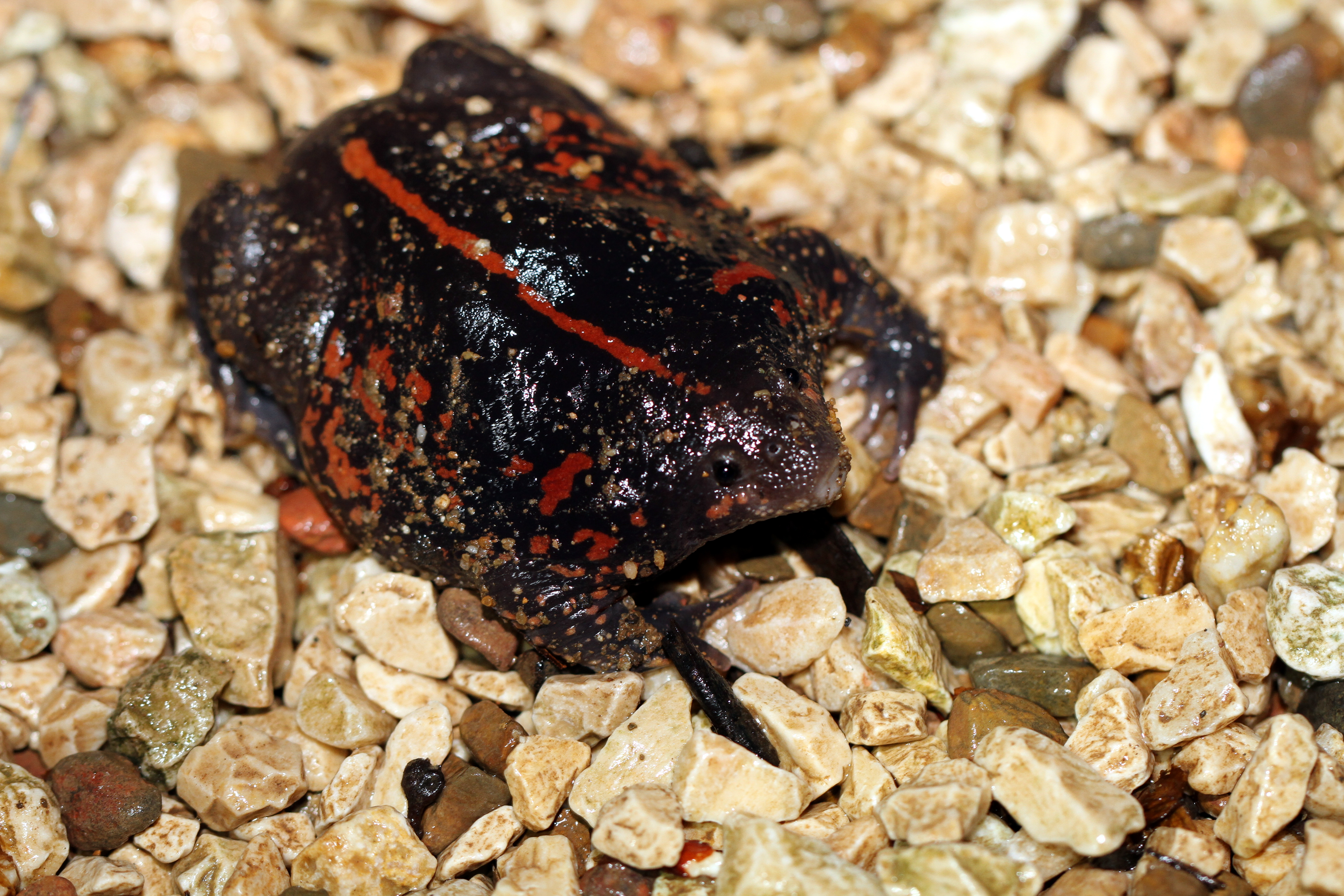

Conservation status
- Least Concern (IUCN 3.1)

Scientific classification
- Kingdom: Animalia
- Phylum: Chordata
- Class: Amphibia
- Order: Anura
- Family: Rhinophrynidae
- Genus: Rhinophrynus; A. M. C. Duméril & Bibron, 1841
- Species: R. dorsalis

Binomial name
- Rhinophrynus dorsalis A. M. C. Duméril & Bibron, 1841
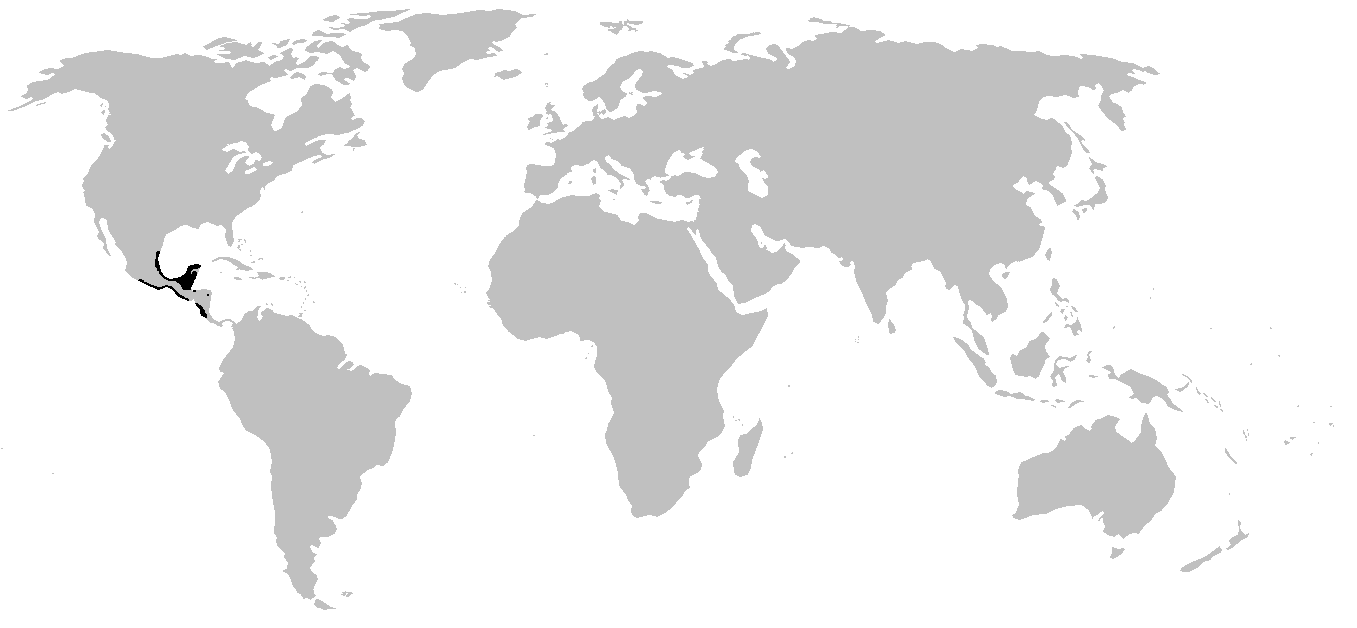
- Distribution of R. dorsalis (in black)

= Mexican burrowing toad =

Species of amphibian

The Mexican burrowing toad (Rhinophrynus dorsalis) is the single living representative of the family Rhinophrynidae. It is a unique species in its taxonomy and morphology, with special adaptations to assist them in digging burrows where they spend most of their time. These adaptations include a small pointed snout and face, keratinized structures and a lack of webbing on front limbs, and specialized tongue morphology to assist in feeding on ants and termites underground. The body is nearly equal in width and length. It is a dark brown to black color with a red-orange stripe on its back along with splotches of color on its body. The generic name Rhinophrynus means 'nose-toad', from rhino- (ῥῑνο-), the combining form of the Ancient Greek rhis (ῥίς, 'nose') and phrunē (φρύνη, 'toad').

The Mexican burrowing toad diverged from other amphibians over 190 million years ago and has been evolving independently for a longer period of time than the evolutionary differences between mammals like humans, fruit bats, polar bears and killer whales. Its closest sister group is Pipidae, or the aquatic clawed frogs.

== Description ==
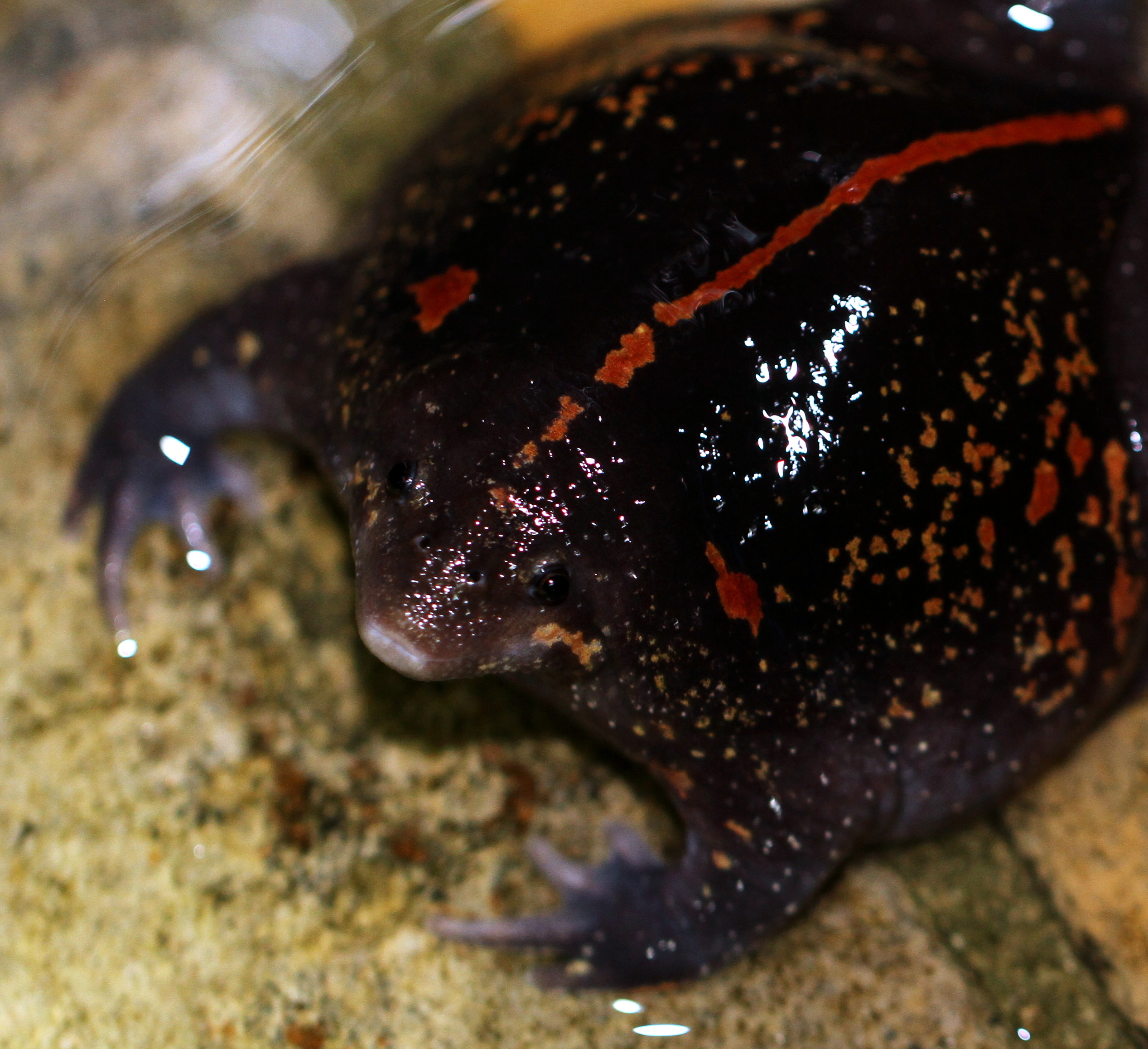
Head of a Mexican burrowing toad from Belize (1 June 2015)

The Mexican burrowing toad has a unique appearance that makes it easy to distinguish from other organisms. This species' body is flat with a width and length that are almost equal. It is covered in loosely fitting wrinkled skin which becomes taut and shiny when the frog's body swells up during its mating call. Its head is small and triangular, and projects out of its body in a small point with very small eyes. They have no neck and no visible ear holes or tympanum. Its legs are short and muscular, and are structured for burrowing as indicated by its name. Its feet also have adaptations for burrowing, mainly nail-like keratinized structures at the end of each digit. Its front feet lack webbing between the digits to free them up for burrowing, and its back feet are short and extensively webbed.

The toad's coloration ranges from a dark brown to black. A bright red-orange stripe runs on its back from head to tail, and the body is covered with other red-orange splotches in varying patterns. Its underside is gray to dark brown and does not have the red splotches like the rest of the body. The toad is sexually dimorphic, with females being larger than males. Adults of the Mexican burrowing toad grow to be between 75 and 88 mm or about 3.0 to 3.3 inches (snout-vent length).

=== Feeding specializations ===
The toad's snout is covered in an armor of small keratinous spines, and its lips are sealed by secretions from glands under the mandible. Its lips have a double closure along their maxillary arch, which are enhanced by the glands under the jaw. Morphological studies reveal that the frog has a type of tongue protrusion that is distinct from that of other frogs. Many other frog species project their tongues by a lingual flip, a behavior where the tongue is strongly flipped through the lips and out of the mouth. In this species however, the tongue stiffens and protrudes out of the mouth by moving the jaw backwards. This mechanism is specialized for capturing small insect prey in burrows.

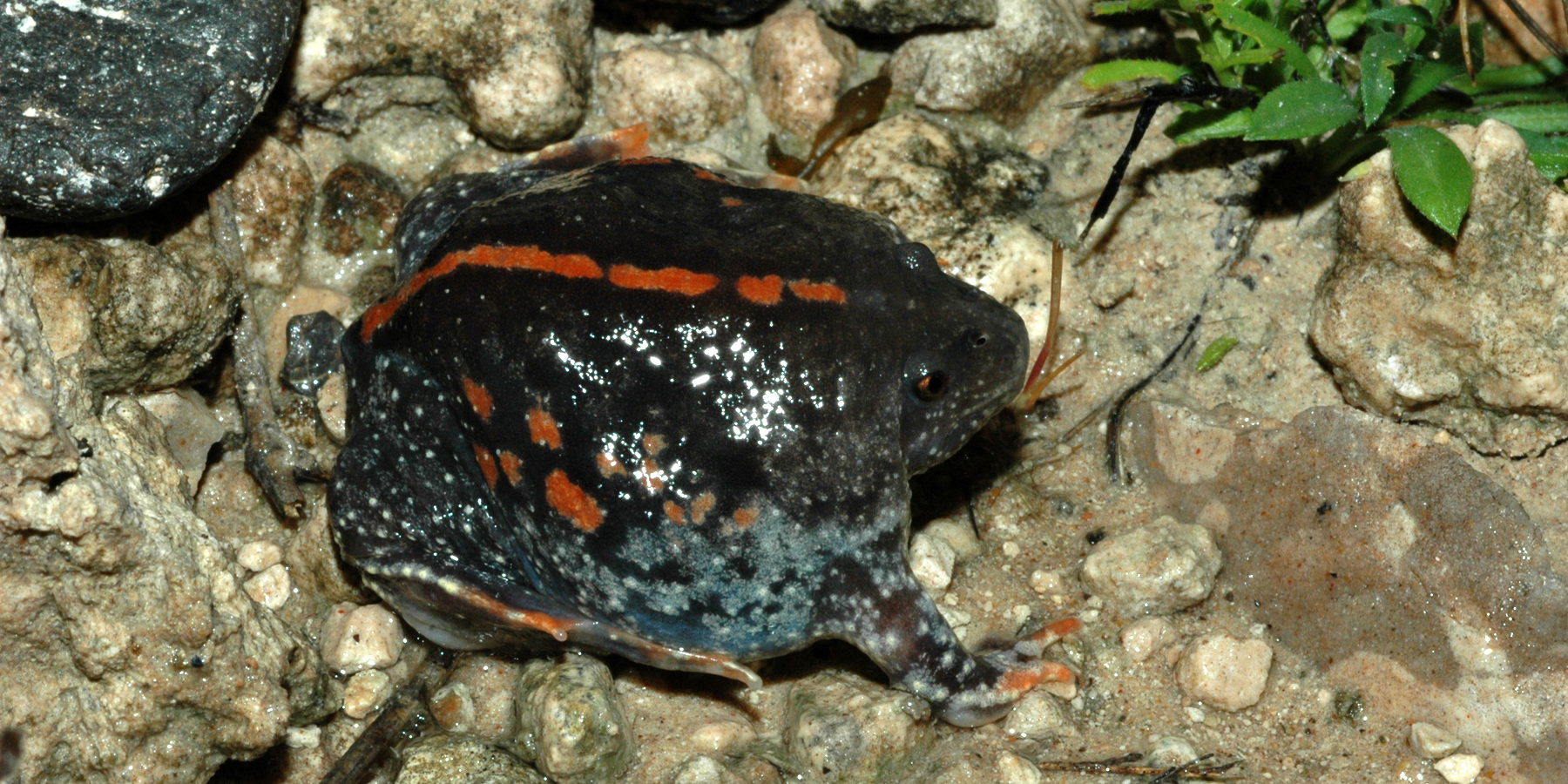
Burrowing toad (Rhinophrynus dorsalis), Municipality of Reynosa, Tamaulipas, Mexico (8 October 2007).

== Distribution ==
The Mexican burrowing toad is found in tropical and subtropical dry broadleaf forest, savannas, and thorn scrub (e.g. Tamaulipan mezquital) in the lowlands of Central America, Mexico, and extreme south Texas, USA. Due to its wide range, the species is categorized as least concern by the IUCN, but some local and regional populations are protected and listed as threatened by various governments within its distribution.

Rhinophrynus dorsalis occurs in the Lower Rio Grande Valley of south Texas, USA, ranging southward through the costal lowlands of the Gulf of Mexico and Caribbean Sea in eastern Mexico including much of the Yucatán Peninsula, into northern Guatemala, Belize, extreme northwest Honduras, and an isolated record from northeast Nicaragua. Another geographically isolated population occurs in the lowlands of the Pacific coast, from extreme southern Michoacán, Mexico, southward into coastal areas of Guatemala, El Salvador, Nicaragua, Honduras, and northwest Costa Rica.

=== Evolutionary history ===
The oldest fossil of the genus is Rhinophrynus canadensis known from the late Eocene of Saskatchewan, Canada. Other fossils are known from the Oligocene of Florida.

== Habitat ==
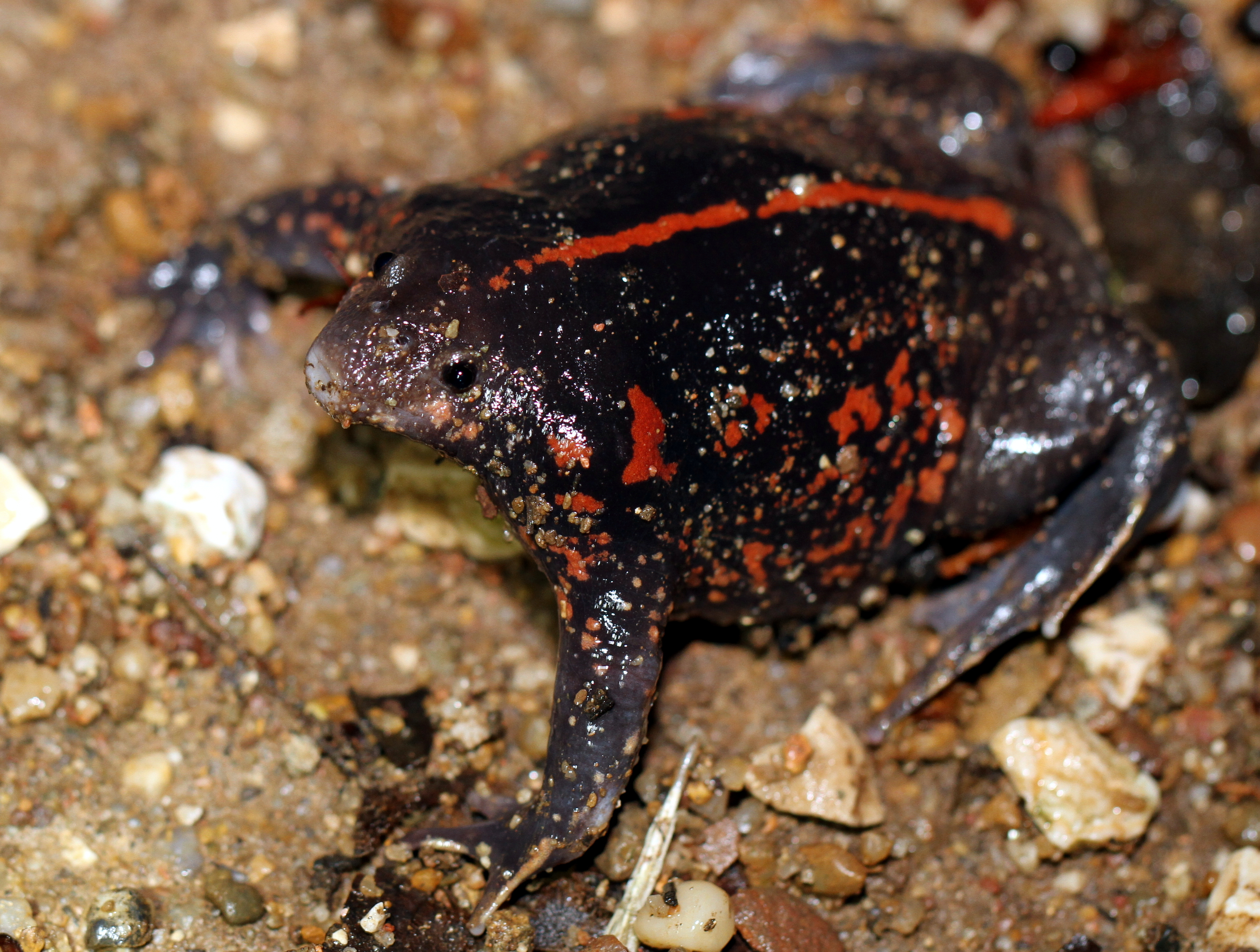
A Mexican burrowing toad from the Cayo District of Belize (1 June 2015)

Its natural habitats include forest, savanna, shrubland, grassland, and inland wetlands. It primarily inhabits lowland areas of tropical dry and moist forests. It is generally associated with areas which are seasonally flooded because it relies on temporary ponds for breeding. It usually remains underground in the dry season following the breeding period. Its eggs and larvae develop in temporary pools formed by heavy rains, and the adults remain in fairly small areas.

== Behavior ==
This species is nocturnal. These frogs make burrows to survive the dry season without suffering from lack of water. They use their strong short limbs and nails to dig into the soil and create burrows. The frog can survive long periods of drought inside this burrow. When the frog is making its vocalization or when it is alarmed its body becomes inflated and resembles a balloon, with its already short head and limbs almost disappearing. This mechanism is not deeply studied, and may require more research to determine its physiology.

== Diet ==
The Mexican burrowing toad primarily subsists on ants and termites that they forage underground. Their features are specialized for underground foraging, especially the way the tongue is used by shifting it forward rather than the lingual flip seen in other frogs. This mode is unique among anurans, and is highly specialized for capturing small insects in burrows.

== Reproduction and life cycle ==
This species has a characteristically short and explosive breeding period, often lasting only one to three days. This explosive breeding combined with the ecological condition of dry seasonal forests have influenced the evolution of their courtship behavior and male-female interactions. There is size sexual dimorphism in this species with females being larger than males, and male-male contests are largely absent during the short breeding period. Due to the absence of male-male competition and territoriality, females select their mates based on the frequency and tonality of advertisement calls. The characteristics of the advertisement call can give females insight to male size, which affects mating with larger females opting for larger mates over smaller ones.

=== Breeding ===
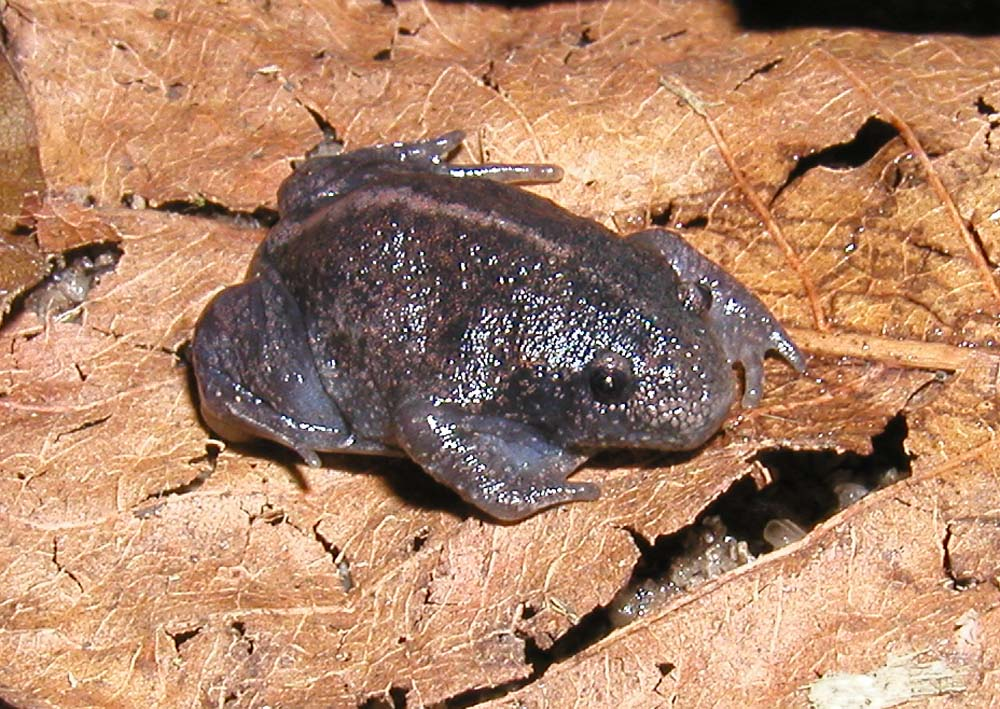
A recently metamorphosed Mexican burrowing toad, Palo Verde Biological Station, Costa Rica.

Breeding in this species occurs after heavy rains in small temporary pools. Based on Costa Rican populations, clutch sizes range from 2,000 to 8,000 eggs. The Mexican burrowing toads are considered explosive breeders, and reproduce in a way where many individuals exit burrows at the same time to gather at temporary pools of water for breeding to occur. The males then float on the surface of the water and inflate their bodies while making a characteristic call that attracts females. The toad's mating periods is between one and three days, one of the shortest seasons among amphibians, and after this period they burrow back into the ground and remain there until the next breeding season.

=== Sexual maturity ===
Sexual maturity in the Mexican burrowing toad is determined by examining testes size in males and ovarian stages in females. The presence of enlarged testes and a larger body size is used to determine maturity in males, and various ovarian characteristics including oviduct size and shape are used in females. Females are most likely to be carrying eggs during May and June, but reproduction can occur in October and January as well. In one study the clutch size ranged from 1,000 to around 8,000 eggs, with larger females carrying proportionally more eggs. R. dorsalis will live underground for most of the year and emerges with heavy rains. The males then float on the surface of water and call to females which results in amplexus. After mating and laying eggs in the water, the environment dries and they will burrow back into the ground. Tadpoles hatch in a few days and transform into adults after one to three months of metamorphosis.

=== Female/Male interactions ===
Competition between males for females relies primarily on acoustic communication, with males depending on the impressive calls they make to attract females. The short breeding season imposes constraints on their courtship behavior and breeding formations. Because the breeding season is so short, there is more incentive to spend time breeding rather than competing with other males. Therefore, there are few antagonistic interactions between the males of this species and female choice is based on acoustic displays rather than physical competition or territory defense.

Males produce two types of mating calls during the breeding season to attract females. These calls are the pre-advertisement and advertisement calls. In one observational study of the reproductive behavior of The Mexican burrowing toad, the pre-advertisement call was often produced just before the advertisement call. The advertisement call is a single tone with an upward tone, with a duration of about 1.36 seconds. The pre-advertisement call was a single short sound without modulation, and was of higher frequency than the advertisement calls.

The calls attract females, after which the male and female will participate in amplexus. In all the mating pairs of R. dorsalis, females mate with smaller males but large females often mate with the larger males present. Females will inflate their bodies during breeding season which allows them to reduce the ability of smaller males to maintain amplexus.

== Conservation ==
The population trend of the Mexican burrowing toad is described as stable and as of 2019 it is listed as being of least concern by the IUCN. In Mexico and Central America it is widespread and locally abundant in many areas within its range. The species is protected by Mexican law under the Special Protection category. In the state of Texas, USA, it is listed as a threatened species due to the extensive areas of its habitat that have been converted for agricultural uses and urban development in its limited distribution there.
