= Albionbatrachus =

Albionbatrachus Temporal range: Upper Eocene–Lower Miocene, 37.2–17 Ma

Scientific classification
- Kingdom: Animalia
- Phylum: Chordata
- Class: Amphibia
- Order: Anura
- Family: †Palaeobatrachidae
- Genus: †Albionbatrachus; Meszoely, Špinar and Ford, 1984

Type species
- †Albionbatrachus wightensis Meszoely, Špinar and Ford, 1984

Other species
- A. oligocenicus Venczel, Codrea & Fărcaș, 2012

Extinct genus of frogs

Albionbatrachus is an extinct genus of frogs from England and Romania that lived during the Eocene and Miocene. Two species are recognized:

- Albionbatrachus oligocenicus
- Albionbatrachus wightensis

== Discovery and naming ==
=== Discovery ===
A.wightensis was described from sifted material found in the Headon Hill beds near Alum Bay, Isle of Wight. The holotype of A. wightensis (MCZ 8784) consists of an almost complete frontoparietal bone, although other isolated elements assigned to the species by the original paper also include elements of the spine.

A.oligocenicus was found in the upper Dancu formation near Suceag, Romania; the holotype (UBB V 442) also consists of nearly complete frontoparietal bones. Other isolated elements referred to A. oligocenicus include other cranial bones, along with fragments of humeri and pelvic bones.

==== Etymology ====
The genus name combines Albion which is Latin for England and batrachus meaning frog in Greek. The species name for A. wightensis refers to the area of discovery being the Isle of Wight, and oligocenicus refers to the Greek name for the Oligocene.

== Description ==
The main distinguishing factor is the frontoparietal bone having an hourglass shape; other features include the frontoparietal being flat and ornamented, paraoccipital processes extending past the posterior median process and the middle layer containing large cavities connected to the frontoparietal by inclined canals.

=== A. wightensis ===
A. wightensis has prominent lateral corners to the frontoparietal which form spurlike processes, and has a synsacrum.

=== A. oligocenicus ===
A. oligocenicus differs from A. wightensis from a lack of dorsal anterior depression, less pronounced dorsal sculptures, lower occipital ridge, paraoccpital processes being more elevated dorsally, the back section of Meckel's cartilage being ossified, and a small tubercle on the preacetabular portion of the ilium.

== Paleoecology ==
The presence of a synsacrum indicates an aquatic lifestyle similar to modern Xenopus toads and other members of Palaeobatrachidae. That said, differences in muscular insertion points in the skull and hips described from A. oligocenicus may also suggest changes to feeding and locomotory behaviour in Albionbatrachus relative to other palaeobatrachids. The authors of that species also posit that the extensive sculpturing of the frontoparietal bone related to increased vascularisation of the head - this would promote more effective gas exchange and thus allowed the animal to occupy a niche in lower oxygen lacustrine environments.

== See Also ==
- Prehistoric amphibian
- List of prehistoric amphibians
