= Shelania =

Shelania Temporal range: Ypresian-Bartonian (Mustersan) ~48.6–40.4 Ma

Scientific classification
- Kingdom: Animalia
- Phylum: Chordata
- Class: Amphibia
- Order: Anura
- Family: Pipidae
- Genus: †Shelania; Casamiquela 1960

Species
- †S. laurenti Baez & Pugener 1998; †S. pascuali Casamiquela 1960 (type)

Extinct genus of frogs

Shelania is an extinct genus of frogs that lived in South America during the Eocene. Its type species is Shelania pascuali. Fossils of Shelania have been found in the Mustersan Vaca Mahuida and Laguna del Hunco Formations of Argentina. Shelania is the type taxon of the Shelaniinae, which was erected for an unranked clade (defined in the context of phylogenetic nomenclature, although not in conformity with the PhyloCode, which was implemented later) that also includes the early anurans Saltenia, Kuruleufenia, and Patagopipa. A more recent phylogenetic analysis further suggested that Shelania is more closely related to Pipidae than to Palaeobatrachus, and that the second species previously attributed to Shelania (S. laurenti) is not sufficiently closely related to the type-species to be retained in Shelania.

== See also ==
- List of prehistoric amphibians
