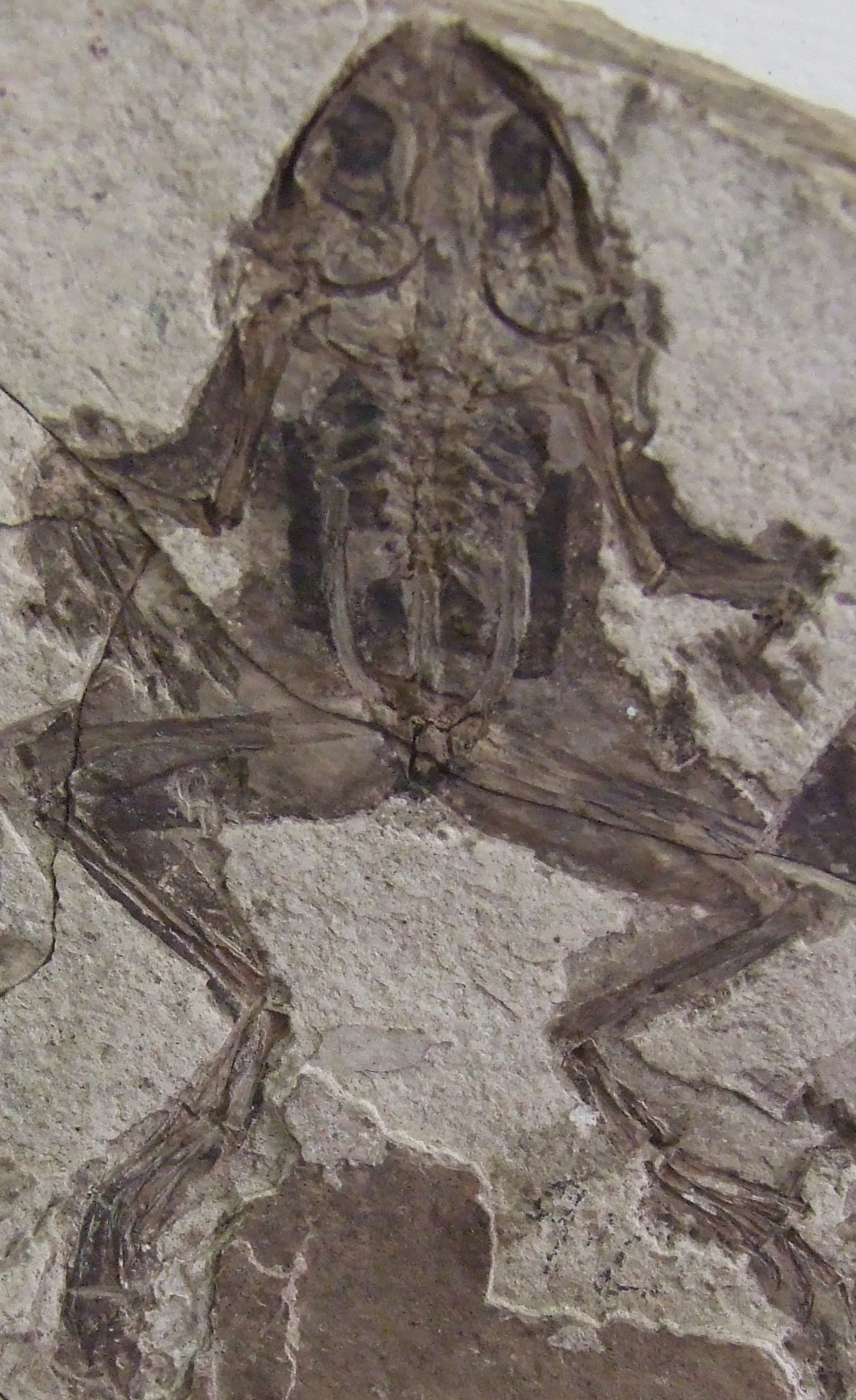
- Fossil of Palaeobatrachus grandipes

Scientific classification
- Kingdom: Animalia
- Phylum: Chordata
- Class: Amphibia
- Order: Anura
- Family: †Palaeobatrachidae
- Genus: †Palaeobatrachus; Tschudi, 1839

Species
- P. diluvianus (Goldfuss, 1831) (type); P. gigas Meyer, 1859; P. eurydices Villa et al. 2016; P. robustus Hossini & Rage, 2000

Synonyms
- Pliobatrachus

= Palaeobatrachus =

Palaeobatrachus Temporal range: Eocene–Middle Pleistocene

Extinct genus of primitive frogs

Palaeobatrachus (meaning "ancient frog" in Greek) is an extinct genus of frogs from Europe that existed from the middle Eocene to the middle Pleistocene (Ionian Stage) (621–568,000 years ago), spanning almost 50 million years. They were obligately aquatic, and would have not spent much time on dry land. They are one of two genera and by far the largest genus in the family Palaeobatrachidae, which are considered to be members of Pipimorpha, related to the South American-African family Pipidae, which includes the African clawed frog and Surinam toad.

== Description ==
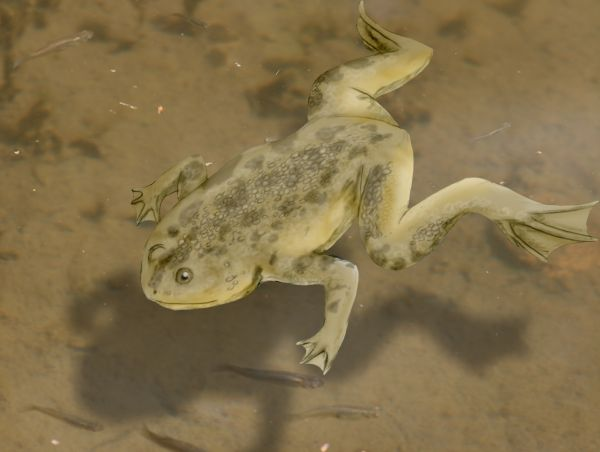
Restoration

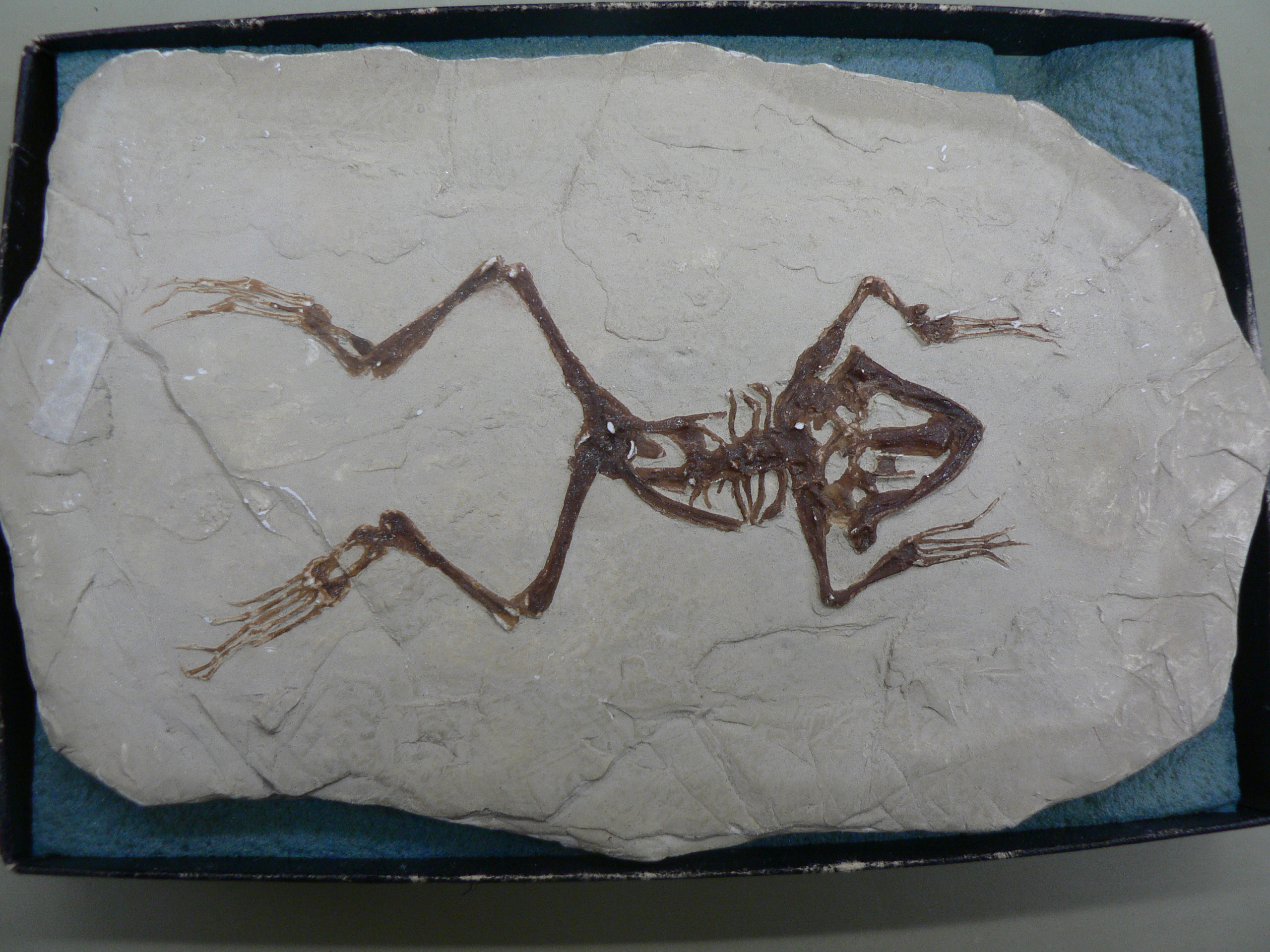
Cast of Palaeobatrachus fossil at the University of Alberta

Palaeobatrachus had a relatively broad skull the shape of a Gothic arch. Its body was relatively large, ranging from 8 to 10 centimetres (3.1 to 3.9 in) in length, and the female was usually larger than the male (sexual dimorphism).

== Taxonomy ==
Palaeobatrachus was the first fossil frog to be described, with the first species being P. diluvianus named by Goldfuss in 1831, originally as Rana diluviana from remains found in uppermost Oligocene strata near Bonn in Germany. It was later recognised as distinct and placed in the new separate genus Palaeobatrachus by Tschudi in 1839.

The Eocene genus Albionbatrachus was considered a synonym of Palaeobatrachus by Wuttke et al. (2012), but Roček et al. (2015) retained it as a separate taxon.

The nominal species Palaeobatrachus occidentalis was described from material found in the Late Cretaceous–Early Paleocene of western North America, but Roček (2013) questioned its generic attribution.

== Habitat and paleoecology ==
Its skeletal remains are plentiful in freshwater sediments in western Bohemia, in Geiseltal (west Germany) and in east Germany. They are sometimes preserved very well indeed, with impressions of internal organs, muscles, nerves, blood vessels and epidermis, and with traces of coloring. Tadpoles and eggs have also been found.

These frogs lived permanently in water. Their bag-shaped lungs, on the dorsal side of their body, enabled them to remain submerged for long periods. They inhabited through-drainage basins or swamps where brown coal deposits were formed. Like the African clawed toad, they probably lived on small crustaceans, insect larvae and small fish and themselves provided sustenance for many other animals.

The climatic change at the beginning of the Pliocene was a real catastrophe for Palaeobatrachus, which required warmth, and, being specialized, was unable to adapt itself to the altered conditions. Water-rich and warm environments that existed in the area of the Netherlands, acting as a refugium for Palaeobatrachus, made it possible for one species (P. eurydices) to survive in western Europe as recently as the early Pleistocene. In addition a species persisted in southern Russia until the mid Pleistocene.
