= Henson Gletscher Formation =

Geologic formation in Greenland

- Stratigraphic range: Cambrian
- Type: Formation

Location
- Country: Greenland

Type section
- Named for: Henson Gletscher

The Henson Gletscher Formation is a geologic formation in Greenland. It preserves fossils dating back to the Cambrian period. It is named after the Henson Glacier (Greenland). It preserves numerous phosphatocopines and bradoriids, alongside priapulid larvae such as Inuitiphlaskus and pentastomids like Dietericambria.

Color key: Taxon / Reclassified taxon / Taxon falsely reported as present / Dubious taxon or junior synonym / Ichnotaxon / Ootaxon / Morphotaxon

Notes
Uncertain or tentative taxa are in small text
~~crossed out~~ taxa are discredited.

== Paleobiota ==
Paleobiota
Genus	Species	Higher taxon	Notes	Images
Dietericambria	D. hensoniensis	Pentastomida	The earliest pentastomid fossil known	Dietericambria reconstruction
Perissopyge	P. phenax	Ptychopariida	Also known from various other formations	
Eoagnostus	E. roddyi	Agnostida		
Pagetides	P. elegans	Eodiscida		
Fritzolenellus	F. truemani	Olenelloidea		F. truemani from Canada
Ovatoryctocara	O. yaxiensis, O. granulata	Oryctocephalidae		
Arthricocephalus	A. chauveaui	Oryctocephalidae		A. chauveaui
Lancastria	L. plana	Oryctocephalidae		L. elongata fossil from China
Protoryctocephalus	P. arcticus	Oryctocephalidae		
Eoptychoparia	E. pearylandica	Ptychopariidae		
Bonnia	B. brennus	Dorypygidae		
Neopagetina	N. rjonsnitzkii	Hebediscidae		
Haliplanktos	H. jishouensis	Oryctocephalidae		
Oryctocephalus	O. indica	Oryctocephalidae	Indicator for transition between Cambrian Series 2 and 3	O. indicus fossil
Onchocephalus?	O?. freucheni	Ptychopariida		
Bathyuriscus	B. sp	Dolichometopidae	Also known from the Burgess Shale	Bathyuriscus specimens from elsewhere
Glossopleura	G. walcotti	Dolichometopidae	Quite widespread across North America	G. mckeei fossil from the Bright Angel Shale
Kootenia	K. nodosa	Dorypygidae	May be synonymous with Olenoides?	K. burgessensis fossil from the Burgess Shale
Hartshillia	H. inflata	Corynexochida		
Olenoides	O. sp	Dorypygidae	One of the best-known trilobites thanks to fossils from the Burgess Shale	3D reconstruction of O. serratus
Bolaspidella	B. sp	Ptychoparioidea		
Ogygopsis	O. klotzi, O. typicalis, O. batis, O. virgata	Dorypygidae	Very common in the Burgess Shale, but rare elsewhere	O. klotzi from the Burgess Shale
Parasolenopleura	P. aculeata	Solenopleuridae		
Zacanthoides	Z. blakeri	Corynexochida		
Elrathia	E. sp	Alokistocaridae	Incredibly abundant in the Wheeler Shale	E. kingii fossil from the Wheeler Shale
Syspacephalus	S. spp	Ptychopariidae	Known from three separate undescribed species	
Eodiscus	E. scanicus	Eodiscidae		
Costadiscus	C. minutus	Eodiscida		
Mongolitubulus	M. squamifer, M. reticulatus	Arthropoda	Enigmatic sclerite taxon	
Navarana	N. pearylandica	Bradoriida	Formerly assigned to Hipponicharion	
Liangshanella	?L. nivalis	Bradoriida		L. burgessensis fossil from the Burgess Shale
Pseudindiana	P. sipa	Phosphatocopida		
Dabashanella	D. retroswinga, D. longa, D?. lunaiformis	Phosphatocopida		Dabashanella reconstruction
Comleyopsis	C. qassutit	Phosphatocopida	Formerly classed under Liangshanella	
Onychodictyon	O. sp	Lobopodia	Known from complete fossils in the Maotianshan Shales	Restoration of Onychodictyon ferox
Microdictyon	M. robisoni	Lobopodia	Widespread genus of lobopodian, mostly known from sclerites	M. sinicum reconstruction
Inuitiphlaskus	I. kouchinskyi	Priapulida	A loricate (with lorica) priapulid larva	
Hadimopanella	H. apicata	Palaeoscolecida	Enigmatic sclerite taxon	
Blastozoa/“Pelmatozoa” indet.	Unapplicable	Echinodermata	Known from stem fragments and holdfasts	
Tarimspira	T. artemi	Paraconodontida	Possibly the earliest paraconodont?	
Cambroctoconus	C. koori	Octocorallia?	Only otherwise known from Asia	
Tavsenicoralla	T. avannaa	Eumetazoa	Branching “corallimorph”, may be a bryozoan?	
Olivooides?	O. sp	Medusozoa	Possibly known from very early embryonic stages	
Chancelloria	C. sp	Chancelloriidae	An enigmatic fossil known mostly from sclerites	C. pentacta from Utah
Allonnia	A. tetrathallis, A. erromenosa, A. quadrocornuformis, A. rossica	Chancelloriidae	An enigmatic fossil known mostly from sclerites	A. pennetta life reconstruction
Thoracospongia	T. lacrimiformis	Amphidiscosida?	Tentatively assigned to the family Stiodermatidae	
Dodecaactinella	D. oncera	Calcarea?	Also known from the Ordovician	
Eiffelia	E. floriformis	Eiffeliidae	Mainly known from the Burgess Shale	E. globosa from the Burgess Shale
Abnormisella	A. inseperata	Silicea	Possibly the same as Speciosuspongia?	
Australispongia?	A?. inuak	Silicea	Mainly known from other formations in Greenland	
Celtispongia	C. dorte	Silicea	Possibly also known from China	
Cjulanciella	C. asimmetrica	Silicea	Species name occasionally spelled as asymmetrica	
Kuonamia	K. fusiformis	Silicea	Renamed from Disparella	
Sanningasoqia	S. borealis	Silicea	Also found in the Holm Dal Formation	
Hertzina	H. elongata	Protoconodonta		
Amphigeisina	A. danica	Protoconodonta		
Hagionella	H. cultrata	Protoconodonta		
Gumella	G. cuneata	Protoconodonta		
Gapparodus	G. bisulcatus	Protoconodonta		
Paibiconus	P. proarcuatus	Protoconodonta		
Protowenella	P. flemingi	Orthothecida	Previously thought to be a helcionelloid mollusc	
Conotheca	C. hensoni	Circothecidae		
Tulenicornus	T. frykmani	Hyolithida		
Slapylites	S. sp	Hyolithida		
Crestjahitus	C. groenlandicus	Hyolithida		
Yuku	Y. tjurtu	Hyolithida		
Nausakia	N. thulensis	Naukatida	An unusual brachiopod with a hat-like lower valve	
Eoobolus	E. priscus	Linguloidea		
Acrothele	A. sp	Acrotheloidea		A. susidua from Utah
Linnarssonia	L. ?tuberculata	Acrotretida		L. sp
Tesella	T. deplanata	Tommotiida		
Hensoniconus	H. siku	Helcionelloidea	Previously placed in the genus Scenella	
Vendrascospira	V. frykmani, V. troelseni	Helcionelloidea	Formerly placed within Figurina	
Tavseniconus	T. erectus	Stenothecidae	Also known from Morocco	
Dorispira	D. accordionata, D. arguta, D. avannga, D. septentrionalis, D. tavsenensis, D. tippik, ?D. penecyrano	Helcionelloidea	A relatively widespread helcionelloid	
Parailsanella	P. sp	Helcionelloidea	Only known from one internal mould in Henson Gletscher	
Sermeqiconus	S. polaris	Helcionelloidea	Referred tentatively to Figurina	
Mellopegma	M. chelata, M. georginense, M. schizocheras	Stenothecidae	Known from hundreds of specimens	
Erugoconus	E. acuminatus	Helcionelloidea	Family uncertain	
Eotebenna	E. arctica	Helcionelloidea	Only known otherwise from Australia	
Yochelcionella	Y. greenlandica, Y. gracilis	Helcionelloidea	Bears an unusual “snorkel” from the back of its shell	Y. cyrano reconstruction
Nyboeconus	N. robisoni	Helcionelloidea	Similar shells were formerly placed as enigmatic fossils	
Capitoconus	C. borealis	Helcionelloidea		
Coreospira	C. sp	Helcionelloidea		
Stenothecoides	S. elongata, S. terraglaciei	Stenothecoidea	Enigmatic shelled genus, maybe a brachiopod or mollusc	
Stenothecella	S. sibirica	Stenothecoidea	Enigmatic shelled genus, maybe a brachiopod or mollusc	
Costipelagiella	C. nevadense	Pelagiellidae		
Hyolithellus	H. micans	Hyolithelminthida		
Torrelella	T. sp	Hyolithelminthida		
Coleoloides	C. typicalis	Hyolithelminthida		
Sphenothallus	S. sp	Conulariida?	Enigmatic holdfast, possibly a conulariid	Sphenothallus from the Ordovician of the US
Cambrocoryne	C. lagenamorpha	incertae sedis	Bears some similarities to foraminiferans and sclerites of Wiwaxia	
Aetholicopalla	A. adnata	incertae sedis	Resembles Archaeooides	
Laugephakos	L. groenlandicus	incertae sedis	Resembles hyolithelminthids	
Hensonidendra	H. hensoniensis, H. tavsenica	incertae sedis	Resembles bryozoans, “corallimorphs”, and epiphytaceans	
Eohyella	E. spp	Cyanobacteria	Resembles modern Hyella	Microscope image of modern Hyella caespitosa
Girvanella	G. spp	Oscillatoriaceae		
Subtiflora	S. sp	Oscillatoriaceae		
Epiphyton	E. sp	Cyanobacteria		

== See also ==
- List of fossiliferous stratigraphic units in Greenland
