= Camya =

Camya Temporal range: early Middle Cambrian

Scientific classification
- Domain: Eukaryota
- Kingdom: Animalia
- Phylum: Mollusca
- Class: Bivalvia
- Order: †Fordillida
- Family: †Camyidae
- Genus: †Camya
- Species: †C. asy

Binomial name
- †Camya asy Hinz-Schallreuter, 1995

Extinct genus of bivalves

Camya is an extinct genus of early bivalve and is the only genus in the extinct family Camyidae. The genus is known solely from early Middle Cambrian fossils found in Europe. The genus currently contains a solitary accepted species, Camya asy.

== Description ==
Camya asy is a small bivalve which was first described in 1995 by Ingelore Hinz-Schallreuter. The genus and species are based on the fossils of two juvenile specimens which are both incomplete due to only the left valve of each being recovered. The fossils were found in sediments of the middle Cambrian aged Exsulans limestone which outcrops on the island of Bornholm in the Baltic Sea. The valves have a distinct subtriangular shape and possess a long straight hinge. The umbo is positioned notably anterior on the shell and the beak is bracketed by two teeth of indistinctly pyramidal shape. The presence of the teeth was later questioned in a 1998 study by G. Geyer and M. Streng and cited the lack of preserved muscle scars as reason to suspect the placement of Camya asy in Bivalvia.

The family Camyidae was first proposed by Hinz-Schallreuter in a 2000 paper discussing the Cambrian bivalves from Bornholm and reviewing the proposed Cambrian bivalve taxa of the time. In the same paper, Hinz-Schallreuter noted that the species Modiolopsis thecoides, known from one specimen which is now lost, most likely belonged to Camya. As of 2011 the family has been placed as a sister taxon to the family Fordillidae in the Superfamily Fordilloidea. This superfamily includes the earliest confirmed crown group bivalves to have been described. Camya is one of only four accepted bivalve genera to have been described from the Cambrian, the other three being Fordilla, Pojetaia, and Tuarangia.
