= Oelandia =

Oelandia Temporal range: Middle Cambrian

Scientific classification
- Domain: Eukaryota
- Kingdom: Animalia
- Phylum: Mollusca
- Class: †Helcionelloida
- Order: †Helcionelliformes
- Superfamily: †Helcionelloidea
- Genus: †Oelandia; Westergård, 1936

Extinct genus of molluscs

Oelandia is an extinct genus of basal molluscs of the family helcionellid from the Middle Cambrian of Sweden, China and North America. It has a small, upwards-pointing anterior snorkel with a closed end. It bears pronounced concentric ribbing around its strongly coiled exogastric shell.
