= Eotebenna =

Eotebenna Temporal range: Early Cambrian–Mid Cambrian

Scientific classification
- Kingdom: Animalia
- Phylum: Mollusca
- Class: †Helcionelloida
- Order: †Helcionelliformes
- Family: †Yochelcionellidae
- Genus: †Eotebenna; Runnegar & Jell, 1976

Species
- E. artica Peel, 1989; E. papilio Runneger & Jell, 1976; E. pontifex Runnegar & Jell, 1976 (type); E. viviannae Peel 1991

Extinct genus of molluscs

Eotebenna is a genus of helcionellid from the Early to Middle Cambrian of Greenland, Denmark and Australia, with sail-like "snorkels", similar to Latouchella.
