= Diasoma =

Diasoma is a proposed clade of mollusks uniting the classes Scaphopoda and Bivalvia. Whether scaphopods and bivalves are each other's closest living relatives among mollusks is disputed, leaving the monophyly of Diasoma in doubt.

Diasoma was originally proposed on morphological grounds by Bruce Runnegar and John Pojeta Jr., in 1974. The name means "through-body", referring to the relatively straight gut with a mouth at the anterior end and anus at the posterior end, contrasting with gastropods and cephalopods, in which the gut is more curved and the mouth and anus are usually much closer together. The grouping was accepted by many studies in the 1980s and 1990s, but a phylogenetic analysis of 18s rDNA conducted by Gerhard Steiner and Hermann Dreyer in 2003 found scaphopods to be more closely related to cephalopods than bivalves. A 2020 phylogenetic analysis by Kevin Kocot and colleagues found scaphopods to be more closely related to gastropods than bivalves. However, a molecular phylogenetic analysis published by Hao Song and colleagues in 2023 supports the monophyly of Diasoma.

The extinct rostroconchs, a group possibly ancestral to the Scaphopoda, are also considered to belong to Diasoma. Song and colleagues inferred that Diasoma originated approximately 520 million years ago, during the Cambrian period, and considered the earlier fossil genera Anabarella, Watsonella, and Mellopegma to be members of the diasome stem group.
