= Eurekapegma =

Eurekapegma Temporal range: Middle Cambrian

Scientific classification
- Kingdom: Animalia
- Phylum: Mollusca
- Class: †Helcionelloida
- Order: †Helcionelliformes
- Superfamily: †Helcionelloidea
- Genus: †Eurekapegma

Extinct genus of molluscs

Eurekapegma is a helcionellid from the Middle Cambrian of New Zealand. It is flattened sideways, with a dividing wall within its shell; it resembles the helcionellid Eotebenna.
