= Mackinnonia =

Mackinnonia Temporal range: Late Early Cambrian

Scientific classification
- Kingdom: Animalia
- Phylum: Mollusca
- Class: †Helcionelloida
- Order: †Helcionelliformes
- Family: †Helcionellidae
- Genus: †Mackinnonia; Runnegar 1980

Species
- M. taconica (Landing & Bartovski 1996) Skovsted & Peel 2007; M. rostratum Zhou & Xiao 1984 (type)

Extinct genus of molluscs

Mackinnonia is a genus of small shelly fossil comprising straight or slightly coiled shells of the helcionelloid type. The outer surface of their shell is smooth, whereas the inner surface has a net-like ridges. They are known from late Early Cambrian rocks across North America and Greenland.
