= Tuarangia =

Tuarangia Temporal range: early Middle Cambrian

Scientific classification
- Domain: Eukaryota
- Kingdom: Animalia
- Phylum: Mollusca
- Class: Bivalvia
- Informal group: †Euprotobranchia
- Order: †Tuarangiida; MacKinnon, 1982
- Family: †Tuarangiidae; MacKinnon, 1982
- Genus: †Tuarangia; MacKinnon, 1982

Species
- T. gravgaerdensis; T. paparua

Extinct genus of bivalves

Tuarangia is a Cambrian shelly fossil interpreted as an early bivalve, though alternative classifications have been proposed and its systematic position remains controversial. It is the only genus in the extinct family Tuarangiidae and order Tuarangiida. The genus is known solely from Middle to Late Cambrian fossils found in Europe and New Zealand. The genus currently contains two accepted species, Tuarangia gravgaerdensis and the type species Tuarangia paparua.

== Description ==
Tuarangia is a minute bivalve which was first described in 1982 by David I. MacKinnon of the University of Canterbury in Christchurch, New Zealand. Generally the shells of Tuarangia are subquadrate to trapezoidal and elongate in shape. The long hinge is straight with an indistinct umbone positioned close to the lateral midline of the hinge. The subparallel bar-like teeth of Tuarangia are taxodontic, and with a grouped into two rows with a ridge in between. An erect, narrow ligament is placed on the separating ridge. The shell structure of Tuarangia is noted for being composed of platy calcite sections in a zig-zag patterning. This is different from the shells of other Cambrian bivalves, which have a prismatic calcite shell and layers of carbonate nacre which similar to the laminar aragonite layer found in extant monoplacophora. The genus name is taken from the Maori word tuarangi, which means "ancient or of ancient date".

Tuarangia paparua is based on the holotype specimen, UCM 923, and the paratype specimens, UCM 924-UCM 931, all of which are housed in the University of Canterbury Geology Department. The fossils were found in sediments of the late middle Cambrian aged Tasman Formation which outcrops 1 kilometre (1,000 m) west of Cobb Reservoir in the Tasman Region, South Island, New Zealand. The specific epithet is from the Maori words papa, which translates as "shell", and rua, which means "two". The species would have lived along the coast of the paleocontinent Eastern Gondwana.

The second species of Tuarangia to be described, Tuarangia gravgaerdensis, is from sediments of the middle Cambrian aged Ardrarum Limestone Formation which outcrops on the island of Bornholm in the Baltic Sea. During the Cambrian Bornholm was a segment of ocean floor off the coast of the paleocontinet Baltica. The species was proposed by Berg-Madsen in 1987.

The family Tuarangiidae and the order Tuarangiida were first proposed by MacKinnon in his 1982 paper on the genus. Since that description, the superfamily Tuarangiacea, which MacKinnon also proposed has been dropped from use. Tuarangiidae is now placed directly into the order Tuarangiida and the order is placed into the bivalve evolutionary grade Euprotobranchia. This puts Tuarangiida as a sister taxon to the order Fordillida. Euprotobranchia includes the earliest confirmed crown group bivalves to have been described, with Tuarangia being one of only four accepted bivalve genera to have been described from the Cambrian, the other three being Fordilla, Pojetaia, and Camya.
