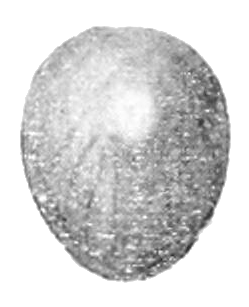
- Drawing of dorsal view of the shell of Scenella tenuistriata
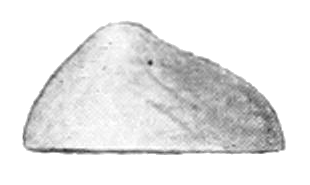
- Drawing of lateral view of the shell of Scenella tenuistriata

Scientific classification
- Domain: Eukaryota
- Kingdom: Animalia
- Phylum: Mollusca
- Family: †Scenellidae
- Genus: †Scenella
- Species: †S. tenuistriata

Binomial name
- †Scenella tenuistriata Chapman, 1911

= Scenella tenuistriata =

Scenella tenuistriata Temporal range: Middle Cambrian

Species of mollusc (fossil)

Scenella tenuistriata is an extinct species generally classified as a mollusc or hydrozoan in the family Scenellidae.

== Description ==
Scenella tenuistriata was originally discovered and described by Australian palaeontologist Frederick Chapman in 1911.

Chapman's original text (the type description) reads as follows:

Scenella tenuistpiata, sp. nov. (PI. LIX., Figs. 18 a, b).

Description. — Shell small, subconical; aperture ovate; apex eccentric, obtuse, slightly incurved towards the longer extremity. In side view boldly convex from apex to margin on shorter side; on longer side concave under the apex, then becoming convex and meeting apertural margin almost vertically. Surface relieved with a few delicate subradial striae inclined towards the longer side, otherwise smooth.

Dimensions. — Length, 2.75 mm.; width, 2.4 mm.; height, 1.6 mm.

Affinities. — Practically all the described species of the above genus are from the Middle Cambrian; but there is an undescribed species from the Upper Cambrian (Potsdam Sandstone) of Wisconsin mentioned by C. D. Walcott which may be at least allied with, our form, as that author compares it with (?) Scenella varians, a species from the Middle Cambrian of the United States and Canada, resembling our fossil in some particulars. The related genus Stenotheca occurs in the Cambrian of South Australia, and is distinguished from the above genus by its stronger, rugose shell and curved beak. The latter feature is not emphasised to any degree in our specimen, and the smoother shell shows it to be distinct from Stenotheca in that respect.

Horizon. — Upper Cambrian. Agnostus Zone. Dolodrook River.
