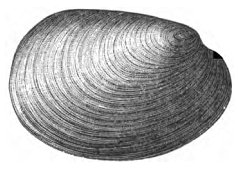
- Fordilla troyensis outer shell surface

Scientific classification
- Kingdom: Animalia
- Phylum: Mollusca
- Class: Bivalvia
- Order: †Fordillida
- Superfamily: †Fordilloidea; Pojeta, 1975

Families
- Fordillidae; Camyidae

= Fordilloidea =

Fordilloidea Temporal range: 520.0–513.0 Ma

Extinct superfamily of bivalves

Fordilloidea is an extinct superfamily of early bivalves containing two described families, Fordillidae and Camyidae, and the only superfamily in the order Fordillida. The superfamily is known from fossils of early to middle Cambrian age found in North America, Greenland, Europe, the Middle East, Asia, and Australia. Fordillidae currently contains two genera, Fordilla and Pojetaia, each with up to three described species while Camyidae only contains a single genus Camya with one described species, Camya asy. Due to the size and age of the fossil specimens, Fordillidae species are included as part of the Turkish Small shelly fauna.

== Description ==
Fordilla are small bivalves with valves that are equal in size and suboval in shape. In size, Fordilla specimens reach a total shell length of up to 4 millimetres (0.16 in) and a height of 25 millimetres (0.98 in). The shells are compressed laterally and the back edge is slightly broadened. The rear adductor is less developed and smaller than the front adductor, while the small pedal retractor muscle scar is positioned near the front adductor scar. The valve hinge is usually straight to slightly convexly curved and each valve will have at most one tooth present. The external surface of the shell occasionally shows faint ribbing.

Similar to Fordilla, species of Pojetaia are small, with valves to less than 2 millimetres (0.079 in) in length. Pojetaia species have an overall shape which is suboval, with the subequal valves slightly elongated. The ligament is straight with an umbo which is central to subcentral. In contrast to Fordilla, the rear adductor muscle was larger and more developed than the front adductor, with pallial muscles arranged along the valve margins. Also in contrast to Fordilla, valves of Pojetaia possess between one and three teeth, with up to two teeth per valve. The exteriors of the shells show faint ribbing and fine comarginal growth lines.

Camya is based on the fossils of two juvenile specimens which are both incomplete due to only the left valve of each being recovered. The valves have a distinct subtriangular shape and possess a long straight hinge. The umbo is positioned notably anterior on the shell and the beak is bracketed by two teeth of indistinctly pyramidal shape. The presence of the teeth was later questioned in a 1998 study by G. Geyer and M. Streng and cited the lack of preserved muscle scars as reason to suspect the placement of Camya asy in Bivalvia.

The inner shell layers of Fordilla and Pojetaia species both consist of layers of carbonate which is akin to the laminar aragonite layer found in extant monoplacophora. The structuring is similar to shell layering found in the extinct genera Anabarella and Watsonella which is thought to suggest members of the phylum Mollusca developed nacre independently several times. Of the four accepted bivalve genera to have been described from the Cambrian, Fordilloidea contains three, Camya, Fordilla, and Pojetaia, with the remaining genus Tuarangia in the possibly related order Tuarangiida.
