= Tichkaella =

Tichkaella Temporal range: Mid Cambrian

Scientific classification
- Domain: Eukaryota
- Kingdom: Animalia
- Phylum: Mollusca
- Class: †Helcionelloida
- Order: †Helcionelliformes
- Superfamily: †Helcionelloidea
- Genus: †Tichkaella

Extinct genus of molluscs

Tichkaella is a genus of helcionellid from the Middle Cambrian. It has a strongly spiralled, smooth shell with concentric ridges that have low relief. Other than its looser coiling, it is very similar to Protowenella.
