= Helcionella =

Helcionella Temporal range: Cambrian

Scientific classification
- Domain: Eukaryota
- Kingdom: Animalia
- Phylum: Mollusca
- Class: †Helcionelloida
- Order: †Helcionelliformes
- Family: †Helcionellidae
- Genus: †Helcionella; Grabau & Shimer, 1909

Species
- H. bella Feng et al.; H. emargina Cobbold, 1919; H. histosia Jacquet & Brock, 2016; H. oblonga Cobbold, 1921; (incomplete list)

Synonyms
- Pseudotheca Redlich 1899

Extinct genus of molluscs

Helcionella is a genus of helcionellid, a fossil marine invertebrate animal that is considered to be a mollusk and may possibly be a gastropod. The shells of these animals are about a centimetre in size. The tip of the shell extends beyond the rear extremity of the shell's aperture, and the shell is "endogastric" in shape.

Helcionella is the type genus of the family Helcionellidae.
