= Lamaureriella =

Lamaureriella Temporal range: Lower Ordovician

Scientific classification
- Domain: Eukaryota
- Kingdom: Animalia
- Phylum: Mollusca
- Class: †Helcionelloida
- Order: †Helcionelliformes
- Family: †Helcionellidae
- Genus: †Lamaureriella
- Species: †L. vizcainoi

Binomial name
- †Lamaureriella vizcainoi Peel & Horný, 2004

Genus of invertebrates

Lamaureriella is a genus of laterally-flattened curled helcionellid known from Lower Ordovician deposits. The majority of the hundreds of known specimens come from a single concretion. The specimens are on the scale of millimetres; they bear unusual flanges ("plications") on their sides.
