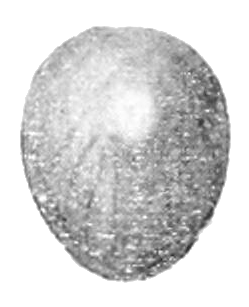
- Dorsal view of the shell of Scenella tenuistriata
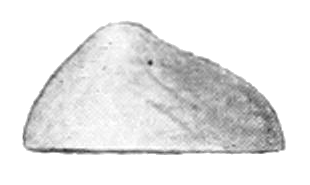
- Lateral view of the shell of Scenella tenuistriata

Scientific classification
- Kingdom: Animalia
- Phylum: Mollusca
- Class: incertae sedis
- Family: †Scenellidae
- Genus: †Scenella; Billings, 1872

Synonyms
- Helcionellinae Wenz, 1938; Hampilinae Kobayashi, 1958; Securiconidae Missarzhevsky, 1989

= Scenella =

Scenella Temporal range: Cambrian Stage 3–Late Ordovician

Genus of molluscs (fossil)

Scenella is an extinct genus of fossil invertebrate animal which is generally considered to be a mollusc; at various times it has been suggested that this genus belongs with the gastropods, the monoplacophorans, or the helcionellids, although no firm association with any of these classes has been established. An affinity with the hydrozoa (as a flotation device) has been considered, although some authors oppose this hypothesis. A gastropod affinity is defended on the basis of six pairs of internal muscle scars, whilst the serially-repeated nature of these scars suggests to other authors a monoplacophoran affinity. However the specimens showing this scarring have not been convincingly shown to belong to the genus Scenella. A similarity to the Ediacaran Ovatoscutum has also been drawn.

== Description ==
The shell of Scenella is elongated along its anterior-posterior axis, and comprises concentric rings around a conical central peak. Radial and concentric corrugations exist in some species. Some specimens are preserved as organic films, others appear to have been infilled with calcite. They are usually preserved point-upwards, with their long axes consistently oriented; this probably represents their most stable position under their depositional current. Soft parts have never been reported in association with Scenella, suggesting that the preserved fragments separated quickly from the associated tissue prior to burial.

== Fossil occurrence ==
Scenella lived from the Cambrian to the Ordovician. Its remains have been found in Antarctica, Asia, Europe, and North America. Individual fossils are common throughout the Burgess Shale, where they often occur in dense aggregations. Where they overlap, specimens deform as by draping. Specimens are sometimes cracked or torn, with margins often damaged by folding or "tattering". 1206 specimens of Scenella are known from the Greater Phyllopod bed, where they comprise 2.29% of the community.

== Taxonomy ==
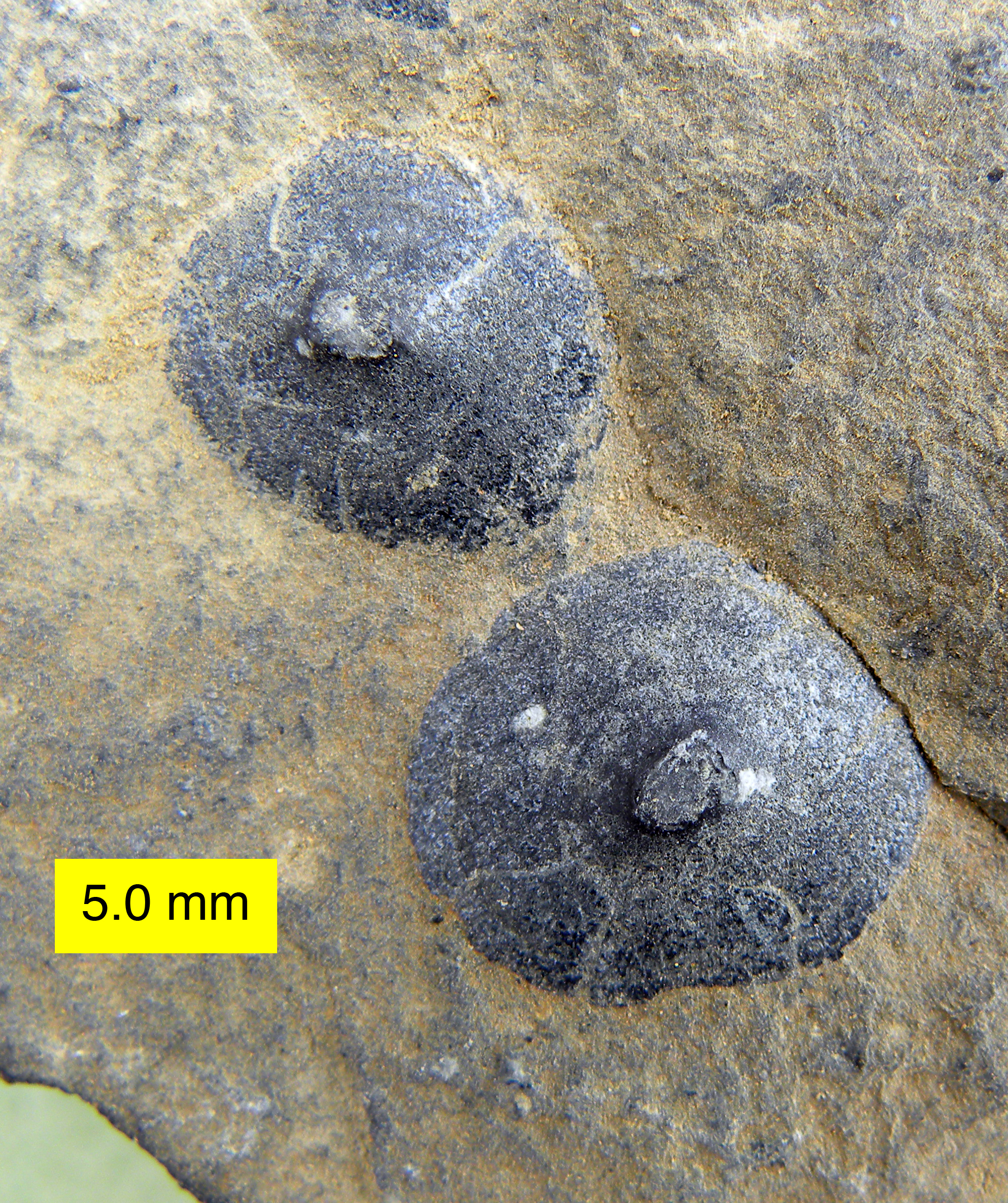
Scenella from the Burgess Shale, Middle Cambrian, Walcott Quarry, near Field, British Columbia

Scenella is the type genus of the family Scenellidae.

The taxonomy of the Gastropoda by Bouchet & Rocroi, 2005 categorizes Scenellidae in the superfamilia Scenelloidea within the Paleozoic molluscs of uncertain systematic position.

== Species ==
Species in the genus Scenella include:

Species	Authority	Range
Scenella affinis	Ulrich and Schfield, 1897	
Scenella amii	(Matthew, 1902) Babcock and Robinson 1988	Burgess Shale (Mid Cambrian, 508 million years ago)
Scenella anomala	(Billings, 1865) Wagner 2008	
Scenella augusta	(Billings, 1865) Wagner 2008	
Scenella barrandei	(Linnarsson, 1879) (Bergerg-Madsen and Peel, 1986)	
Scenella beloitensis	Ulrich and Scofield (1897)	
Scenella clotho	Walcott, 1936	
Scenella compressa	Ulrich and Scofield (1897)	
Scenella conica	Whiteaves, 1884	
Scenella conula	(Walcott, 1884)	
Scenella conicum	(Whitfield, 1886) Ulrich and Scofield (1897)	
Scenella hujingtanensis	Yu, 1979	
Scenella magnifica	Ulrich and Scofield (1897)	
S.? mira	Vasil’yeva, 1994	
Scenella montrealensis	Billings (1865)	
Scenella obtusa	(Sardeson, 1892) Ulrich and Scofield (1897)	
Scenella orithyia	(Billings, 1865) Ulrich and Scofield (1897)	
Scenella pretensa	Raymond, 1905	
Scenella radialis	Ulrich and Scofield (1897)	
Scenella radians	Babcock & Robinson	
Scenella radiata	Yu, 1979	
Scenella reticulata	(Billings, 1872) (type)	
Scenella retusa	(Ford, 1873)	
Scenella unicarinata	(Kobayashi, 1934) Wagner 2008	
Scenella varians	Walcott 1908	
Scenella venillia	(Billings, 1865) Wagner 2008	
Scenella tenuistriata	Chapman, 1911	Mid Cambrian
