= Barskovia =

Barskovia Temporal range: Terreneuvian

Scientific classification
- Domain: Eukaryota
- Kingdom: Animalia
- Phylum: Mollusca
- Class: †Helcionelloida
- Order: †Khairkhaniiformes
- Family: †Khairkhaniidae
- Genus: †Barskovia

Extinct genus of molluscs

Barskovia is a torted conical shell known from earliest Cambrian small skeletal fossils, interpreted as a helcionelloid.

It has been found fossilized in the Platonovskaya Formation in Siberia. Due to its position in a deep layer of this rock formation, Barskovia is estimated to have occurred 541 million years ago at earliest.
