= Trenella =

Scientific classification
- Kingdom: Animalia
- Phylum: Mollusca
- Class: †Helcionelloida
- Order: †Helcionelliformes
- Family: †Trenellidae
- Genus: †Trenella; Parkhaev, 2001

Extinct genus of molluscs

Trenella is the sole genus in the Trenellidae, an extinct family of paleozoic Yochelcionellids.

== 2005 taxonomy ==
The taxonomy of the Gastropoda by Bouchet & Rocroi, 2005 categorizes Trenellidae in the superfamilia Yochelcionelloidea within the Paleozoic molluscs of uncertain systematic position. This family has no subfamilies.

== 2006-2007 taxonomy ==
According to P. Yu. Parkhaev, the family Trenellidae is in the superfamily Yochelcionelloidea Runnegar & Jell, 1976 within the order Helcionelliformes Golikov & Starobogatov, 1975, subclass Archaeobranchia Parkhaev, 2001, class Helcionelloida Peel, 1991.

== Genera ==
Genera in the family Trenellidae include:

- Trenella Parkhaev, 2001 - type genus of the family Trenellidae
