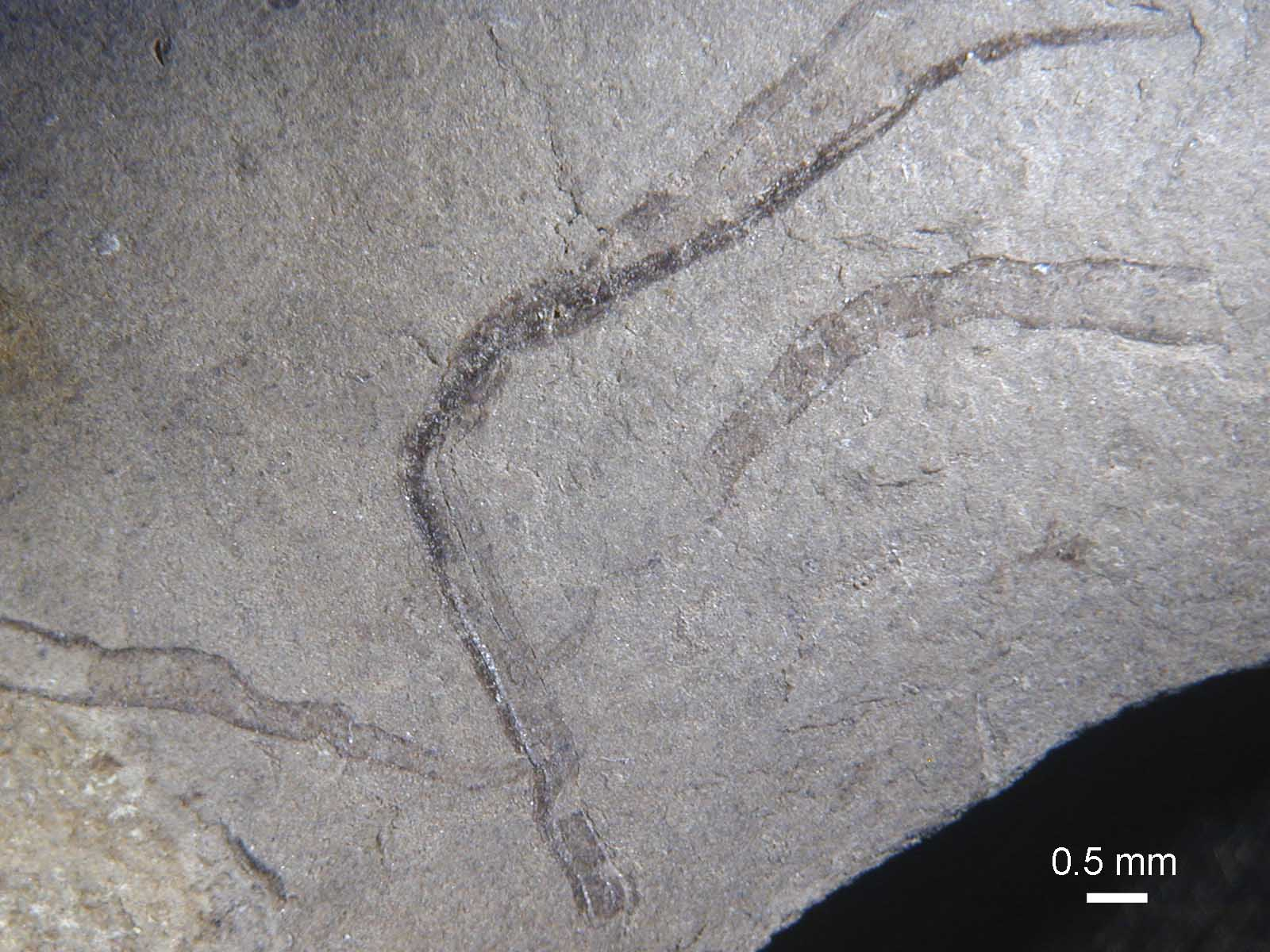
- Torellella toolsensis (POPOV & KHAZANOVICH, 1989), Toolse River, North East Estonia, Maardu Formation, Upper Cambrian.

Scientific classification
- Domain: Eukaryota
- Kingdom: Animalia
- Phylum: incertae sedis
- Order: †Hyolithelmintida
- Family: †Torellellidae
- Genus: †Torellella; Holm, 1893

Species
- See text

= Torellella =

Torellella Temporal range: Cambrian

Extinct genus of problematic fossils

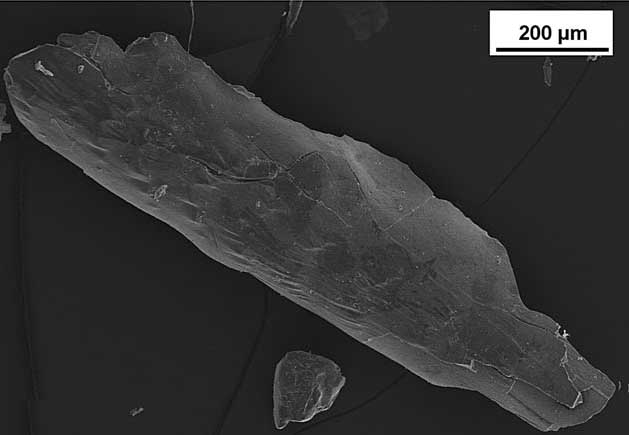
Torellella sulcata (MISSARZHEVSKY, 1982), Jägala, North Estonia, Ülgase Formation, Upper Cambrian.

Torellella is a genus of problematic tubicolous fossils. They have slightly conical, phosphatic tubes with elliptical cross-section. Their fossils are known from the Cambrian.
