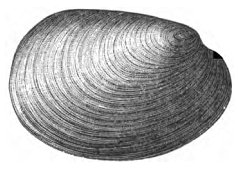
- Fordilla troyensis outer shell surface

Scientific classification
- Kingdom: Animalia
- Phylum: Mollusca
- Class: Bivalvia
- Order: †Fordillida
- Superfamily: †Fordilloidea
- Family: †Fordillidae; Pojeta, 1975

Genera
- Fordilla; Pojetaia

= Fordillidae =

Fordillidae Temporal range: Tommotian–early Middle Cambrian

Extinct family of bivalves

Fordillidae is an extinct family of early bivalves and one of two families in the extinct superfamily Fordilloidea. The family is known from fossils of early to middle Cambrian age found in North America, Greenland, Europe, the Middle East, Asia, and Australia. The family currently contains two genera, Fordilla and Pojetaia, each with up to three described species. Due to the size and age of the fossil specimens, Fordillidae species are included as part of the Turkish Small shelly fauna.

== Description ==
Fordilla are small bivalves with valves that are equal in size and suboval in shape. In size Fordilla specimens reach a total shell length of up to 4 millimetres (0.16 in) and a height of 25 millimetres (0.98 in). The shells are compressed laterally and the back edge is slightly broadened. The rear adductor is less developed and smaller than the front adductor, while the small pedal retractor muscle scar is positioned near the front adductor scar. The valve hinge is usually straight to slightly convexly curved and each valve will have at most one tooth present. The external surface of the shell occasionally show faint ribbing.

Similar to Fordilla, species of Pojetaia are small, with valves to less than 2 millimetres (0.079 in) in length. Pojetaia species have an overall shape which is suboval, with the subequal valves slightly elongated. The ligament is straight with an umbo which is central to subcentral. In contrast to Fordilla the rear adductor muscle was larger and more developed then the front adductor, with pallial muscles arranged along the valve margins. Also in contrast to Fordilla, valves of Pojetaia possess between one and three teeth, with up to two teeth per valve. The exteriors of the shells show faint ribbing and fine comarginal growth lines.

The inner shell layers of Fordilla and Pojetaia species both consist of layers of carbonate, which is akin to the laminar aragonite layer found in extant monoplacophora. The structuring is similar to shell layering found in the extinct genera Anabarella and Watsonella which is thought to suggest that members of the phylum Mollusca developed nacre independently several times.
