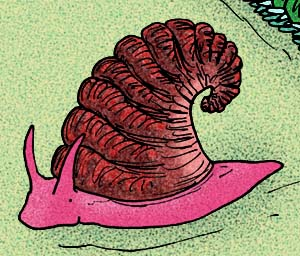
- A reconstruction of Latouchella costata

Scientific classification
- Kingdom: Animalia
- Phylum: Mollusca
- Class: †Helcionelloida
- Order: †Helcionelliformes
- Family: †Coreospiridae
- Genus: †Latouchella; Cobbold, 1921

Type species
- †Latouchella costata Cobbold, 1921

Species
- See text.

Synonyms
- Archaeospira Yü 1979; Cambroconus Yu 1981; Gibbaspira He 1984; Huanglingella Chen et al. 1981; Hubeispira Yu 1981; Reticulatoconus; Uncinaspira He 1984; Yunanospira Yü 1979; Yunnanospira Jian 1980

= Latouchella =

Latouchella Temporal range: 541–498.5 Ma Tommotian

Extinct genus of molluscs

Latouchella is an extinct genus of marine invertebrate animal, that is considered to be a mollusk and which may be a sea snail, a gastropod. It is a helcionellid from the Tommotian epoch of what is now Siberia. Its tightly coiled, spiral shell contains a number of low "walls" running up the front surface of the interior; these would have directed water currents within its shell. Between these walls are a series of furrows, parallel to the shell's aperture, giving casts of the internal structure the appearance of a railway line, with sleepers (created by furrows) tying together paired rails that run towards the apex of the shell.

It was named by Edgar Sterling Cobbold in 1921 for the Rev. William Martin Digues La Touche of Wistanstow, Shropshire, England, in whose collection it was found.

== Description ==
This genus had a curved, segmented shell, and it is often reconstructed as a snail-like creature.

== Older taxonomy ==
The taxonomy of the genus Latouchella was originally like this: class Helcionelloida, order Helcionellida, superfamily Helcionelloidea, family Helcionellidae.

== 2005 taxonomy ==
The taxonomy of the Gastropoda by Bouchet & Rocroi, 2005 categorizes Latouchella in the family Coreospiridae in the superfamily Scenelloidea within the Paleozoic molluscs of uncertain systematic position.

Latouchella was a type genus in the family Latouchellidae Golikov & Starobogatov, 1989, however Latouchellidae is a synonym of Coreospiridae.

== 2006-2007 taxonomy ==
The 2006–2007 taxonomy of the genus Latouchella is like this: class Helcionelloida, subclass Archaeobranchia, order Helcionelliformes, superfamily Helcionelloidea, family Coreospiridae.

== Species ==
Species in the genus Latouchella include:

- Latouchella costata (type)
- L. accordionata
- L. adelocosma
- L. adunca
- L. alicae
- L. arcuata
- L. arguta
- L. burlingi
- L. dimicostata
- L. holmdalense
- L. iacobinica
- L. korobokovi
- L. merino
- L. ostenfeldense
- L. pearylandica
- L. pocatelloensis
- L. sonlingpoensis
- L. taijiangensis
- ? Latouchella memorabilis Missarzhevsky in Rozanov et al., 1969
- ? Latouchella orientalis

== See also ==
- Yochelcionella

== Notes ==
- Gubanov, Alexander P.; Peel, John S.. Redescription of the type species of Latouchella Cobbold, 1921 (Mollusca) from the Lower Cambrian of Comley, England. GFF 1998 03.
- Gubanov, Alexander P.; Peel, John S.. Oelandiella, the earliest Cambrian helcionelloid mollusc from Siberia. Palaeontology April 1999.
- Brock, Glenn A.. Middle Cambrian molluscs from the southern New England Fold Belt, New South Wales, Australia. Geobios 1998.
- Runnegar, Bruce; Jell, Peter A.. Australian Middle Cambrian molluscs and their bearing on early molluscan evolution. Alcheringa: An Australasian Journal of Palaeontology 1976 01.
- E.S. Cobbold. 1921. The Cambrian horizons of Comley (Shropshire) and their Brachiopoda, Pteropoda, Gasteropoda and etc. Quarterly Journal of the Geological Society of London 76:325-386
