= Y. gracilis =

Y. gracilis may refer to:

- Yochelcionella gracilis, a mollusc species from the lower Cambrian of North America in the genus Yochelcionella
- Youngia gracilis, a plant species in the genus Youngia

== See also ==
- Gracilis (disambiguation)
