= Wilfrid Chapman =

British botanist (1891–1955)

Wilfrid Chapman FIE
- Born: Wilfrid Disney Chapman; 16 May 1891; Wandsworth, London
- Died: 6 May 1955 (aged 63)
- Education: University of Melbourne
- Occupations: Engineer, soldier, photographer, and botanist
- Spouse: Marea Feori Anastasia Maniachi (m. 1919)
- Children: 1
- Parents: Frederick Chapman (father); Helen Mary Chapman (née Dancer) (mother)

Brigadier Wilfrid Disney Chapman FIE (16 May 1891 – 6 May 1955) was an engineer, soldier, photographer, and botanist after whom Eucalyptus chapmaniana was named.

== Early years ==
Chapman was born on 16 May 1891 at Wandsworth, London, the son of Frederick Chapman, a geologist's assistant, and his wife Helen Mary, née Dancer. In 1902 the family came to Australia where Frederick took up appointment as paleontologist at the National Museum, Melbourne, and served as the first Australian Commonwealth Palaeontologist from 1927 to 1935.

== Career ==
=== First World War ===
Wilfred Chapman enlisted with the Australian Army on 7 June 1915 and saw active duty in Egypt and France during World War I. He was appointed as a commissioned officer on 29 September 1917 and saw further service in France before being discharged on 31 July 1919, at the conclusion of the war.

=== Inter-war years ===
Chapman married Marea Feori Anastasia Maniachi on 13 December 1919 at the Collins Street Independent Church, Melbourne, a Congregational church. Employed by the Victorian Railways construction branch, he graduated for the University of Melbourne with a bachelor of civil engineering in 1923 and gained his master's degree in engineering in 1925. An early pioneer in the use of electric-arc welding for structural purposes, Chapman joined E.M.F. Electric Co. Pty Ltd as engineer in charge of research and development in 1931.

=== Second World War ===
Chapman was called up for part-time duty on 1 January 1940. He was appointed to the rank of Lieutenant Colonel in the Australia Army, and commanded the 2nd/2nd Army Field Workshop which he took to Palestine. Promoted to the rank of Colonel where he served as the chief ordnance mechanical engineer at A.I.F. Headquarters, Chapman made some important innovations in the design of mobile workshops and was mentioned in dispatches. In January 1943 he was appointed as chief superintendent of design and promoted as temporary brigadier in August of that year. In November 1945 he transferred to the Reserve of Officers as an honorary brigadier.

=== Subsequent career ===
Following the conclusion of the war, in 1946 Chapman joined the Commonwealth Department of Transport as director of civil engineering in the railway standardisation division. He was elected as vice-chairman of the Australian Standards Association in 1946. Chapman was one of three distinguished engineers upon whom the University of Western Australia conferred a doctorate of engineering honoris causa in 1949 – a distinction in which he took such pride that he thereafter styled himself Dr Chapman.

== Death ==
Chapman died on 6 May 1955 at Mount St Evin's Hospital, Fitzroy; survived by his wife and son, Wilfrid Alexander Maniarchi Chapman.
