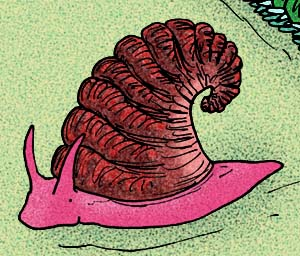
- Latouchella costata, reconstructed as a snail

Scientific classification
- Kingdom: Animalia
- Phylum: Mollusca
- Class: incertae sedis
- Superfamily: †Scenelloidea
- Family: †Coreospiridae; Knight, 1947

Genera
- See text

Synonyms
- Archaeospiridae Yu, 1979; Yangtzespirinae Yu, 1984; Latouchellidae Golikov & Starobogatov, 1989

= Coreospiridae =

Coreospiridae Temporal range: Early Cambrian

Extinct family of molluscs

Coreospiridae is an extinct family of Paleozoic molluscs of uncertain position taxonomically. They might be snails (Gastropoda), Helcionelloida, or they might be Monoplacophora.

== 2005 taxonomy ==
The taxonomy of the Gastropoda by Bouchet & Rocroi, 2005 categorizes Coreospiridae in the superfamily Scenelloidea within the Paleozoic molluscs of uncertain systematic position.

== 2006–2007 taxonomy ==
According to P. Yu. Parkhaev, the family Coreospiridae is in the family Helcionelloidea (Wenz, 1938) in the order Helcionelliformes (Golikov & Starobogatov, 1975) within the subclass Archaeobranchia (Parkhaev, 2001) in the class Helcionelloida (Peel, 1991).

== Genera ==
Genera in the family Coreospiridae include:

- Coreospira Saito, 1936 - type genus of the family Coreospiridae
- Latouchella
- Owenella Ulrich & Scofield, 1897
  - Owenella antiquata (Whitfield, 1878) - synonym: Bellerophon antiquata Whitfield, 1878
