= Comley =

Hamlet in Shropshire, England

Coordinates: 52.564°N 2.760°W

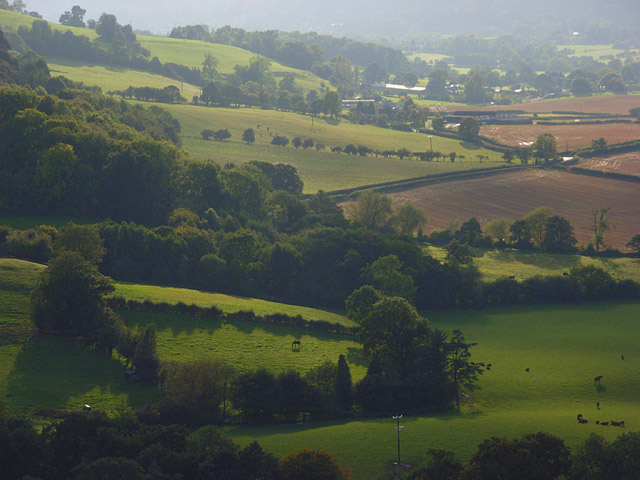
- View towards Comley, from The Lawley hill

- Location within Shropshire
- OS grid reference: SO484965
  - London: 158 miles (254 km)
- Civil parish: Cardington
- Unitary authority: Shropshire
- Ceremonial county: Shropshire
- Region: West Midlands
- Country: England
- Sovereign state: United Kingdom
- Post town: CHURCH STRETTON
- Postcode district: SY6
- Dialling code: 01694
- Police: West Mercia
- Fire: Shropshire
- Ambulance: West Midlands
- UK Parliament: Shrewsbury and Atcham

Comley is a hamlet in Shropshire, England. It is near the A49 road, to the northeast of Church Stretton.

It is situated between two prominent hills: Caer Caradoc to the south and The Lawley to the north. The elevation of the hamlet is around 200 metres (660 ft) above sea level.

The hamlet is largely in the civil parish of Cardington, but Comley Farm is just within Longnor.

Shropshire Wildlife Trust have a nature reserve in the former Comley Quarry.

== See also ==
- Comley limestone
