= Anabarella =

Anabarella Temporal range: Lower Cambrian

Scientific classification
- Kingdom: Animalia
- Phylum: Mollusca
- Class: †Helcionelloida
- Order: †Helcionelliformes
- Family: †Helcionellidae
- Genus: †Anabarella

Species
- A. plana Vostokova, 1962; A. australis

Synonyms
- Planutenia

Extinct genus of molluscs

Anabarella is a species of bilaterally-flattened monoplacophoran mollusc, with a morphological similarity to the rostroconchs. Its shell preserves evidence of three mineralogical textures on its outer surface: it is polygonal near the crest of the shell, subsequently changing to both spiny and stepwise. Its internal microstructure is calcitic and semi-nacreous. Its name reflects its provenance from Anabar, Siberia. It has been interpreted as ancestral to the rostroconchs, and has been aligned to the Helcionellidae.

The genus is closely related to Watsonella, with which it bears many morphological similarities, including a laminar internal shell microstructure said to connect it with the early bivalves Fordilla and Pojetaia.
