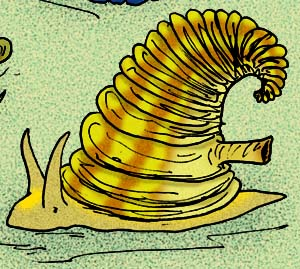
- Yochelcionella cyrano

Scientific classification
- Domain: Eukaryota
- Kingdom: Animalia
- Phylum: Mollusca
- Class: †Helcionelloida
- Order: †Helcionelliformes
- Superfamily: †Yochelcionelloidea; Runnegar & Jell, 1976

= Yochelcionelloidea =

Yochelcionelloidea Temporal range: Lower Cambrian–Mid Cambrian

Extinct superfamily of molluscs

Yochelcionelloidea is an extinct superfamily of paleozoic molluscs of uncertain position (Gastropoda or Monoplacophora). The earliest yochelcionellids are known from the Middle Tommotian, but they are most diverse from the Botomian through the early Middle Cambrian.

== 2005 taxonomy ==
The taxonomy of the Gastropoda by Bouchet & Rocroi, 2005:

Yochelcionelloidea

- † Yochelcionellidae
- † Stenothecidae
- † Trenellidae

== 2006-2007 taxonomy ==
According to the opinion of P. Yu. Parkhaev is in the class Helcionelloida, subclass Archaeobranchia Parkhaev, 2001, Order Helcionelliformes Golikov & Starobogatov, 1975:

- Superfamily Yochelcionelloidea Runnegar & Jell, 1976

- Family Trenellidae Parkhaev, 2001
- Family Yochelcionellidae Runnegar & Jell, 1976
- Family Stenothecidae Runnegar & Jell, 1980

- Subfamily Stenothecinae Runnegar & Jell, 1980
- Subfamily Watsonellinae Parkhaev, 2001
