= Comley Limestone =

- Stratigraphic range: 519-509 Ma

Location
- Location: Comley, Shropshire, UK

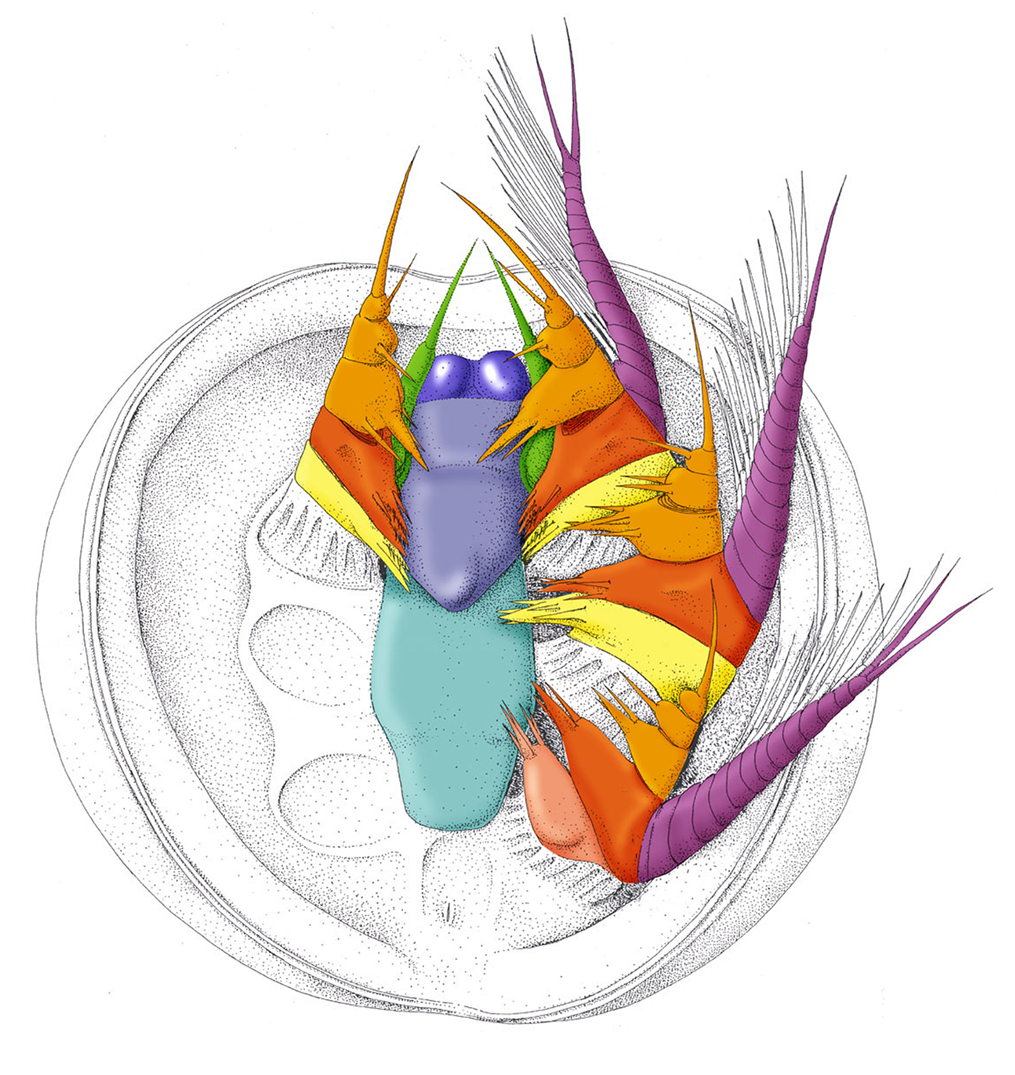
Drawing of Klausmuelleria a fossil phosphatocopine arthropod known from the unit

The Comley Limestone is an Early Cambrian Lagerstätte exposed in Comley, Shropshire, England. It is known for its phosphatic microfossils, which can be extracted by acid maceration and are preserved in three dimensions in a similar fashion to the Orsten fossils. It represents around 10 million years of deposition, and was deposited from 519 to 501 million years ago. Fossils from the formation include the phosphatocopine arthropod Klausmuelleria.

== See also ==
- Geology of Shropshire
