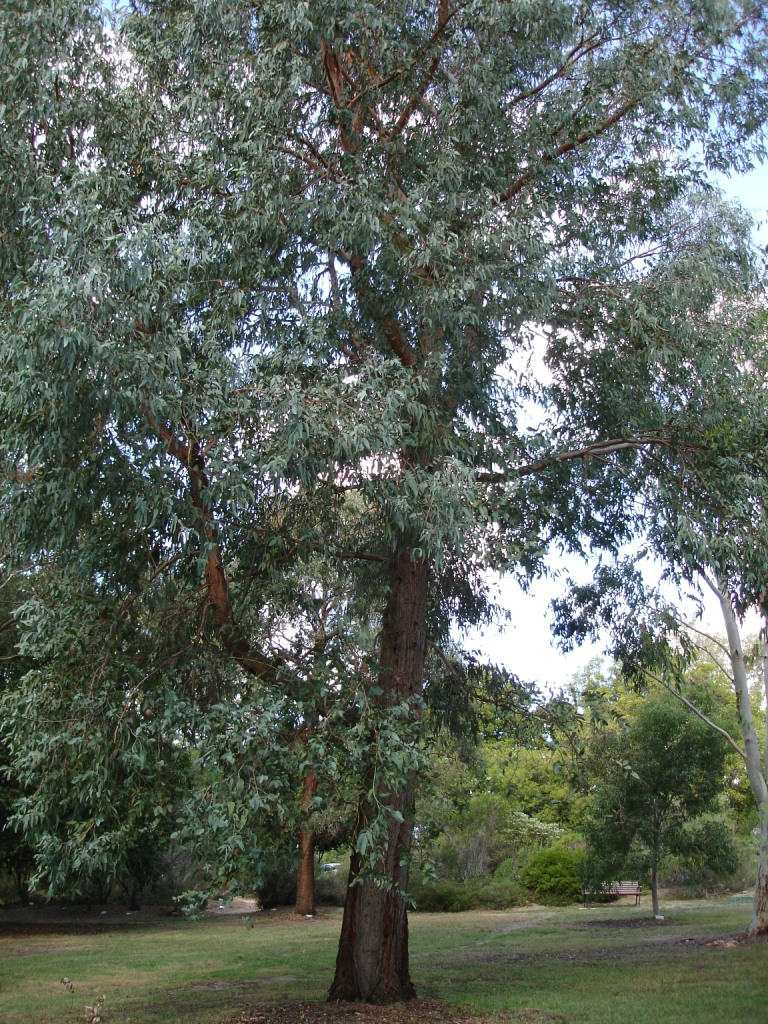
- Eucalyptus chapmaniana in Maranoa Gardens

Scientific classification
- Kingdom: Plantae
- Clade: Tracheophytes
- Clade: Angiosperms
- Clade: Eudicots
- Clade: Rosids
- Order: Myrtales
- Family: Myrtaceae
- Genus: Eucalyptus
- Species: E. chapmaniana

Binomial name
- Eucalyptus chapmaniana Cameron

= Eucalyptus chapmaniana =

Bogong gum

Species of eucalyptus

Eucalyptus chapmaniana, commonly known as the Bogong gum, is a species of small to medium-sized tree endemic to montane and eastern Australia. It has rough, fibrous and fissured bark on most of the trunk and smooth light brown to grey bark often shed in long ribbons on the branches. The adult leaves are lance-shaped to curved, the flower buds in groups of three and the fruit a conical or bell-shaped capsule.

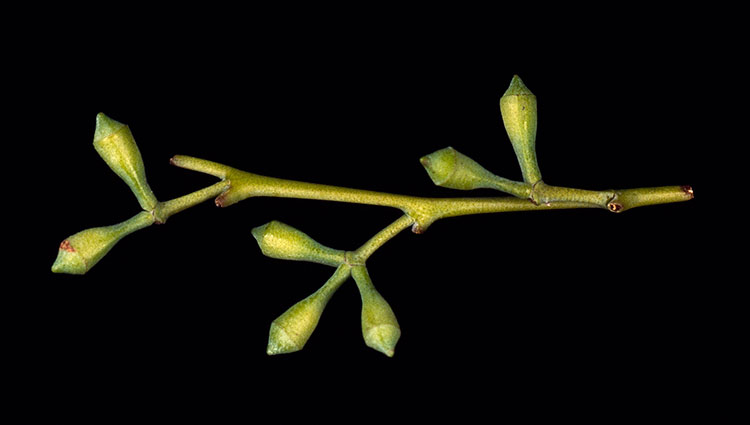
buds

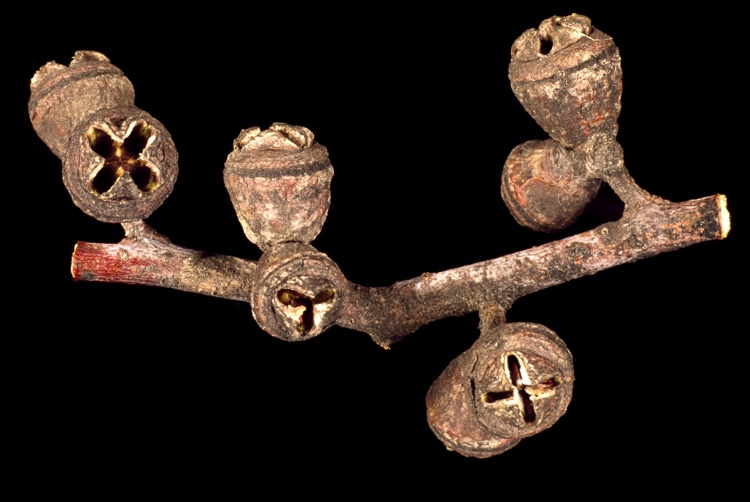
fruit

== Description ==
Eucalyptus chapmaniana is a tree that typically grows to a height of 30–35 m (98–115 ft) and forms a lignotuber. The bark on most of the trunk is rough, fibrous and finely and grey or brown-grey and on the branches is smooth, light brown to pale grey, with long ribbons of shed bark. Young plants and copice regrowth have sessile egg-shaped to almost round leaves 20–95 mm (0.79–3.74 in) long and 18–70 mm (0.71–2.76 in) wide arranged in opposite pairs. Adult leaves are arranged alternately, lance-shaped to curved, 140–300 mm (5.5–11.8 in) long and 17–48 mm (0.67–1.89 in) wide on a petiole 13–37 mm (0.51–1.46 in) long. The flower buds are arranged in groups of three in leaf axils on an unbranched peduncle 5–9 mm (0.20–0.35 in) long, the individual buds on a pedicel 2–3 mm (0.079–0.118 in) long. Mature buds are club-shaped to diamond-shaped, 7–9 mm (0.28–0.35 in) long and 5–7 mm (0.20–0.28 in) wide with a conical to beaked operculum. Flowering occurs from January to March and the flowers are white. The fruit is a woody, conical or bell-shaped capsule 5–9 mm (0.20–0.35 in) long and 7–10 mm (0.28–0.39 in) wide.

== Taxonomy ==
Eucalyptus chapmaniana was first formally described in 1947 by Alexander Kenneth Cameron from a specimen near Bogong and the description was published in The Victorian Naturalist. The specific epithet (chapmanii) honours Wilfrid Chapman (1891–1955), after he had drawn attention to the existence of this species.

== Distribution and habitat ==
Bogong gum grows in wet forest and grassy or shrubby woodland, often on steep slopes, in cold mountains areas of Victoria and far southeastern New South Wales. In Victoria it occurs along the highest parts of the Great Dividing Range between Jamieson and Benambra and is also found on Mount Buffalo and Pine Mountain. In New South Wales it is only found south of Khancoban.

== Gallery ==
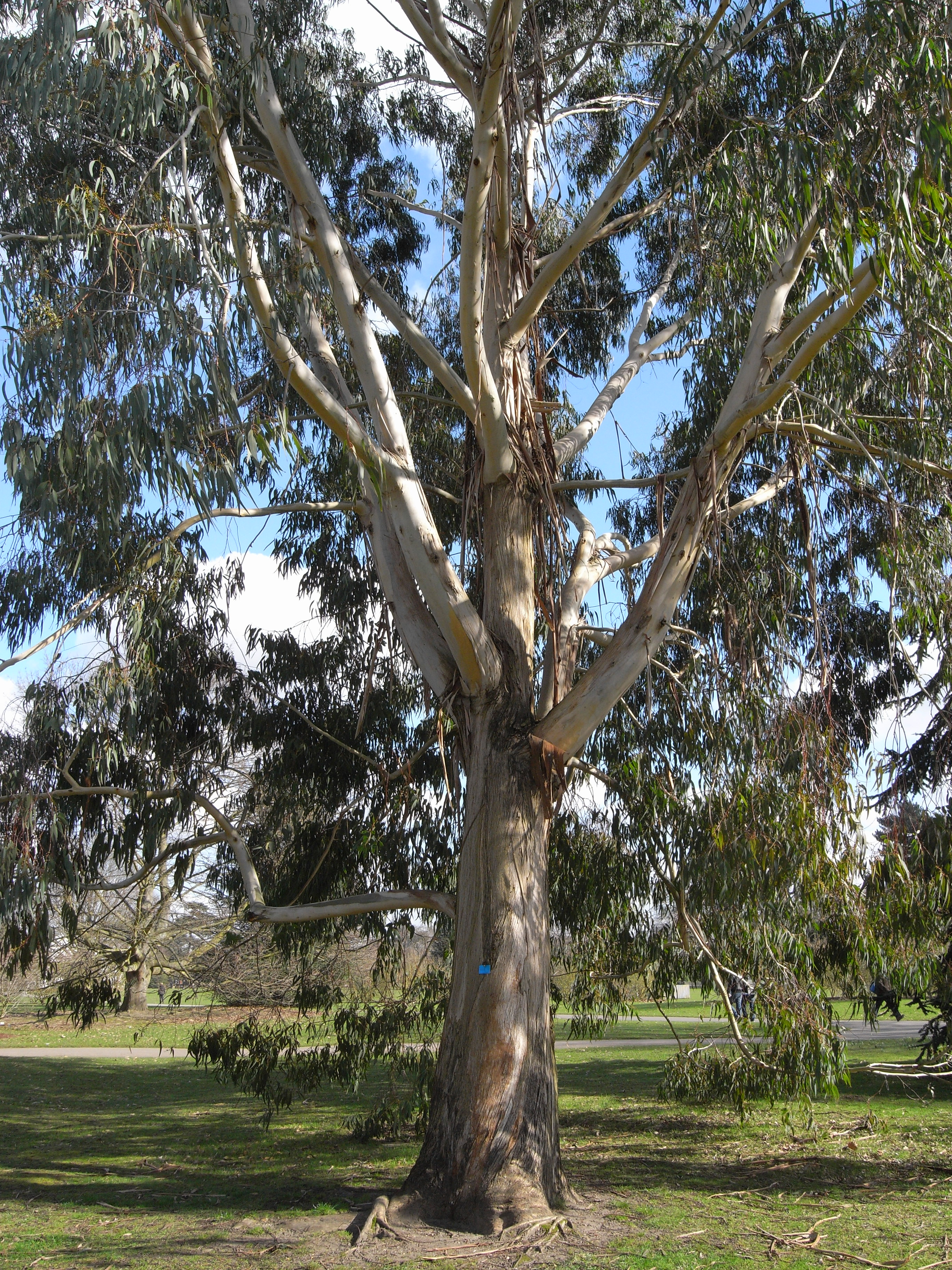
Eucalyptus chapmaniana in Kew Gardens

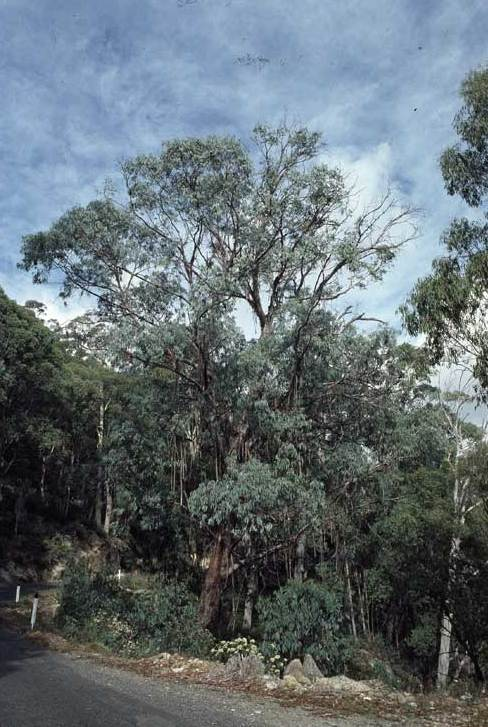
Eucalyptus chapmaniana on Mount Buffalo

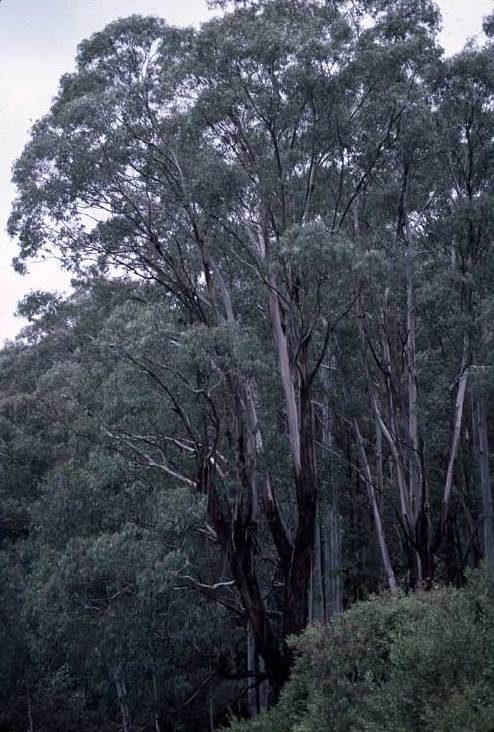
Eucalyptus chapmaniana near Bogong
