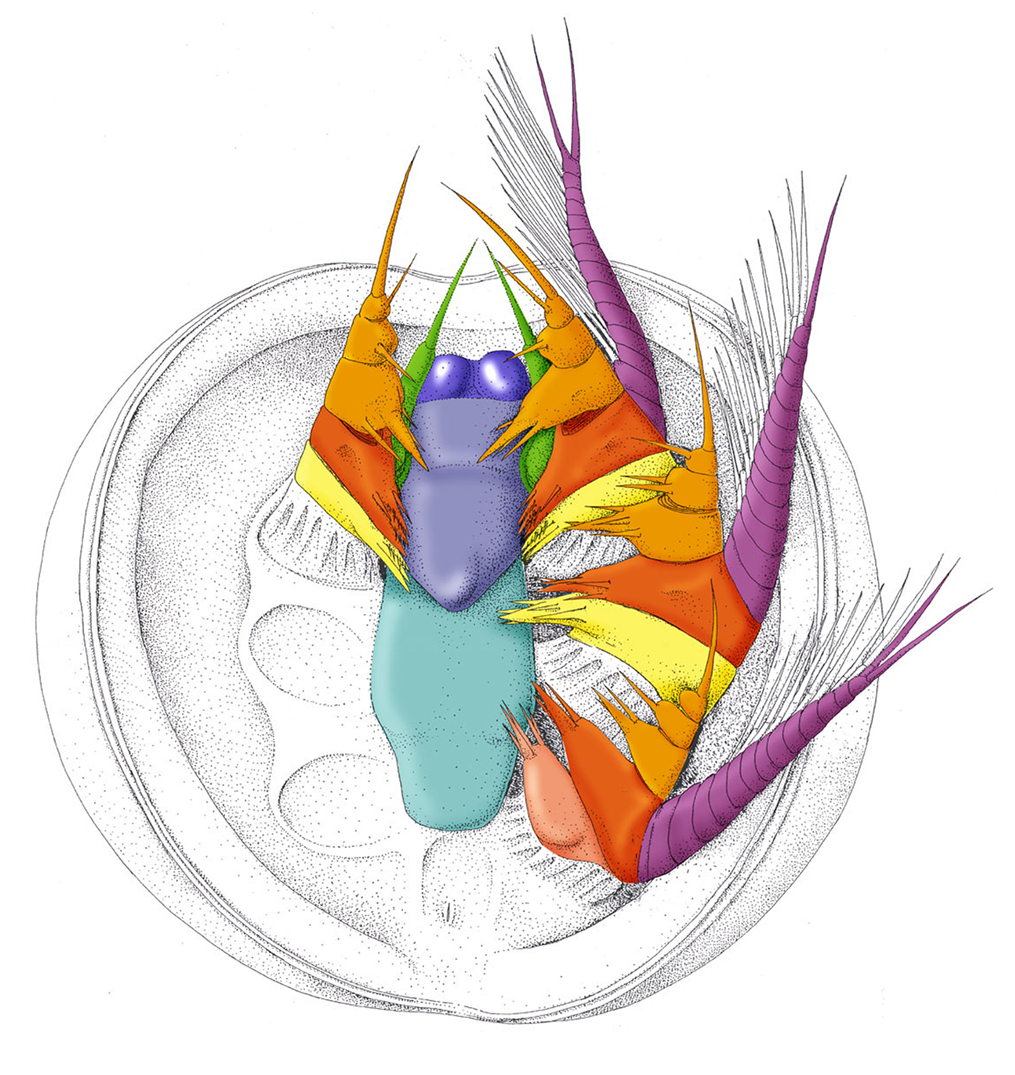
- Reconstruction of Klausmuelleria, ventral view

Scientific classification
- Kingdom: Animalia
- Phylum: Arthropoda
- Clade: †Phosphatocopina
- Genus: †Klausmuelleria; Siveter, Williams & Waloszek, 2001
- Species: †K. salopensis

Binomial name
- †Klausmuelleria salopensis Siveter, Williams & Waloszek, 2001

= Klausmuelleria =

Klausmuelleria Temporal range: Cambrian Stage 3

Extinct genus of phosphatocopine

Klausmuelleria is an extinct genus of Cambrian phosphatocopines from the Comley Limestone of the United Kingdom. The genus contains a single species, Klausmuelleria salopensis.

== Description ==
Klausmuelleria is roughly 340 micrometers long, with two specimens known. The head shield is univalve with a gape of 80°, alongside convex halves. The antennulae are small, with only a singular seta preserved. The second antennae are larger, with gnathobases, a large first podomere, a long endite on the endopod, alongside annuli with setae. The mandible and first maxilla are both similar, although increasingly smaller, with slight differences in the structure of the spines. The first maxilla's exopod is somewhat different with the spines starting further up the structure than the mandible. The labrum is triangular with curved sides, with the possible position of eyes and the mouth obscured by matrix. The sternum is initially similar in width to the labrum, before curving and widening at its midpoint. The trunk is mostly obscured by matrix as well, although it is soft, and a slit-shaped fold may be the anus. Klausmuelleria shares similarities with the earliest known instars of other phosphatocopines, both lacking a tail and of similar size. A possible third specimen with a much wider labrum and narrower sternum may also be known, however its position is dubious due to lack of soft tissue.

== Etymology ==
Klausmuelleria honours the discoverer of the Orsten, Klaus Müller. The species name derives from Salop, the Roman name for Shropshire, the location the fossil is from.
