= Khairkhaniidae =

Scientific classification
- Kingdom: Animalia
- Phylum: Mollusca
- Class: †Helcionelloida
- Subclass: †Divasibranchia
- Order: †Khairkhaniiformes
- Family: †Khairkhaniidae; Missarzhevsky, 1989

Genera
- See text

Extinct family of molluscs

Khairkhaniidae is an extinct family of Paleozoic fossil molluscs of uncertain position. They are thought to belong to either the Gastropoda or Monoplacophora. They possess planispiral coiled shells with a columnar microstructure.

== 2005 taxonomy ==
The taxonomy of the Gastropoda by Bouchet & Rocroi, 2005 categorizes Khairkhaniidae within the Paleozoic molluscs of uncertain systematic position. This family is unassigned to superfamily. This family has no subfamilies.

== 2006–2007 taxonomy ==
According to the P. Yu. Parkhaev, the Khairkhaniidae is the only family in the order Khairkhaniifomes within the subclass Divasibranchia.

- Class Helcionelloida
  - Subclass Divasibranchia Minichev & Starobogatov, 1975
    - Order Khairkhaniifomes Parkhaev, 2001
      - Family Khairkhaniidae Missarzhevsky, 1989

== Genera ==
Genera in the family Khairkhaniidae include:

- Khairkhania Missarzhevsky, 1981 - type genus of the family Khairkhaniidae
  - Khairkhania rotata Missarzhevsky, 1981
- Barskovia
