= Protowenella =

Protowenella Temporal range: Mid Cambrian

Scientific classification
- Domain: Eukaryota
- Kingdom: Animalia
- Class: †Hyolitha
- Order: †Orthothecida
- Genus: †Protowenella

Extinct genus of hyolith

Protowenella is a genus of hyolith from the Middle Cambrian of Australia and Greenland, previously thought to be a helcionelloid. It has a strongly spiralled, smooth shell with concentric ridges that have low relief. Other than its tighter coiling, it closely resembles Tichkaella.
