= Pojetaia =

Pojetaia Temporal range: Upper Tommotian – lower Middle Cambrian

Scientific classification
- Kingdom: Animalia
- Phylum: Mollusca
- Class: Bivalvia
- Order: †Fordillida
- Family: †Fordillidae
- Genus: †Pojetaia; Jell, 1980

Species
- See text.

Extinct genus of bivalves

Pojetaia is an extinct genus of early bivalves, one of two genera in the extinct family Fordillidae. The genus is known solely from Early to Middle Cambrian fossils found in North America, Greenland, Europe, North Africa, Asia, and Australia. The genus currently contains two accepted species, Pojetaia runnegari, the type species, and Pojetaia sarhroensis, though up to seven species have been proposed. The genera Buluniella, Jellia, and Oryzoconcha are all considered synonyms of Pojetaia.

== Description ==
Pojetaia are small bivalves with valves that are subequal in size and suboval in shape. In size Pojetaia specimens reach a total shell length of less than 2 millimetres (0.079 in) and a height of 25 millimetres (0.98 in). The shells are compressed laterally and the back edge is slightly broadened. The rear adductor is more developed and larger than the front adductor, with the pallial muscles arranged in partially connected series along the valve margins. The ligament is usually straight with an umbo which is central to subcentral and each valve possessing between one and two teeth, with a total of no more than three teeth on a specimen. The exterior of the shells shows faint ribbing and fine comarginal growth lines. The inner shell layers of Fordilla and Pojetaia species both consist of layers of carbonate which is akin to the laminar aragonite layer found in extant monoplacophora. The structuring is similar to shell layering found in the extinct genera Anabarella and Watsonella, which is thought to suggest that members of the phylum Mollusca developed nacre independently several times. Due to the size and age of the fossil specimens, Pojetaia are included as part of the Turkish Small shelly fauna.

== Affinity ==
Pojetaia and Fordilla appear to form a clade, but whether this is in the stem or crown group of Bivalvia is unconstrained by the available evidence.

== Species ==
=== P. runnegari ===
The type species for Pojetaia, P. runnegari was first described by the Australian paleontologist Peter A. Jell in 1980. The description was based on fossils found in early Cambrian Parara Limestone sediments exposed in South Australia. The species has since been found in Cambrian strata of Greenland, Germany, Transbaikalia, Turkey, Northern China, and Mongolia. Fossils tentatively placed in Fordilla from the Browns Pond Formation of New York and Anse Maranda Formation of Quebec have been tentatively reassigned to Pojetaia runnegari. The species P. ostseensis was described in 1995 from two partial fossils found on the island of Bornholm. In his description of the species, Hinz-Schallreuter suggested the presence of three teeth on the left valve and the slightly larger size of the valves as reason for the erection of the new species. Other researchers, such as Elicki, have noted these differences fall into the accepted range of variation for P. runnegari and as such consider P. ostseensis as a synonym rather than valid. The genus Oryzoconcha, with the single species O. prisca, was described in 1985 by He and Pei from fossils found in Henan province, China. Further study by researches has resulted in genus and species being rejected, and the fossils assigned to P. runnegari. Similarly the genus Jellia and its two species J. elliptica and J. ovata, described by Li and Zhou in 1986, are also considered synonyms of P. runnegari as they fall into the rage of variation described for the species. The cryptic genus Buluniella and species B. borealis was described in 1986 by V. Jermak from three fossils found in Northern Siberia. The two right and one left disarticulated valves known show a slightly convexity of the hinge, central umbo and lack of a row of muscle scars were used to the genus from Fordilla. The less distinct umbones were suggested as reason to separate Buluniella from Pojetaia. Due to the high variation in characters of Cambrian bivalve species the validity of Buluniella as a separate genus and species has been questioned several times. In 1992 Bruce Runnegar and John Pojeta recommended Buluniella belonged to Fordilla and suggested the species be treated as Fordilla borealis. Further examination of the fossils has resulted in both the genus and the species being currently treated as a synonym of P. runnegari.

=== P. sarhroensis ===
P. sarhroensis was named by Geyer and Streng in 1998 and is now known from a series of 49 fossils from early middle Cambrian sediments exposed in the Anti-Atlas mountains of Morocco. In the type description the major differences between P. sarhroensis and P. runnegari were noted to be fairly minor. The most distinct features of P. sarhroensis include occasional specimens with up to four teeth, a larger auricle angle, and a posterior tooth which is larger than that in P. runnegari.

== Other fossils ==
It has been suggested at times that the problematic species Watsonella? terranovica may belong to Pojetaia as Pojetaia? terranovica. Reexamination of the species in 1991 by Landing resulted in the conclusion that the species may be a rostroconch from Watsonella or it may be a bivalve. Thus the positioning of the species is currently Watsonella? terranovica but with doubt.
