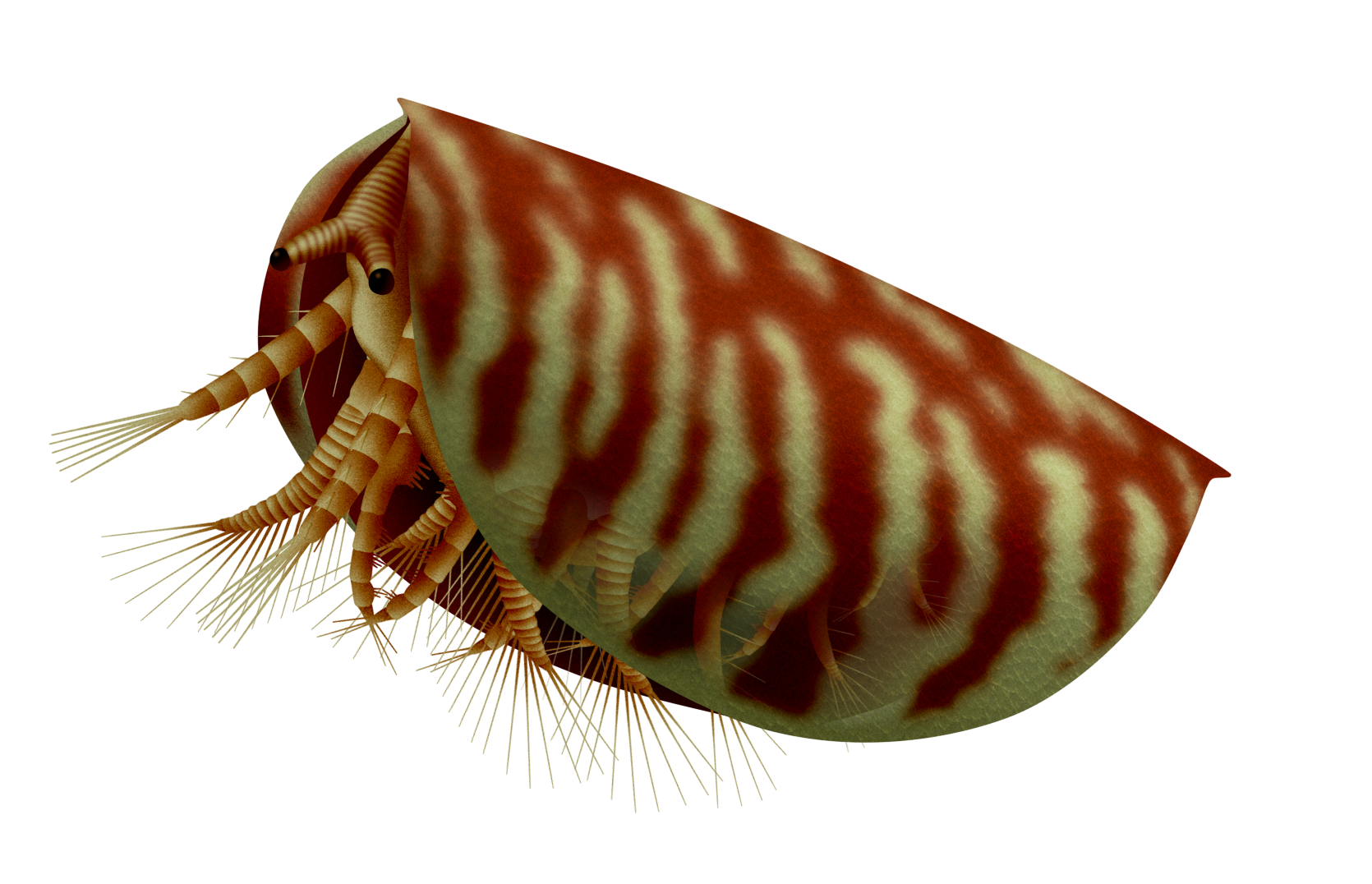
- Reconstruction of Dabashanella

Scientific classification
- Kingdom: Animalia
- Phylum: Arthropoda
- Clade: †Phosphatocopina
- Family: †Dabashanellidae
- Genus: †Dabashanella; Huo, Shu & Fu, 1983

Type species
- Dabashanella hemicyclica Huo, Shu & Fu, 1983

Species
- D. longa Huo, Shu & Fu, 1983 Zhang, 2023; D. hemicyclica; D. semiorbiculata Zhang, 2023; D. unispinata Zhang, 2023; D.? lunaiformis Peel, 2025; D. retroswinga Huo, Shu & Fu, 1983

= Dabashanella =

Dabanshanella Temporal range: Atdabanian–Miaolingian

Genus of crustacean

Dabashanella is a genus of phosphatocopine crustacean of the family Dabashanellidae. Four species, an indeterminate form and a possible fifth species are recognized.

== Distribution ==
Dabashanella fossils have been found in China and possibly North Greenland. The fossils from China are from the Atdabanian and the ones from North Greenland are from the Miaolingian.
