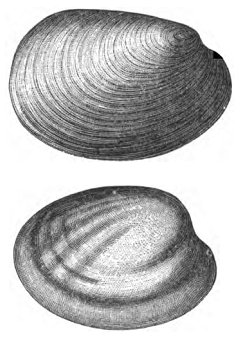
- F. troyensis; outer shell surface (top) and cast of internal anatomy

Scientific classification
- Kingdom: Animalia
- Phylum: Mollusca
- Class: Bivalvia
- Order: †Fordillida
- Family: †Fordillidae
- Genus: †Fordilla; Barrande, 1881

Species
- 3 species (see text)

= Fordilla =

Fordilla Temporal range: Cambrian 520.0–516.0 Ma

Extinct genus of bivalves

Fordilla is an extinct genus of early bivalves, one of two genera in the extinct family Fordillidae. The genus is known solely from Early Cambrian fossils found in North America, Greenland, Europe, the Middle East, and Asia. The genus currently contains three described species, Fordilla germanica, Fordilla sibirica, and the type species Fordilla troyensis.

== Description ==
Fordilla are small bivalves with valves that are equal in size and suboval in shape. In size Fordilla specimens reach a total shell length of up to 4 millimetres (0.16 in) and a height of 2.5 millimetres (0.098 in). The shells are compressed laterally and the back edge is slightly broadened. The rear adductor is less developed and smaller than the front adductor, while the small pedal retractor muscle scar is positioned near the front adductor scar. The valve hinge is usually straight to slightly convexly curved and each valve will have at most one tooth present. The external surface of the shell occasionally show faint ribbing. The inner shell layers of Fordilla species, as with the related genus Pojetaia, consist of layers of carbonate which is akin to the laminar aragonite layer found in extant monoplacophora. The structuring is similar to shell layering found in the extinct genera Anabarella and Watsonella which is thought to suggest members of the phylum Mollusca developed nacre independently several times. Due to the size and age of the fossil specimens, Fordilla are included as part of the Turkish Small shelly fauna.

== Species ==
=== F. germanica ===
Described in 1994, F. germanica is the most recent valid species of Fordilla to be described. As the species etymology indicates, the species was first described from strata of the Zwetau Formation in Germany, with the type locality at Görlitz, Saxony. The species is identifiable from the other two Fordilla species by the more elongated shape of the valves, the straight dorsal edge which has a slight tilt, and by the muscle arrangement. The shells reach up to 3.8 millimetres (0.15 in) long, by 1.8 millimetres (0.071 in) wide and 1.1 millimetres (0.043 in) tall. The placement of F. germanica questioned by Geyer and Streng in 1998 who, noting the size of the specimens, moved the species to Pojetaia as P. germanica. This move was rejected by subsequent authors and the species moved back to Fordilla by Elicki in 2009.

=== F. sibirica ===
F. sibirica was named by I.N. Krasilova in 1977 based on a series of about 20 fossils from the Tyuser Formation in Northeastern Siberia. Since the species description opinions have differed on the validity of its status, with several studies synonymizing it with F. troyensis. The original description cited the placement and more rounded outline of the front adductor scar along with the morphology of dorsal edge as reason for erection of the new species.

=== F. troyensis ===
The type species for Fordilla, F. troyensis was first described by the French paleontologist Joachim Barrande in 1881. The description was based on a group of five fossils found in Cambrian sediments exposed at Troy, New York and purchased by S.W. Ford. The species has since been found in Cambrian strata of Greenland and Newfoundland in North America. Specimens have been confirmed from the island of Bornholm, Denmark. Fossils tentatively placed in Fordilla from the Browns Pond Formation of New York and Anse Maranda Formation of Quebec have been reassigned to Pojetaia runnegari.

== Other fossils ==
Additional fossils have been attributed to the genus since its description. A fossil from North Attleboro, Massachusetts was placed in the genus by Shaler and Foerste in 1888, however this specimen was later determined to be a possible fossil of Heraultia. Fossils form Hartshill, North Warwickshire, England and the lower Cambrian of Portugal have been tentatively placed into Fordilla without assignment to species. Specimens from Zaragoza, Spain were placed into Fordilla with the name Fordilla marini but the size and shape of the specimens indicates they do not belong to the genus. The cryptic genus Buluniella and species B. borealis was described in 1986 by V. Jermak from three fossils found in Northern Siberia. The two right and one left disarticulated valves known show a slightly convexity of the hinge, central umbo and lack of a row of muscle scars were used to the genus from Fordilla. The less distinct umbones were suggested as reason to separate Buluniella from Pojetaia. Due to the high variation in characters of Cambrian bivalve species the validity of Buluniella as a separate genus and species has been questioned several times. In 1992 Bruce Runnegar and John Pojeta recommended Buluniella belonged to Fordilla and suggested the species be treated as Fordilla borealis. Further examination of the fossils has resulted in both the genus and the species being currently treated as a synonym of P. runnegari.
