= Stenothecidae =

Stenothecidae Temporal range: Lower Cambrian – Mid Cambrian

Scientific classification
- Kingdom: Animalia
- Phylum: Mollusca
- Class: †Helcionelloida
- Order: †Helcionelliformes
- Superfamily: †Yochelcionelloidea
- Family: †Stenothecidae; Runegar & Jell, 1980

Genera
- See text

Extinct family of molluscs

Stenothecidae is an extinct family of fossil univalved Cambrian molluscs which may be either gastropods or monoplacophorans.

The name of this taxon should not be confused with that of the class Stenothecoida, a group of problematic Cambrian invertebrates that have a bivalved (dorsal and ventral) shell.

== Morphology ==
The group comprises conical laterally compressed shells that may be smooth or ornamented with folds or ribs. The shells are broadly limpet-like, which led to their initial consideration as monoplacophoran molluscs.

== Taxonomy ==
The taxonomic position of the group is unclear; it has been classified as a Yochelcionelloid or Helcionelloid. It is not obviously in the stem group of any modern molluscan class, and has been referred to the monoplacophora, although the monoplacophora are no longer considered to be a clade, and thus that classification means little more than "primitive mollusc".

== Genera ==
The family Stenothecidae consists of two subfamilies and the following genera:

- Stenothecinae Runegar & Jell, 1980 - synonym: Mellopegmidae Missarzhevsky, 1989
  - Stenotheca Salter [in Hicks], 1872 – type genus of the family Stenothecidae
  - Mellopegma Runegar & Jell, 1976
- Watsonellinae Parkhaev, 2001
  - Watsonella Grabau, 1900 – type genus of the subfamily Watsonellinae
    - Watsonella crosbyi Grabau – type species of the genus Watsonella
