= Bruce Runnegar =

Australian paleontologist

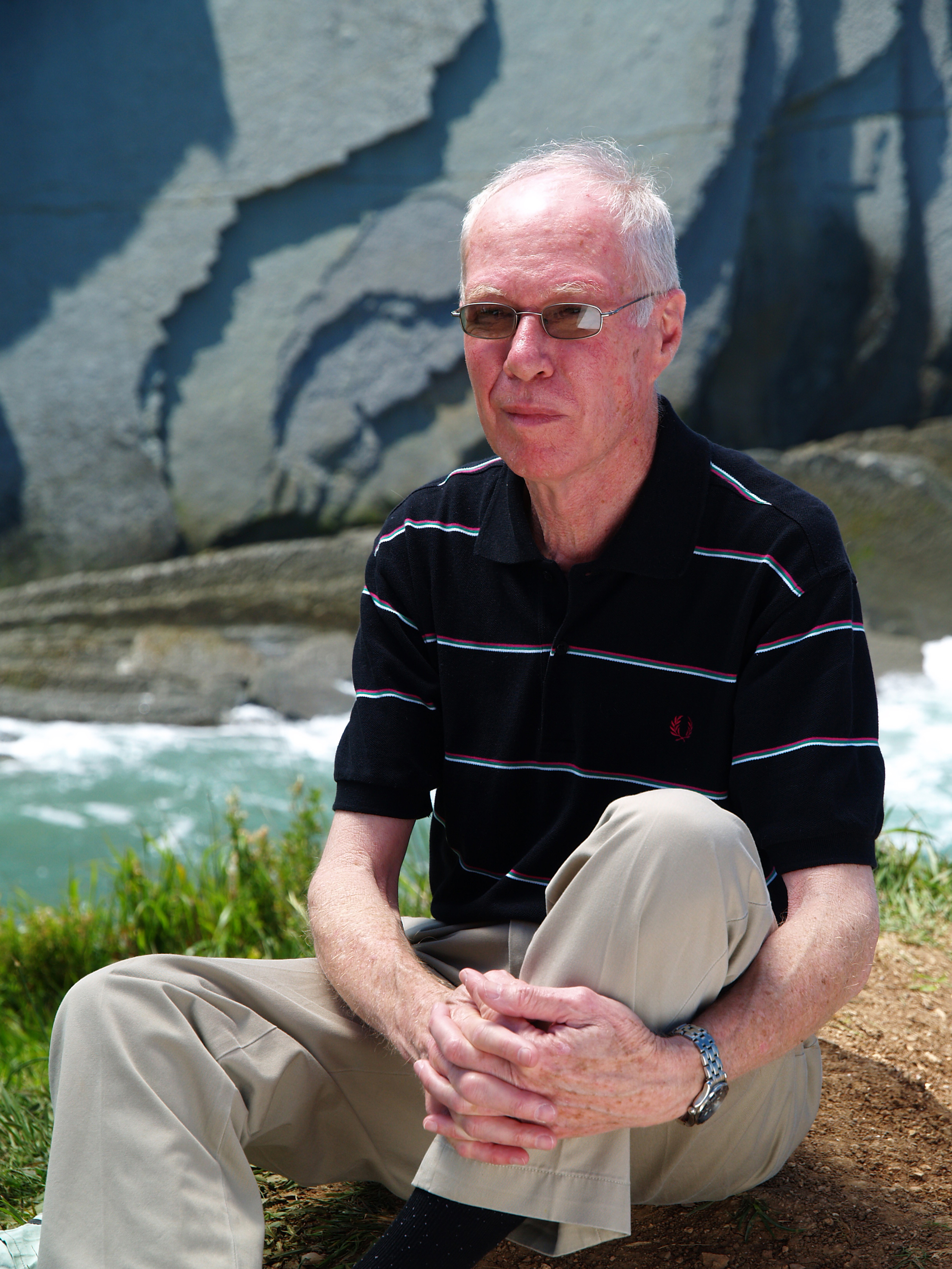
Bruce Runnegar

Bruce Norman Runnegar (born 2 February 1941, Brisbane) is an Australian-born paleontologist and professor at UCLA. His research centers on using the fossil record to determine how, where, and when life originated and evolved. He has published on a wide variety of topics, including the phylogeny of molluscs, Dickinsonia fossils and oxygen levels, and molecular clock techniques.

One of the earliest species of molluscs, Pojetaia runnegari, is named after him.

== Early life ==
Runnegar was educated at the University of Queensland, graduating with his B.Sc. with honours in 1964. He would go on to take his PhD at UQ in 1967, under supervisor, Palaeozoic coral palaeontologist Professor Dorothy Hill. He was a teaching fellow at the University from 1964 to 1967 as well as a demonstrator in 1967. Following his PhD he took up a lecturing position at the University of New England in 1968. He took his D.Sc. from UQ in 1978.

== Career ==
After a year at the Smithsonian Institution in Washington D.C., as a National Research Council Visiting Postdoctoral Research Associate, Runnegar returned to the University of New England in 1970. He would be promoted to Senior Lecturer in 1971 and Associate Professor 1974. He was Head of the Department of Geology and Geophysics from 1983 and became Professor of Geology and Geophysics (personal chair) in 1985.

In 1987, Runnegar took a position as Professor in the Department of Earth and Space Sciences at the University of California, Los Angeles. He was Director of the IGPP Centre for Astrobiology (joint University of California/NASA Astrobiology Institute) from 1998 and Director of the NASA Astrobiology Institute from 2002 to 2006.

He was the Foundation editor of the Australian palaeontology journal, Alcheringa in 1974. He was President of the Association of Australasian Palaeontologists from 1984 to 1985.

== Honors and awards ==
- Recipient of the Mawson Medal of the Australian Academy of Science (1981)
- Fellow of the Australian Academy of Science (1987)
- Fellow of the American Association for the Advancement of Science (1993)
- Fellow of the Geological Society of America (1998)
- Recipient of the Lapworth Medal (2009)
- Recipient of the Paleontological Society Medal (2010)

== Personal life ==
Runnegar is married to wife, Maria. They have one daughter.
