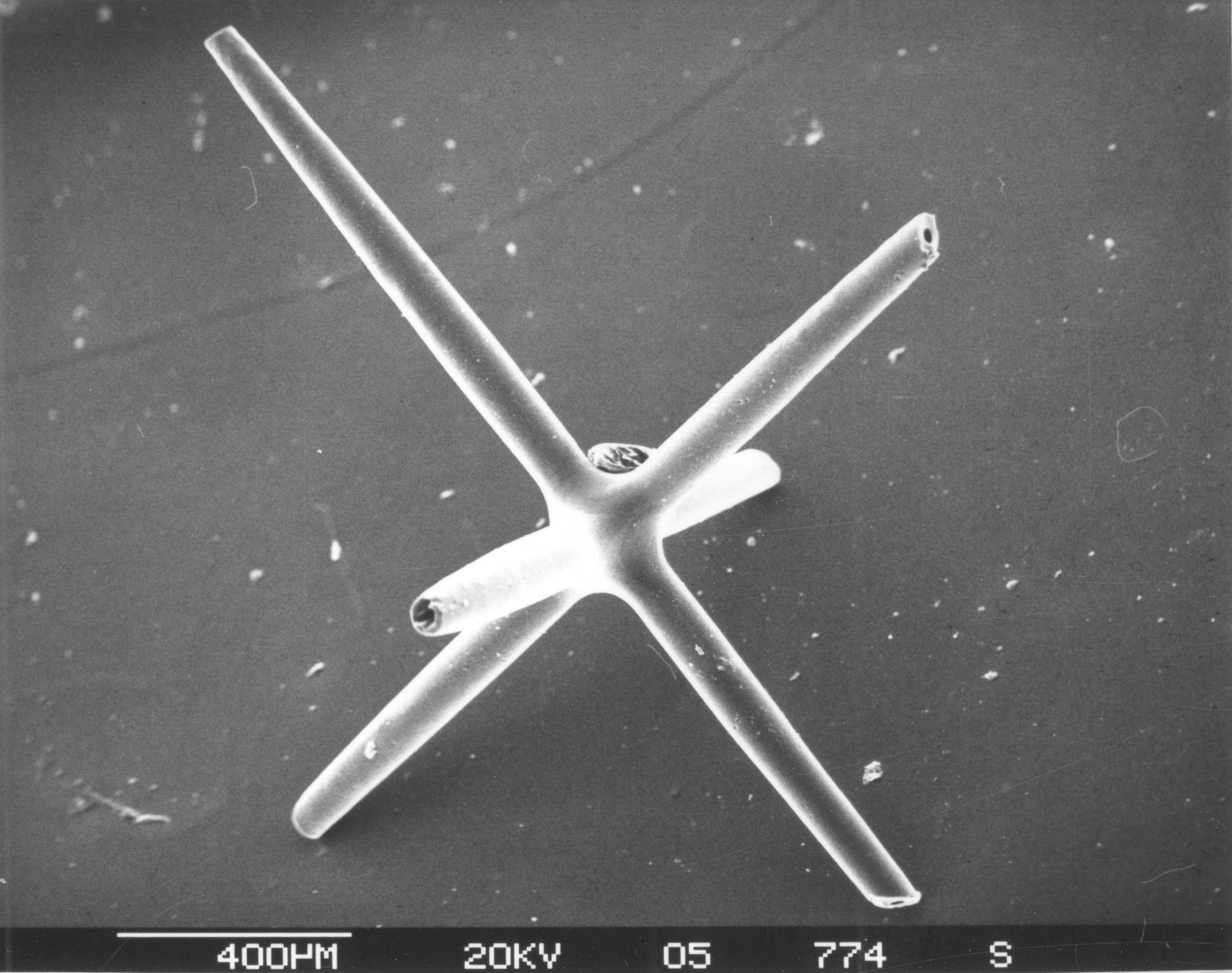
- Hexactinellid spicule

Scientific classification
- Kingdom: Animalia
- Phylum: Porifera
- Clade: Silicispongia; Schmidt, 1862

Classes
- Demospongiae; Hexactinellida; †Ascospongiae

= Siliceous sponge =

Siliceous sponges

Clade of sponges

The siliceous sponges form a major clade of the phylum Porifera, consisting of classes Demospongiae (common sponges) and Hexactinellida (glass sponges). They are characterized by spicules made out of silicon dioxide, unlike calcareous sponges.

Individual siliachoates (silica skeleton scaffolding) can be arranged tightly within the sponginocyte or crosshatched and fused together. Siliceous spicules come in two sizes called megascleres and microscleres.

== Systematics ==
Most studies support the monophyly of siliceous sponges.

The group, as a part of the phylum Porifera, has been named Silicispongia (Schmidt, 1862) and Silicea (Bowerbank, 1864). Silicarea is a proposed new phylum based on molecular studies of the phylum Porifera. It consists of the Poriferan classes Demospongiae and Hexactinellida. Some scientists believe that Porifera is polyphyletic/paraphyletic, and that some sponges, the Calcarea, are a separate phylum which was the first to diverge from the main line of kingdom Animalia. Silicarea is considered the next phylum to diverge from the primary animal lineage.

== Ecology ==
Siliceous sponges are usually found in the marine ecosystem but they are occasionally found in freshwater.

During the Triassic, siliceous sponges grew reefs similar to calcarea of the modern era. During the Cretaceous period, diatoms became so successful that they significantly decreased the amount of silica present in sea water, after which "siliceous sponges could never again form reefs."
