= Watsonella =

Watsonella Temporal range: Cambrian Stage 2, c. 530–525 Ma

Scientific classification
- Kingdom: Animalia
- Phylum: Mollusca (?)
- Genus: †Watsonella; Grabau, 1900

Type species
- Watsonella crosbyi Grabau, 1900

Accepted species
- Watsonella crosbyi Grabau, 1900

Synonyms
- Heraultia Cobbold, 1935; Heraultipegma Pojeta and Runnegar, 1976

Extinct genus of molluscs

Watsonella is an extinct genus of mollusc known from early (Terreneuvian) Cambrian strata. It has been hypothesized to be close to the origin of bivalves. It contains a single species, Watsonella crosbyi.

The genus is closely related to Anabarella, with which it bears many morphological similarities, including a laminar internal shell microstructure said to connect it with the early bivalves Fordilla and Pojetaia.

== Taxonomy ==
Watsonella was described by Amadeus William Grabau in 1900, with the type species Watsonella crosbyi. The type specimen was found in a fossil-filled boulder collected by Thomas Augustus Watson, the assistant of Alexander Graham Bell who received the first-ever telephone call. The genus name honors Watson and the species name honors Professor William Otis Crosby. Grabau initially interpreted Watsonella as a heteropod gastropod similar to the modern genus Carinaria. In 1935, E. S. Cobbold named the genus Heraultia based on specimens from France, with the type species Heraultia varensalensis. He tentatively interpreted it as a notostracan crustacean. He noted "striking" similarity between it and Watsonella, but concluded that it was "impossible to bring them together" without more information on the affinities of Watsonella. Because the name Heraultia had already been used for a genus of fly, in 1976 John Pojeta and Bruce Runnegar proposed the name Heraultipegma as a replacement. Pojeta and Runnegar reinterpreted Heraultipegma and Watsonella as the earliest known rostroconchs. In 1988, Martin Kerber hesitantly synonymized Heraultipegma and Watsonella, and Ed Landing affirmed their synonymy in 1989. In 2001, P. Yu. Parkhaev included Watsonella in Stenothecidae and proposed the subfamily Watsonellinae to include it.

Only one species of Watsonella is recognized as valid, the type species W. crosbyi. The species Heraultia varensalensis, Heraultia sibirica, and Heraultipegma yunnanensis are all considered synonyms of W. crosbyi. Another species, Heraultipegma charaulachica, has been reassigned to the genus Xianfengella.

== Description ==
Watsonella was a small, laterally-compressed animal, generally less than 5 millimetres (0.20 in) long. It had a single "pseudobivalved" shell. It is not known with certainty which end of the shell is the front.

The external surface of the shell was ornamented with comarginal growth lines and ribs.

Unlike rostroconchs, Watsonella lacked a pegma, although the curvature of the shell may have served a functionally similar role. Although Pojeta and Runnegar and Landing interpreted a pegma as present, several studies have rejected this interpretation. Li and colleagues interpreted the putative pegma as an artifact of the curvature of the shell.

The shell of Watsonella was probably originally aragonitic in composition. It was composed of two layers with distinct microstructure. The outer layer was composed of regular, tightly-packed prismatic units that were oriented perpendicular to the shell wall. The inner layer was composed of flattened units called lamellae that produced a stepwise texture. Unlike many modern mollusks, the shell was not nacreous.

== Paleobiology ==
Watsonella was probably a burrowing animal. Because of the limited flexibility of its hingeless shell, its burrowing ability would have been less efficient than modern burrowing clams.

== Evolutionary relationships ==
Anabarella was probably the ancestor of Watsonella. Morphological intermediates linking Anabarella and Watsonella are known. The shell microstructure is very similar between Anabarella, Watsonella, and the early bivalves Fordilla and Pojetaia.

A phylogenetic analysis conducted in 2000 by a team of researchers led by J. G. Carter recovered Watsonella as more closely related to bivalves than rostroconchs.

In 2023, a team of researchers led by Hao Song argued that Watsonella was too early to be a stem-group bivalve, based on molecular clock results that suggested that bivalves and scaphopods diverged from each other approximately 520 million years ago. They suggested that Watsonella should be reinterpreted as stem-group members of Diasoma, the clade uniting bivalves and scaphopods.

== Biostratigraphic significance ==
Watsonella has been proposed as an index fossil of the Cambrian, defining a W. crosbyi zone. Notwithstanding the weakness of a first appearance datum as a definition for the base of a period, the species has been proposed as a marker for the base of the presently unratified second stage of the Terreneuvian (i.e. Cambrian Stage 2). However, the species has now been found late in the Fortunian, drawing back its first occurrence. But that said its occurrence in Australia seems to begin rather near the base of Stage 2.
