= Frederick Chapman (palaeontologist) =

Australian palaeontologist

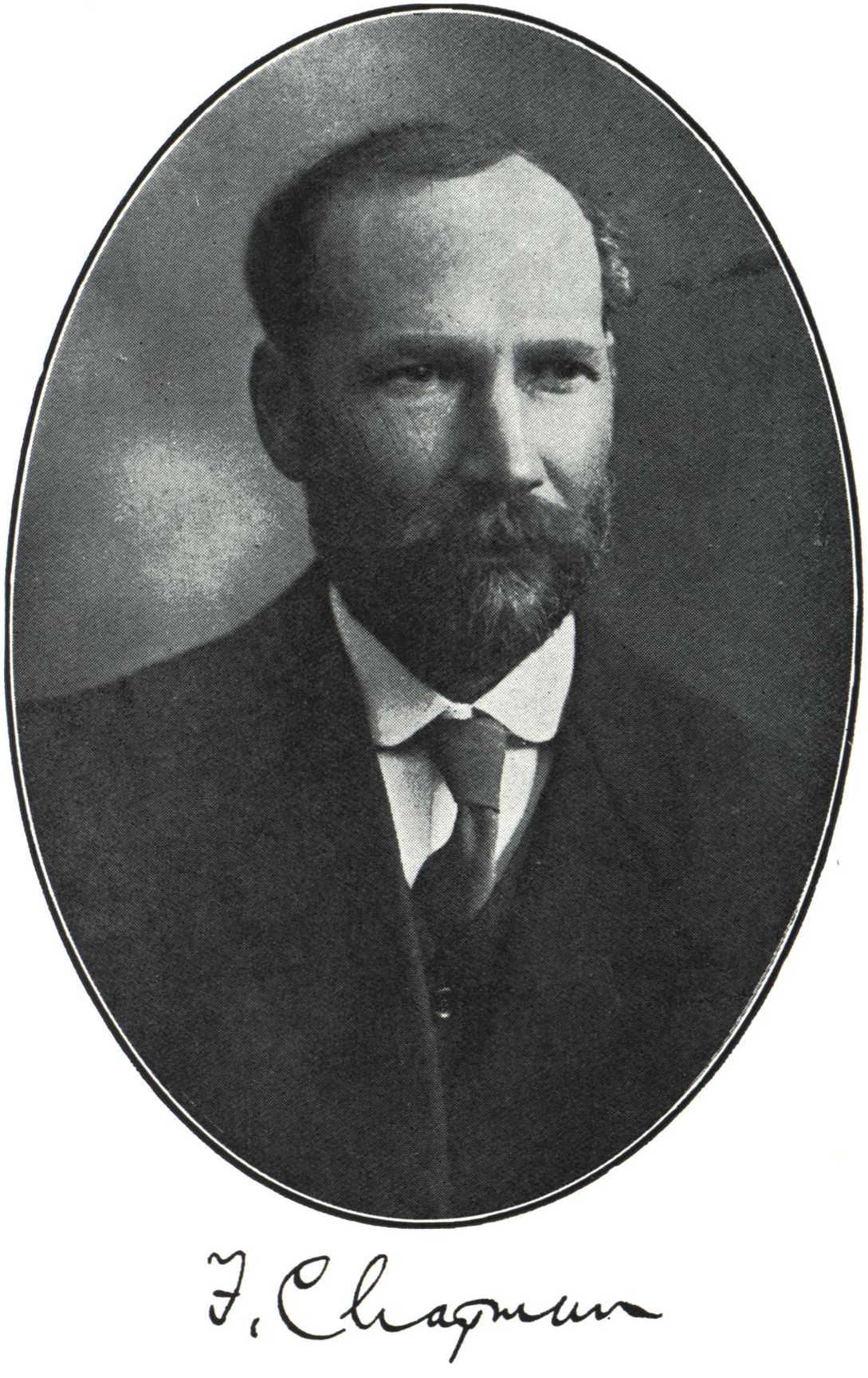
Frederick Chapman

Frederick Chapman (13 February 1864 – 10 December 1943) was an English-born Australian palaeontologist. He was the inaugural Commonwealth palaeontologist in Australia, and a world authority on Foraminifera.

== Early life and education ==
Frederick Chapman was born in Camden Town, London, England, on 13 February 1864. He was the son of surgical instrument-maker Robert Chapman and his wife Eleanor (née Dinsey).

He studied at and qualified as a teacher of geology and physiography from the Royal College of Science in London, where he was from 1881 an assistant to John Wesley Judd. He was encouraged by Judd's study of boring samples from around London.

== Career ==
Chapman was palaeontologist to the National Museum of Victoria in Melbourne, Australia, from 1902 to 1927. During this time he was assigned the task of amalgamating and organising the fossil collections of fossils the Geological Survey of Victoria and the University of Melbourne. He published papers on the collection of fossils stored there, including sponges, corals, and fishes.

From 1920 until 1932, he also lectured part-time at the University of Melbourne.

He then served as the first Australian Commonwealth Palaeontologist from 1927 until 1935, where his brief included analysing fossils from materials extracted in the course of exploring the country in hopes of finding oil. Irene Crespin was his assistant, and later succeeded him. His Book of Fossils was published in London and Sydney in 1934.

== Other activities ==
Chapman served as president of:

- Microscopical Society of Victoria, 1919–1920
- Field Naturalists Club of Victoria, 1919–1920
- Royal Society of Victoria, 1929 to 1930

He was also honorary curator of the Maranoa Botanic Gardens in Balwyn, Melbourne.

== Recognition ==
Chapman's awards included:

- 1899: Lyell Prize for research by the Geological Society of London
- 1920: David Syme Research Prize of the University of Melbourne
- 1930: Lyell Medal, Geological Society of London
- 1932: Clarke Medal by the Royal Society of New South Wales
- 1941: Australian Natural History Medallion by the Field Naturalists Club of Victoria

Other recognition and honours include:

- 1892: Fellow, Royal Microscopical Society, London
- 1896: Associate, Linnean Society of London
- 1920: Honorary Palaeontologist, Geological Survey of Victoria
- 1920: Elected member of the International Commission on Zoological Nomenclature
- 1922: Elected Member (Geology), Australian National Research Council
- 1926: Honorary Fellow, Royal Society of South Australia
- 1932: Honorary fellow of the Royal Society of New Zealand
- 1933: Corresponding Member, Paleontological Society, U.S.

== Family ==
Chapman married Helen Mary Dancer on 12 August 1890, who died in 1940. Frederick died on 10 December 1943 and was survived by a son, Wilfrid, and one daughter.

== Death and legacy ==
Chapman died on at Kew, Victoria.

His most important work, The Foraminifera. An Introduction to the Study of the Protozoa (London, 1902) remained the only work in that field until 1928.

In 1949 his son Wilfred presented Chapman's substantial collection of photographic slides to the Bureau of Mineral Resources in Canberra, which also bought his library. However, many of his microfossils and rare books were destroyed by fire in 1953.

== Publications ==
Chapman wrote prolifically, publishing five books and around 500 scientific papers, some co-authored, on geology, palaeontology, and zoology. Between 1886 and 1902 he wrote mostly about both fossilised and living Foraminifera, as well as some geological subjects.

In 1905 and 1907, Chapman published two papers on the tertiary rocks of the New Hebrides (now Vanuatu) based on a 1903 study (published 1905) by Australian geologist Douglas Mawson. He also co-authored another one about the New Hebrides with Mawson in 1906, which was published in the Quarterly Journal of the Geological Society of London.

=== Selected books ===
- (1902) The Foraminifera. An Introduction to the Study of the Protozoa. London. (His most important work, and the only work of its type until 1928.)
- (1914) Australian Fossils. Melbourne, Sydney, Adelaide, Brisbane, and London. Project Gutenberg eBook 59074
- (1934) Book of Fossils. London and Sydney.

=== Selected papers ===
- Chapman F. (1905). "On some Foraminifera and Ostracoda obtained off Great Barrier Island, New Zealand". Transactions and Proceedings of the New Zealand Institute 38, 77-112.
- Chapman F. (1911). "New or Little Known Victorian Fossils in the National Museum." Proceedings of the Royal Society of Victoria, Melbourne 23: 305-324. plate 58-61.
- Chapman F. (1935). "On some Phyllocarids from the Ordovician of Preservation Inlet and Cape Providence, New Zealand". Transactions and Proceedings of the Royal Society of New Zealand 64 105-114.
- Chapman F. (1935). "Descriptions of Fossil Fish from New Zealand". Transactions and Proceedings of the Royal Society of New Zealand 64 117-121.
  - In this work he described ray-finned fishes new genus Eothyrsites, Eothyrsites holosquamatus, Portheus dunedinensis.

Awards
Preceded by Robert John Tillyard	Clarke Medal; 1932	Succeeded by Walter George Woolnough
