= Hyolithelmintida =

Hyolithelmintida Temporal range: Early Cambrian – Mid Cambrian

Scientific classification
- Kingdom: Animalia
- Phylum: incertae sedis
- Order: †Hyolithelmintida

Extinct order of Cambrian organisms

Hyolithohelminths are phosphatic tubular fossils from the Cambrian period. They were sedentary, possibly infaunal, organisms; once thought to have opercula (hence the comparison with hyoliths), these structures are now understood to be unrelated shells.
