= Rostroconchia =

Rostroconchia Temporal range: Cambrian - Permian
- Technophorus sharpei

Scientific classification
- Domain: Eukaryota
- Kingdom: Animalia
- Phylum: Mollusca
- Subphylum: Conchifera
- Class: †Rostroconchia; Pojeta et al., 1972

Extinct class of molluscs

The Rostroconchia is a class of extinct molluscs dating from the early Cambrian to the Late Permian. They were initially thought to be bivalves, but were later given their own class. They have a single shell in their larval stage, and the adult typically has a single, pseudo-bivalved shell enclosing the mantle and muscular foot. The anterior part of the shell probably pointed downward and had a gap from which the foot could probably emerge. Rostroconchs probably lived a sedentary semi-infaunal lifestyle. There were probably more than 1,000 species of members of this class.

Approximately 3 dozen genera and an even greater number of species have been described. Generally, rostroconchs are small, less than two centimeters in length, but larger forms, found in United States Devonian limestones, can grow to a length of 15 cm.

== Morphology and lifestyle ==
Externally, rostroconchs look much like bivalves and rostroconchs probably had an extendable muscular foot, indicated by a prominent anterior gape in the rostroconch's shell. It seems, however, that the internal anatomy and morphology of the foot were closer to that of the scaphopods.

Rostroconchs began their life as a small, bilaterally symmetrical, univalved protoconch planktonic larva. The bilateral shell grew into two valves as the rostroconch entered adulthood. Adult rostroconchs differ from bivalves because they have no functional hinge. Unlike the shell of a bivalve, which was able to move or articulate, the shell layers of a rostroconch — the layers of rigid calcite— continue across the whole dorsal area of the rostroconch. The two valves would have been rigidly fixed in place, and would have to have been broken periodically to allow the rostroconch shell to grow.

The posterior of the shell contains a flattened tube that is called the rostrum. The rostroconch probably burrowed itself into sediment, anterior first, leaving the rostrum above the sediment to be used as a water filtration system.

== Evolutionary history ==
Heraultipegma is the earliest, very primitive, rostroconch genus dating from the Late Terreneuvian. True Rostroconchs appeared during the Ordovician, heavily competing with the bivalves until their decline in the end-early Ordovician turnover.

Early, primitive rostroconchs such as Ribeiroia had a hinge in which all shell layers covered the dorsal region resulting in a very rigid shell. In Conocardium, a more advanced rostroconch, the outer shell layers do not cross the entire margin, suggesting independent steps towards the bivalve flexible hinge.

Some evidence suggests that the conocardoid rostroconchs were the predecessors to the Scaphopoda.
