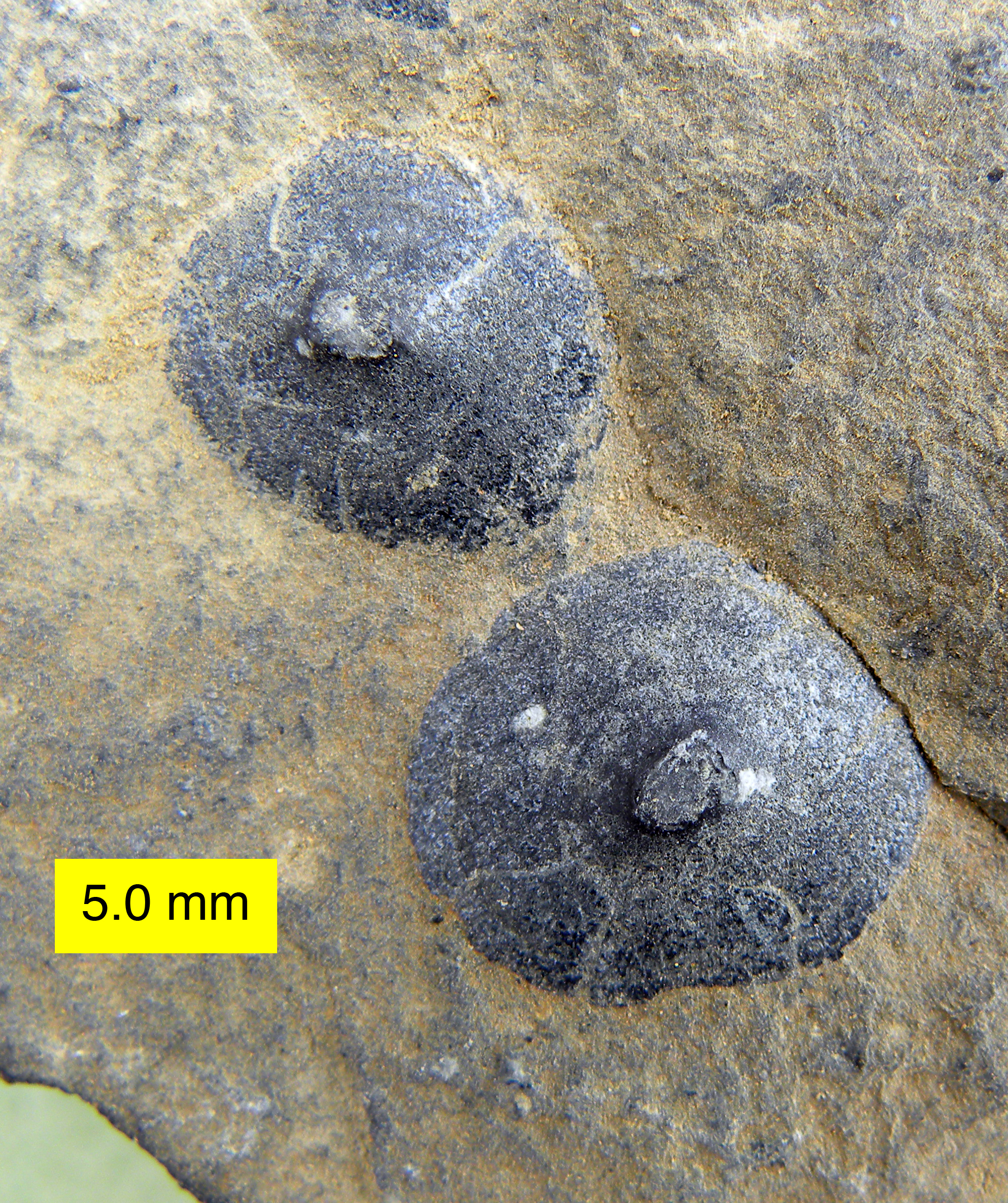
- Scenella from the Burgess Shale, Middle Cambrian, Walcott Quarry, near Field, British Columbia.

Scientific classification
- Kingdom: Animalia
- Phylum: Mollusca
- Class: incertae sedis
- Superfamily: †Scenelloidea; Miller, 1889

= Scenelloidea =

Scenelloidea Temporal range: Cambrian Stage 3–Late Ordovician

Extinct superfamily of gastropods

Scenelloidea is an extinct superfamily of paleozoic molluscs of uncertain position (Gastropoda, Helcionelloida, or Monoplacophora).

== Families ==
Based on the taxonomy of the Gastropoda by Bouchet & Rocroi (2005) families in the Scenelloidea include:

- † Scenellidae
- † Coreospiridae
- † Igarkiellidae
