= Yochelcionella =

Yochelcionella Temporal range: Tommotian
- Drawing of a reconstruction of Yochelcionella cyrano as a snail-like organism

Scientific classification
- Kingdom: Animalia
- Phylum: Mollusca
- Class: †Helcionelloida
- Order: †Helcionelliformes
- Family: †Yochelcionellidae
- Genus: †Yochelcionella; Runegar & Pojeta, 1974

Species
- See text.

Extinct genus of molluscs

Yochelcionella is an extinct genus of basal molluscs which lived during the Tommotian epoch, the first epoch of the Cambrian period. This genus is often reconstructed to resemble snails.

Yochelcionella is the type genus of the family Yochelcionellidae.

== Description ==
'Alternative reconstructions of water currents (arrowed) in Yochelcionella cyrano. The interpretation favoured by Pojeta & Runnegar (1976) with the anteriorly located snorkel housing the inhalant stream. and the reconstruction favoured by Geyer (in press) with the posteriorly located snorkel containing the exhalant current.

This genus of molluscs possessed shells which were shaped like curved caps, with an exhaust pipe shaped "snorkel" emanating underneath where the apex (point of the shell) curves over. It is believed that the "snorkel" was used in breathing, allowing waste water to flow away from the gills.

== Taxonomy ==
When they were first discovered, they were originally thought to be monoplacophorans. Their snorkel may represent a move towards a tubular shell, such as is seen in the modern scaphopods. It has also been interpreted as a precursor to the cephalopod funnel or siphuncle.

The taxonomy of the Gastropoda by Bouchet & Rocroi, 2005 categorizes Yochelcionella in the family Yochelcionellidae within the superfamilia Yochelcionelloidea within the Paleozoic molluscs of uncertain position within Mollusca (Gastropoda or Monoplacophora).

For an alternate 2007-2007 taxonomy by P. Yu. Parkhae see Helcionelloida.

== Species ==
Species in the genus Yochelcionella include:

- Yochelcionella americana Runnegar & Pojeta, 1980
- Yochelcionella angustiplicata
- Yochelcionella chinensis Pei, 1985
- Yochelcionella crassa Zhegallo in Esakova et Zhegallo, 1996
- Yochelcionella cyrano Runnegar and Pojeta 1974 type species. Its type locality is ANU Collection 10352, 16 km northeast of Mootwingee Aboriginal Site, which is in a Solvan carbonate limestone in the Coonigan Formation of Australia..
- Yochelcionella daleki
- Yochelcionella erecta (Walcott, 1891)
- Yochelcionella gracilis Atkins & Peel, 2004
- Yochelcionella greenlandica Atkins & Peel, 2004
- Yochelcionella ostentata
- Yochelcionella saginata Vendrasco et al., 2010
- Yochelcionella snorkorum Vendrasco et al., 2010
