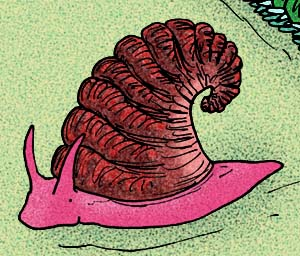
- Latouchella costata restored as a gastropod

Scientific classification
- Kingdom: Animalia
- Phylum: Mollusca
- Class: †Helcionelloida
- Subclass: †Archaeobranchia
- Order: †Helcionelliformes; Geyer, 1994

Subgroups
- See text.

Synonyms
- Helcionelliformes Golikov & Starobogatov, 1975

= Helcionellid =

Helcionellid Temporal range: Fortunian–Early Ordovician

Extinct order of molluscs

Helcionellid or Helcionelliformes is an order of small fossil shells that are universally interpreted as molluscs, though no sources spell out why this taxonomic interpretation is preferred. These animals are first found about 540 to 530 million years ago in the late Nemakit-Daldynian age, which is the earliest part of the Cambrian period. A single species persisted to the Early Ordovician. These fossils are component of the small shelly fossils (SSF) assemblages.

These are thought to be early molluscs with rather snail-like shells, although they lack any compelling molluscan synapomorphies and thus may not belong to the group.

They have been alleged to represent ancestors of the modern conchiferans, a group that includes all the well-known modern classes – gastropods, cephalopods and bivalves. They have also been considered to represent direct ancestors to the cephalopods.

Parkhaev (2006, 2007) considers these animals to be crown-group gastropods. Previous to the 2006 classification by Parkhaev, helcionellids were classified within the separate class Helcionelloida or as "Uncertain position (Gastropoda or Monoplacophora)" within "Paleozoic molluscs of uncertain systematic position" according to the taxonomy of the Gastropoda by Bouchet & Rocroi, 2005.

== 2006-2007 taxonomy ==
According to P. Yu. Parkhaev, the order Helcionelliformes is within the subclass Archaeobranchia Parkhaev, 2001 in the class Gastropoda.

Order Helcionelliformes Golikov & Starobogatov, 1975

- Superfamily Helcionelloidea Wenz, 1938
  - Family Helcionellidae Wenz, 1938
  - Family Carinopeltidae Parkhaev, 2013 (syn "Igarkiellidae" Parkhaev, 2001)
  - Family Coreospiridae Knight, 1947
- Superfamily Yochelcionelloidea Runnegar & Jell, 1976
  - Family Trenellidae Parkhaev, 2001
  - Family Yochelcionellidae Runnegar & Jell, 1976
  - Family Stenothecidae Runnegar & Jell, 1980
    - Subfamily Stenothecinae Runnegar & Jell, 1980
    - Subfamily Watsonellinae Parkhaev, 2001

== Morphology ==
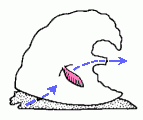
This speculative restoration of the tiny Helcionellid fossil Yochelcionella shows water flowing in under the shell, over the gills and out through the "exhaust pipe".

Helcionellids have a single shell, in which the peak forms a distinctive curve. Some have horizontal "inhalent siphons" ("exhaust pipes") on the concave edges of their shells, and there is debate about whether these pointed forwards or backwards. Most helcionellid fossils that have been collected are only a few millimeters long (1/8 inch) and rather snail-like. However specimens a few centimeters long (1–2 inches) have also been found, mainly limpet-like in shape, although some were laterally compressed and others were tall. The smallest specimens may have been juvenile or larval forms of the larger specimens.

Inside the shell are a series of longitudinal ridges stretching to the apex. Some people reckon that they are to do with controlling water currents in a mantle cavity; others think that they are to do with support or muscle attachment.

Shell muscles attach near the concave side of the shell.

== Fossil record ==
The earliest helcionellid, in Siberian sections, is Oelandiella.

They first appear in the late Nemakit-Daldynian (lower Early Cambrian), and are a constituent of the small shelly fauna (SSF). Larger individuals, reaching centimeters in diameter, have also been found.

Helcionellids have been interpreted as juvenile stages of larger limpet-like molluscs.

== See also ==
- Eurekapegma a helcionellid from the Middle Cambrian of New Zealand
