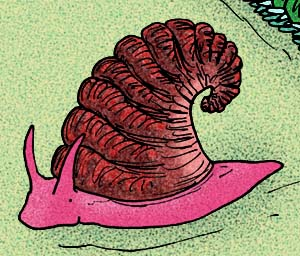
- Latouchella costata

Scientific classification
- Kingdom: Animalia
- Phylum: Mollusca
- Subphylum: Conchifera
- Class: †Helcionelloida; Peel, 1991

Orders
- Order Helcionelliformes; Order Pelagialliformes; Order Khairkhaniiformes; Order Onychochiliformes; and see text

= Helcionelloida =

Helcionelloida Temporal range: Early Cambrian–Early Ordovician

Extinct class of molluscs

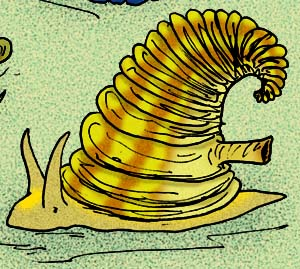
Yochelcionella cyrano

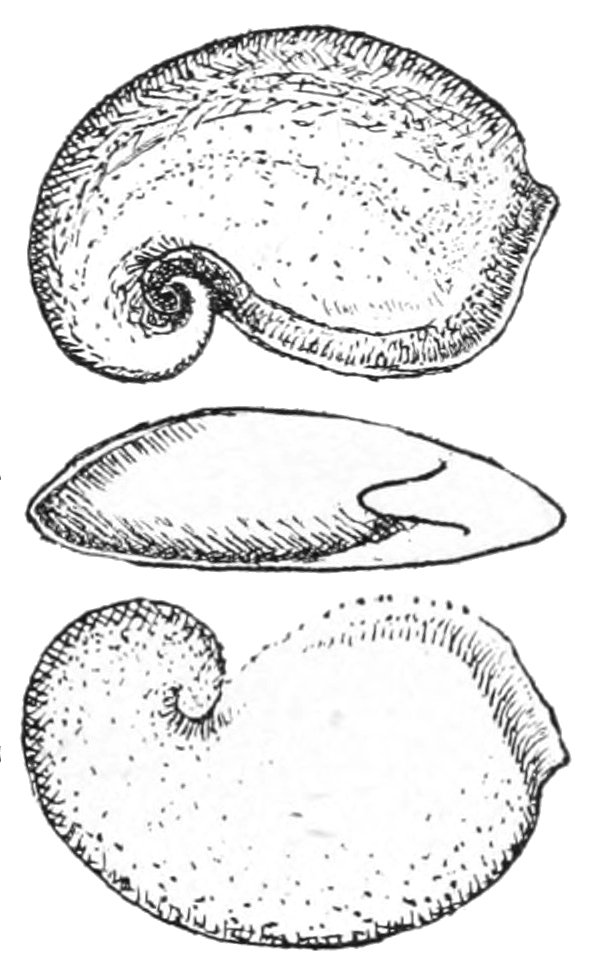
Pelagiella atlantoides

Helcionelloida is an extinct group of ancient molluscs (phylum Mollusca). These are the oldest known conchiferan molluscs, that is, they had a mineralised shell. Some members of this class were mistaken for Monoplacophorans. The class was erected by Peel in 1991.

== Anatomy ==
These animals were untorted and they had a coiled, cone-shaped shell. The majority of species were small (shells being about two millimeters in length and or diameter). Modern reconstructions depict them as resembling snails. The shells of some genera, particularly Yochelcionella, also possessed a "snorkel"-like opening which was most likely used for breathing.

== 2005 taxonomy ==
The taxonomy of the Gastropoda by Bouchet & Rocroi, 2005 categorizes members of this taxon within the Paleozoic molluscs of uncertain systematic position, but that taxonomy to not use the name Helcionelloida.

== 2006-2007 taxonomy ==
Taxonomy of helcionelloid according to the opinion of P. Yu. Parkhaev:

Gastropoda Cuvier, 1797

Subclass Archaeobranchia Parkhaev, 2001

- Order Helcionelliformes Golikov & Starobogatov, 1975

- Superfamily Helcionelloidea Wenz, 1938

- Family Helcionellidae Wenz, 1938
- Family Igarkiellidae Parkhaev, 2001
- Family Coreospiridae Knight, 1947

- Superfamily Yochelcionelloidea Runnegar & Jell, 1976

- Family Trenellidae Parkhaev, 2001
- Family Yochelcionellidae Runnegar & Jell, 1976
- Family Stenothecidae Runnegar & Jell, 1980

- Subfamily Stenothecinae Runnegar & Jell, 1980
- Subfamily Watsonellinae Parkhaev, 2001

- Order Pelagielliformes MacKinnon, 1985

- Family Pelagiellidae Knight, 1952
- Family Aldanellidae Linsley et Kier, 1984

Subclass Divasibranchia Minichev & Starobogatov, 1975

- Order Khairkhaniiformes Parkhaev, 2001

- Family Khairkhaniidae Missarzhevsky, 1989

Subclass Dextrobranchia Minichev & Starobogatov, 1975

- Order Onychochiliformes Minichev & Starobogatov, 1975

- Family Onychochilidae Koken, 1925
