= 2019 in paleomalacology =

This list 2019 in paleomalacology is a list of new taxa of ammonites and other fossil cephalopods, as well as fossil gastropods, bivalves and other molluscs that were described during the year 2019, as well as other significant discoveries and events related to molluscan paleontology that would occur in 2019.

== General research ==
- Description of an assemblage of conchiferan mollusks from the Cambrian Shackleton Limestone (Antarctica) is published by Claybourn et al. (2019).
- A study on Early Triassic recovery of ammonites and gastropods after the Permian–Triassic extinction event is published by Pietsch et al. (2019).
- A study on the impact of the Cenomanian-Turonian boundary event and other Cretaceous oceanic anoxic events on generic- and species-level molluscan diversity, extinction rates and ecological turnover is published by Freymueller, Moore & Myers (2019).
- A juvenile ammonite specimen assigned to the genus Puzosia and four marine gastropods are reported from the Cretaceous Burmese amber of Myanmar by Yu et al. (2019).
- A study on the timing and nature of recovery of benthic marine ecosystems of Antarctica after the Cretaceous–Paleogene extinction event, as indicated by data from fossils of benthic molluscs, is published by Whittle et al. (2019).

== Ammonites ==
=== Research ===
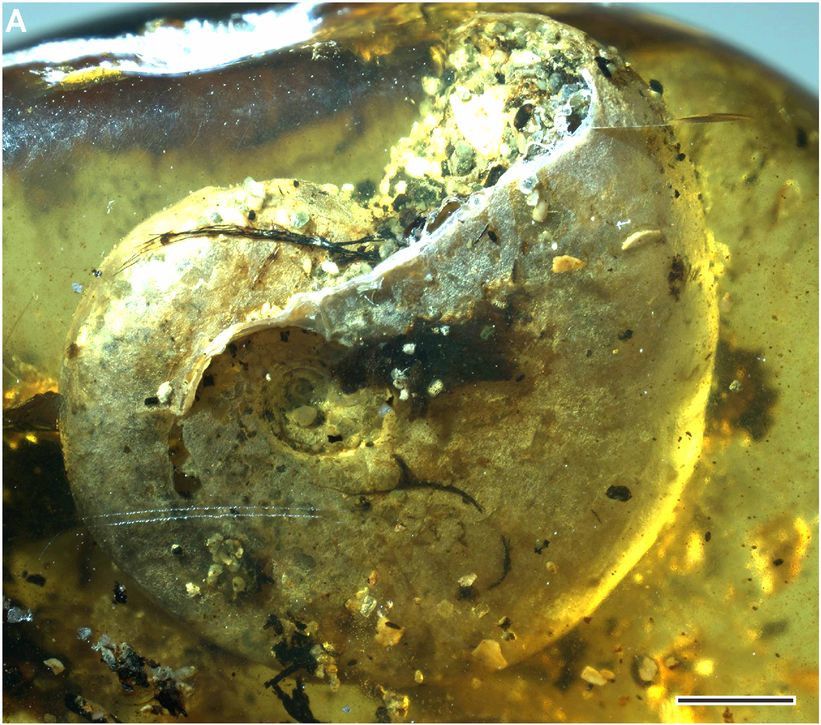
A Puzosia (Bhimaites) species juvenile shell in Burmese amber

- Dimorphic Indonesian ammonite Macrocephalites keeuwensis is reported from the core of Jara Dome (Kutch district, India) by Jain (2019).
- Description of new fossils of members of the genus Lytohoplites from the Neuquén Basin (Argentina), taxonomic revision of the Lytohoplites species occurring in this basin, and a study on the ontogeny, probable sexual dimorphism and spectrum of intraspecific variability of members of this genus, is published by Vennari & Aguirre-Urreta (2019).
- A study on the intraspecific variation through the ontogeny of the Late Cretaceous ammonite Scaphites whitfieldi from the Western Interior of the United States is published by Klein & Landman (2019).
- A lower jaw of Spathites puercoensis is described from the Turonian Carlile Member of the Mancos Shale (New Mexico, United States) by Landman et al. (2019).
- A study on periodic variations in carbon and oxygen stable isotope profiles from Campanian and Maastrichtian ammonites belonging to the genus Baculites, and on their implications for inferring the life histories of these ammonites, is published by Ellis & Tobin (2019).
- A study on the hydrostatic properties of the orthoconic morphotype of Baculites compressus and on their implications for the knowledge of the mode of life of this animal is published by Peterman et al. (2019).
- A study on the ecology and growth of baculitid and scaphitid ammonites from the Maastrichtian Owl Creek Formation (Mississippi, United States), evaluating whether these taxa may have migrated, is published by Ferguson et al. (2019).
- A study on a sutural anomaly of ammonite specimens known as sutural pseudoinversion is published by Rogov (2019).
- A study on the systematics of Late Cretaceous ammonites from the southeastern San Juan Basin (Sandoval County, New Mexico) and on the stratigraphic framework of their fossils is published by Sealey & Lucas (2019).
- A study on the ontogenetic trajectories of septal spacing between succeeding chambers in Hypophylloceras subramosum and Phyllopachyceras ezoense is published online by Iwasaki, Iwasaki & Wani (2019).
- A study on the intra- and interspecific variation and ontogenetic trajectories of the kossmaticeratid species Maorites densicostatus and Maorites seymourianus is published by Morón-Alfonso (2019).
- A pathological ammonite specimen characterized by a pronounced left-right asymmetry in both ornamentation and suture lines is described from the Toarcian of southern France by Jattiot et al. (2019).
- A study on the morphology and function of hook-like structures found in the body chambers of six specimens of Rhaeboceras halli is published online by Kruta et al. (2019).

=== New taxa ===
Name	Novelty	Status	Authors	Age	Type locality	Country	Notes	Images
Albanesiceras	Gen. et sp. nov	Valid	Galácz	Middle Jurassic (Bathonian)		Italy	A member of the family Perisphinctidae. The type species is A. damianoi.	
Albanites americanus	Sp. nov	Valid	Brayard et al.	Early Triassic		United States (Idaho)		
Allocrioceras irregulare	Sp. nov	Valid	Kennedy & Kaplan	Late Cretaceous (Turonian)		Germany		
Anagaudryceras calabozoi	Sp. nov	Valid	Raffi & Olivero in Raffi, Olivero & Milanese	Late Cretaceous (Campanian)	Cerro Toro Formation; Rabot Formation; Santa Marta Formation	Antarctica (James Ross Island); Chile		
Anagaudryceras sanctuarium	Sp. nov	Valid	Raffi & Olivero in Raffi, Olivero & Milanese	Late Cretaceous (Campanian/Maastrichtian boundary)	Snow Hill Island Formation	Antarctica (James Ross Island)		
Anagaudryceras subcompressum	Sp. nov	Valid	Raffi & Olivero in Raffi, Olivero & Milanese	Late Cretaceous (Maastrichtian)	Snow Hill Island Formation	Antarctica (James Ross Island)		
Araxoceltites	Gen. et 3 sp. nov	Valid	Korn, Ghaderi & Tabrizi	Permian (Changhsingian)		Iran	Genus includes new species A. sanestapanus, A. laterocostatus and A. cristatus.	
Araxoceras insolens	Sp. nov	Valid	Korn & Ghaderi	Permian (Wuchiapingian)		Iran		
Araxoceras truncatum	Sp. nov	Valid	Korn & Ghaderi	Permian (Wuchiapingian)		Iran		
Balearites berryae	Sp. nov	Valid	Vermeulen et al.	Early Cretaceous		Spain		
Beckeroceras	Gen. et comb. nov	Valid	Naglik, De Baets & Klug	Devonian (Emsian)	Dzhaus Beds	Uzbekistan	A member of Agoniatitida belonging to the family Mimosphinctidae. The type species is "Erbenoceras" khanakasuensis Yatskov (1990).	
Beulia	Gen. et sp. nov	Valid	Korn & Price	Devonian (Famennian)		Germany	Genus includes new species B. wunderlichi.	
Borealiceras	Gen. et comb. nov	Valid	Vermeulen et al.	Early Cretaceous		Germany	Genus includes "Crioceras" stadtlaenderi Müller (1892).	
Caribouceras	Gen. et sp. nov	Valid	Brayard et al.	Early Triassic		United States (Idaho)	Genus includes new species C. slugense.	
Carpathiceras	Gen. et comb. et sp. nov	Valid	Meister & Schlögl	Early Jurassic (Sinemurian)		Slovakia	A member of Asteroceratinae. The type species is "Coroniceras (Paracoroniceras)" bordoti Guérin-Franiatte (1966); genus also includes new species C. misiki.	
Carthaginites multituberculatus	Sp. nov	Valid	Kennedy in Gale, Kennedy & Walaszczyk	Late Cretaceous (Cenomanian)	Cauvery Basin	India	A member of the family Turrilitidae.	
Chieseiceras dolomiticum	Sp. nov	Valid	Brack & Rieber	Middle Triassic (Late Anisian)		Italy		
Chtelnicaceras	Gen. et sp. nov	Valid	Meister & Schlögl	Early Jurassic (Sinemurian)		Slovakia	An ammonite with an intermediate morphology between Arietitidae and Oxynoticeratidae. Genus includes new species C. janus.	
Damesites africanus	Sp. nov	Valid	Kennedy & Lobitzer	Late Cretaceous (Cenomanian)	Odukpani Formation	Nigeria	A member of the family Desmoceratidae.	
Docidoceras higginsi	Sp. nov	Valid	Chandler	Middle Jurassic (Bajocian)		United Kingdom		
Dzhaprakoceras brodheadense	Sp. nov	Valid	Work & Mason	Carboniferous (Tournaisian)	Borden Formation	United States (Kentucky)		
Eogunnarites? elegans	Sp. nov	Valid	Kennedy in Gale, Kennedy & Walaszczyk	Late Cretaceous (Cenomanian)	Cauvery Basin	India	A member of the family Kossmaticeratidae.	
Epophioceras nodosus	Sp. nov	Valid	Meister & Schlögl	Early Jurassic (Sinemurian)		Slovakia		
Euomphaloceras varicostatum	Sp. nov	Valid	Kennedy in Gale, Kennedy & Walaszczyk	Late Cretaceous (Cenomanian)	Cauvery Basin	India		
Falciclymenia cabrierensis	Sp. nov	Valid	Korn & Price	Late Devonian		France		
Finiclymenia czarnockii	Sp. nov	Valid	Korn & Price	Devonian (Famennian)		Central Europe	A gonioclymeniid ammonite.	
Finiclymenia langei	Sp. nov	Valid	Korn & Price	Devonian (Famennian)		Central Europe	A gonioclymeniid ammonite.	
Flickia bullata	Sp. nov	Valid	Kennedy & Lobitzer	Late Cretaceous (Cenomanian)	Odukpani Formation	Nigeria		
Follotites bighillensis	Sp. nov	Valid	Work & Mason	Carboniferous (Tournaisian)	Borden Formation	United States (Kentucky)		
Gaudryceras submurdochi	Sp. nov	Valid	Raffi & Olivero in Raffi, Olivero & Milanese	Late Cretaceous (Campanian)	Rabot Formation; Santa Marta Formation	Antarctica (James Ross Island)		
Glaphyrites taimyricus	Sp. nov	Valid	Konovalova & Borissenkov in Borissenkov, Konovalova & Kutygin	Carboniferous	Makarovskaya Formation	Russia (Krasnoyarsk Krai)		
Glaucoceras	Gen. et comb. nov	Valid	Matamales-Andreu et al.	Early Cretaceous (Hauterivian)		Spain; Switzerland	A new genus for "Baculites" renevieri Ooster (1860).	
Glyptoxoceras (?) tenuicostatum	Sp. nov	Valid	Kennedy & Kaplan	Late Cretaceous (Turonian)		Germany	A member of the family Diplomoceratidae.	
Hoevelia	Gen. et sp. nov	Valid	Korn & Price	Devonian (Famennian)		Germany	Genus includes new species H. schindewolfi.	
Homoeoplanulites todaginensis	Sp. nov	Valid	Poulton & Hall	Middle Jurassic (Callovian)		Canada (British Columbia)		
Hoploscaphites macer	Sp. nov	Valid	Landman et al.	Late Cretaceous (Maastrichtian)	Bearpaw Shale; Pierre Shale	United States (Colorado; Montana; Wyoming)		
Ivoites meshchankinae	Sp. nov	Valid	Naglik, De Baets & Klug	Devonian (Emsian)		Czech Republic; Uzbekistan	A member of Agoniatitida belonging to the family Mimosphinctidae.	
Kamerunoceras multinodosum	Sp. nov	Valid	Kennedy in Gale, Kennedy & Walaszczyk	Late Cretaceous (Turonian)	Karai Formation	India		
Kayutoceras pogrebitskyi	Sp. nov	Valid	Borissenkov & Kutygin in Borissenkov, Konovalova & Kutygin	Carboniferous	Olen'ynskaya Formation	Russia (Krasnoyarsk Krai)		
Kirsoceras arteseptatum	Sp. nov	Valid	Bockwinkel, Korn & Herd	Devonian (Famennian)		Germany		
Kirsoceras gelamenum	Sp. nov	Valid	Bockwinkel, Korn & Herd	Devonian (Famennian)		Germany		
Kitabobactrites	Gen. et sp. nov	Valid	Naglik, De Baets & Klug	Devonian (Emsian)		Czech Republic; Uzbekistan	A member of Bactritida belonging to the family Bactritidae. The type species is K. salimovae.	
Kumetaceras	Gen. et sp. nov	Valid	Galácz	Middle Jurassic (Bathonian)		Italy	A possible member of the family Spiroceratidae. The type species is K. enigmaticum.	
Kunnamiceras	Gen. et comb. nov	Valid	Kennedy in Gale, Kennedy & Walaszczyk	Late Cretaceous (Cenomanian)	Cauvery Basin	India; Madagascar	A member of the subfamily Acanthoceratinae. The type species is "Ammonites" tropicus Stoliczka (1865); genus also includes "Protacanthoceras" imperatoris Wright & Kennedy (1980).	
Latiwitchellia atacamensis	Sp. nov	Valid	Dietze & von Hillebrandt	Middle Triassic (Bajocian)		Chile		
Lissoceras maerteni	Sp. nov	Valid	Pavia & Fernandez-Lopez	Middle Jurassic (Bajocian)		France	A member of Haploceratoidea belonging to the family Lissoceratidae.	
Lissoceras maizetense	Sp. nov	Valid	Pavia & Fernandez-Lopez	Middle Jurassic (Bajocian)		France	A member of Haploceratoidea belonging to the family Lissoceratidae.	
Lissoceras ovale	Sp. nov	Valid	Pavia & Fernandez-Lopez	Middle Jurassic (Bajocian)	El Pedregal Formation	France; Germany; Hungary; Spain	A member of Haploceratoidea belonging to the family Lissoceratidae.	
Lissoceras sturanii	Sp. nov	Valid	Pavia & Fernandez-Lopez	Middle Jurassic (Bajocian)		France; Italy; Russia (Dagestan); Turkmenistan	A member of Haploceratoidea belonging to the family Lissoceratidae.	
Lissoceras submediterraneum	Sp. nov	Valid	Pavia & Fernandez-Lopez	Middle Jurassic (Bajocian)	El Pedregal Formation	France; Spain	A member of Haploceratoidea belonging to the family Lissoceratidae.	
Loyezia roberti	Sp. nov	Valid	Vermeulen et al.	Early Cretaceous (Hauterivian)		Spain	A member of the family Crioceratitidae.	
Maeneceras tabasense	Sp. nov	Valid	Korn et al.	Probably late early Famennian		Iran	A member of the family Sporadoceratidae.	
Medioclymenia media	Sp. nov	Valid	Korn & Price	Devonian (Famennian)		Central Europe	A gonioclymeniid ammonite.	
Megatirolites	Gen. et comb. nov	Valid	Balini et al.	Early Triassic (Olenekian)	Sefid-Kuh Limestone; Tartaly Formation	Iran; Kazakhstan	A member of Ceratitida belonging to the superfamily Dinaritoidea and to the family Tirolitidae. The type species is "Tirolites" rossicus Kiparisova (1947); genus also includes "Tirolites" armatus Shevyrev (1968).	
Menuites armatus	Sp. nov	Valid	Shigeta in Shigeta, Izukura & Nishimura	Late Cretaceous (Campanian)	Chinomigawa Formation	Japan	A member of the family Pachydiscidae.	
Mesodistichites	Gen. et comb. et sp. nov	Valid	Krystyn et al.	Late Triassic (Norian)	Nayband Formation	Iran	A member of Ceratitida belonging to the family Distichitidae. The type species is "Distichites" tozeri Seyed-Emami (1975); genus also includes new species M. evolutus.	
Metabactrites rakhmonovi	Sp. nov	Valid	Naglik, De Baets & Klug	Devonian (Emsian)		Uzbekistan	A member of Agoniatitida belonging to the family Mimosphinctidae.	
Microderoceras crassiornatum	Sp. nov	Valid	Meister & Schlögl	Early Jurassic (Sinemurian)		Slovakia		
Microderoceras serratum	Sp. nov	Valid	Meister & Schlögl	Early Jurassic (Sinemurian)		Slovakia		
Nelomites	Nom. nov	Valid	Bockwinkel, Korn & Herd	Devonian (Famennian)		Kazakhstan	A replacement name for Melonites Bogoslovskii (1971).	
Neophylloceras nodosum	Sp. nov	Valid	Shigeta in Shigeta, Izukura & Nishimura	Late Cretaceous (Campanian)	Chinomigawa Formation	Japan	A member of the family Phylloceratidae.	
Noridiscites nodosus	Sp. nov	Valid	Krystyn et al.	Late Triassic (Norian)	Nayband Formation	Iran	A member of Ceratitida belonging to the family Noridiscitidae.	
Oraniceras calvum	Sp. nov	Valid	Gulyaev	Middle Jurassic (Bathonian)		Russia	A member of the family Parkinsoniidae.	
Oraniceras issae	Sp. nov	Valid	Gulyaev	Middle Jurassic (Bathonian)		Russia	A member of the family Parkinsoniidae.	
Pachydiscus wrighti	Sp. nov	Valid	Kennedy	Late Cretaceous		United Kingdom		
Paracrioceras damaisi	Sp. nov	Valid	Vermeulen et al.	Early Cretaceous				
Parasolenoceras ribiraense	Sp. nov	Valid	Shigeta in Shigeta, Izukura & Nishimura	Late Cretaceous (Campanian)	Chinomigawa Formation	Japan	A member of the family Diplomoceratidae.	
Paroecotraustes minor	Sp. nov	Valid	Galácz	Middle Jurassic (Bathonian)		Italy	A member of the family Oppeliidae.	
Pernaceras	Gen. et comb. nov	Valid	Vermeulen et al.	Early Cretaceous		France	Genus includes "Ammonites" assimilis Matheron (1880).	
Phlycticeras tenue	Sp. nov	Valid	Galácz	Middle Jurassic (Bathonian)		Italy	A member of the family Strigoceratidae.	
Praechebbites	Gen. et sp. et comb. nov	Valid	Becker et al.	Devonian (Emsian)		Morocco; China? France?	A member of the family Mimosphinctidae belonging to the new subfamily Chebbitinae. The type species is P. debaetsi; genus might also include "Anetoceras (Erbenoceras)" mattei Feist (1970) and "Teicherticeras" ilanense Shen (1975).	
Prolecanites akiyoshiensis	Sp. nov	Valid	Fujikawa	Carboniferous	Akiyoshi Limestone	Japan		
Protacanthoceras parva	Sp. nov	Valid	Kennedy in Gale, Kennedy & Walaszczyk	Late Cretaceous (Cenomanian)	Cauvery Basin	India	A member of the subfamily Acanthoceratinae.	
Pseudocrassiceras	Gen. et comb et sp. nov	Valid	Rulleau & Jattiot	Early Jurassic (Toarcian)		France; Spain	A member of the family Hildoceratidae. The type species is "Ammonites" bayani Dumortier (1874); genus also includes "Ammonites" frantzi Reynès (1868), "Hildoceras" comense var. praegruneri Monestier (1931) (raised to the rank of a separate species Pseudocrassiceras praegruneri) and a new species P. arbaulti.	
Pseudosonninia	Gen. et sp. nov	Valid	Parent et al.	Middle Jurassic (Callovian)	Los Molles Formation	Argentina	A member of the family Oppeliidae. The type species is P. chacaymelehuensis.	
Puzosia (Bhimaites) falx	Sp. nov	Valid	Kennedy in Gale, Kennedy & Walaszczyk	Late Cretaceous (Cenomanian)	Cauvery Basin	India		
Schlueterella stinnesbecki	Sp. nov	Valid	Ifrim	Late Cretaceous (Turonian-Coniacian)		Mexico	A member of the family Diplomoceratidae.	
Semilissoceras	Gen. et 3 sp. et comb. nov	Valid	Pavia & Fernandez-Lopez	Middle Jurassic (Bajocian)		Algeria; France; Portugal; Spain; United Kingdom	A member of Haploceratoidea belonging to the family Lissoceratidae. The type species is S. ellipticum; genus also includes new species S. turgidulum and S. costellatum, as well as "Oppelia" depereti Flamand (1911) and "Lissoceras" semicostulatum Buckman (1923).	
Sicilisphinctes	Gen. et sp. nov	Valid	Galácz	Middle Jurassic (Bathonian)		Italy	A member of the family Perisphinctidae. The type species is S. incertus.	
Siemiradzkia mangoldi	Sp. nov	Valid	Metodiev	Middle Jurassic (Bathonian)	Bov Formation	Bulgaria France	A member of the family Perisphinctidae.	
Sikeliceras	Gen. et sp. nov	Valid	Galácz	Middle Jurassic (Bathonian)		Italy	A possible member of the family Spiroceratidae. The type species is S. costatum.	
Silesites yajimai	Sp. nov	Valid	Matsukawa	Early Cretaceous (Aptian)	Sanyama Formation	Japan		
Sokurella elshankae	Sp. nov	Valid	Gulyaev	Middle Jurassic (Bathonian)		Russia	A member of the family Parkinsoniidae.	
Sokurella pletniovkae	Sp. nov	Valid	Gulyaev	Middle Jurassic (Bathonian)		Russia	A member of the family Parkinsoniidae.	
Stephanoceras (Skirroceras) englandi	Sp. nov	Valid	Chandler	Middle Jurassic (Lower Bajocian)	Inferior Oolite Formation	United Kingdom		
Stephanoceras (Riccardiceras) eoeteosum	Sp. nov	Valid	Chandler	Middle Jurassic (Middle or Upper Aalenian)	Inferior Oolite Formation	United Kingdom		
Uptonia schlatteri	Sp. nov	Valid	Fauré & Téodori	Early Jurassic (Pliensbachian)		France		
Uzbekisphinctes	Gen. et comb. nov	Valid	Naglik, De Baets & Klug	Early Devonian	Daleje Shale; Dzhaus Beds; Middle Kaub Formation	China; Czech Republic; Germany; Uzbekistan	A member of Agoniatitida belonging to the family Mimosphinctidae. The type species is "Teicherticeras" rudicostatum Bogoslovsky (1980); genus also includes "Convoluticeras" discordans Erben (1965) and "Teicherticeras" primigenitum Erben (1965).	
Vedioceras fusiforme	Sp. nov	Valid	Korn & Ghaderi	Permian (Wuchiapingian)		Iran	A member of the family Araxoceratidae.	
Watinoceras elegans	Sp. nov	Valid	Kennedy in Gale, Kennedy & Walaszczyk	Late Cretaceous (Cenomanian)	Cauvery Basin	India		
Zelandites pujatoi	Sp. nov	Valid	Raffi, Olivero & Milanese	Late Cretaceous (Campanian)	Rabot Formation; Santa Marta Formation	Antarctica (James Ross Island)		

== Other cephalopods ==
=== Research ===
- A study on hydrostatic properties of early Paleozoic nautiloid and endoceratoid cephalopods, and on its implications for the knowledge of ecology of these cephalopods, is published by Peterman, Barton & Yacobucci (2019).
- A study on the distribution and diversity of cephalopods during the Cambrian–Ordovician transition is published by Fang et al. (2019).
- A study on cephalopod occurrences in South China and adjacent areas during the Middle to Late Ordovician, aiming to define biogeographic provinces, is published by Fang et al. (2019).
- A study on changes of geographic range size and rates of speciation and extinction in nautiloid and ammonoid cephalopods living in the North American Midcontinent Sea from the Carboniferous (Pennsylvanian)-early Permian is published by Kolis & Lieberman (2019).
- Ascocerid fossils are described from the Hirnantian?–Llandovery strata of the Eusebio Ayala and Vargas Peña formations (southeastern Paraguay) by Cichowolski et al. (2019), representing the first ascocerid record from high paleolatitudes of Gondwana.
- A juvenile specimen of Dolorthoceras, representing the first Devonian cephalopod specimen preserving nacreous structures and the first ectocochleate cephalopod preserving fibrous structures within its conch, is described from the Frasnian Domanic Formation (Russia) by Doguzhaeva (2019).
- A study on the response of cephalopod assemblages from the area of the present-day European Russia to environmental changes during the early Aptian Oceanic Anoxic Event is published by Rogov et al. (2019).
- A study on the paleobiology of cephalopods from the Albian Mahajanga Basin of Madagascar will be published by Hoffmann et al. (2019).
- A proposal for revision of the classification of nautiloid cephalopods presented in Treatise Part K is presented by King & Evans (2019), who name a new subclass Tarphyceratia, new order Rioceratida and new family Bactroceratidae.
- A study on embryonic and early juvenile development of shell in Peismoceras is published by Manda & Turek (2019).
- A study on changes of the morphological diversity of Late Permian coiled nautiloids is published online by Korn et al. (2019).
- A study on the paleobiology of Angulithes mermeti, based on new material from the upper Cenomanian of Egypt, and on its implications for the knowledge of the evolution of Cenomanian lineage of Angulithes, is published by Wilmsen & Nagm (2019).
- A study on the anatomy of Gordoniconus beargulchensis and on its implications for the knowledge of evolution of coleoids is published by Klug et al. (2019).
- A study on a putative Sinemurian octocoral Mesosceptron from Montagna del Casale (Sicily, Italy) is published by Pignatti et al. (2019), who reinterpret the fossils of this taxon as incompletely preserved coleoid rostra, and consider Mesosceptron to be a subjective junior synonym of the genus Atractites.
- A study on four specimens of Clarkeiteuthis conocauda from the Toarcian Posidonia Shale (Germany) preserved with small bony fish in their arm crowns, on the feeding behaviour of members of this species, and on the differences in the mode of life of C. conocauda, Passaloteuthis bisulcata and Hibolithes semisulcatus, is published by Jenny et al. (2019).
- A study on belemnite body-size dynamics across the Pliensbachian–Toarcian boundary in the Peniche section (Lusitanian Basin, Portugal), evaluating its implications for the knowledge of the impact of the Pliensbachian–Toarcian boundary warming event on belemnite body size, is published by Rita et al. (2019).
- New belemnite fossils are described from the Berriasian–Hauterivian of Arctic Canada and North-East Greenland by Mutterlose et al. (2019), who also evaluate the implications of these fossils for the knowledge of spatial distribution patterns of belemnites at northern high latitudes.

=== New taxa ===
Name	Novelty	Status	Authors	Age	Type locality	Country	Notes	Images
Andamanoceras	Gen. et sp. nov	Valid	Niko, Sone & Leman	Ordovician	Lower Setul Limestone	Malaysia	A member of Pseudorthocerida. Genus includes new species A. densiseptum.	
Basiloceras	Gen. et sp. nov	Valid	Pohle, Klug & Haas	Devonian (Eifelian and Givetian)		Morocco	A member of Oncocerida belonging to the family Acleistoceratidae. Genus includes new species B. goliath and B. david.	
Beloitoceras thorslundi	Sp. nov	Valid	Kröger & Aubrechtová	Late Ordovician	Kullsberg Limestone Formation	Sweden	A member of the family Oncoceratidae.	
Cabaneroceras	Gen. et sp. nov	Valid	Kröger & Gutiérrez-Marco	Ordovician (Darriwilian)		Spain	A member of Intejocerida. Genus includes new species C. aznari.	
Cameroceras motsognir	Sp. nov	Valid	Kröger & Aubrechtová	Late Ordovician	Kullsberg Limestone Formation	Sweden		
Cimomia kurkurensis	Sp. nov	Valid	Hewaidy, Qot & Moneer	Early Paleocene	Kurkur Formation	Egypt	A member of the family Hercoglossidae.	
Clothoceras	Gen. et sp. nov	Valid	Kröger & Aubrechtová	Late Ordovician	Kullsberg Limestone Formation	Sweden	A member of the family Proteoceratidae. Genus includes new species C. thornquisti.	
Danoceras skalbergensis	Sp. nov	Valid	Kröger & Aubrechtová	Late Ordovician	Kullsberg Limestone Formation	Sweden		
Deltoidonautilus hassani	Sp. nov	Valid	Hewaidy, Qot & Moneer	Late Paleocene	Tarawan Formation	Egypt	A member of the family Hercoglossidae.	
Dicoelites aprilis	Sp. nov	Valid	Dzyuba in Dzyuba, Mitta & Sherstyukov	Middle Jurassic (Bajocian)	Djangura Formation	Russia (Karachay-Cherkessia)	A belemnite.	
Dicoelites octobris	Sp. nov	Valid	Dzyuba in Dzyuba, Mitta & Sherstyukov	Middle Jurassic (Bajocian)	Djangura Formation	Russia (Karachay-Cherkessia)	A belemnite.	
Discoceras amtjaernense	Sp. nov	Valid	Kröger & Aubrechtová	Late Ordovician	Kullsberg Limestone Formation	Sweden		
Discoceras nilssoni	Sp. nov	Valid	Kröger & Aubrechtová	Late Ordovician	Kullsberg Limestone Formation	Sweden		
Endoceras naekki	Sp. nov	Valid	Kröger & Aubrechtová	Late Ordovician	Kullsberg Limestone Formation	Sweden		
Engeseriteuthis	Gen. et sp. nov	Valid	Fuchs et al.	Late Jurassic (late Kimmeridgian to ?early Tithonian)	Geisental Formation	Germany	A member of Muensterelloidea. Genus includes new species E. arcuatus.	
Eromangateuthis	Gen. et comb. nov	Valid	Fuchs	Early Cretaceous (Albian)	Allaru Formation	Australia	A member of Octobrachia belonging to the family Plesioteuthidae; a new genus for "Boreopeltis" soniae Wade (1993).	
Etchesia	Gen. et sp. nov	Valid	Fuchs	Late Jurassic (Tithonian)	Kimmeridge Clay Formation	United Kingdom	A member of Coleoidea belonging to the family Muensterellidae. Genus includes new species E. martilli.	
Furudaloceras	Gen. et sp. nov	Valid	Kröger & Aubrechtová	Late Ordovician	Kullsberg Limestone Formation	Sweden	A member of the family Cyrtogomphoceratidae. Genus includes new species F. tomtei.	
Grafordites	Gen. et sp. nov	Valid	Niko & Mapes	Carboniferous (Kasimovian)	Graford Formation	United States (Texas)	A member of the family Dentoceratidae. The type species is G. mcleodi.	
Gujiaonautilus	Gen. et sp. nov	Valid	Miao et al.	Permian (Changhsingian)	Dalong Formation	China	A nautiloid. Genus includes new species G. longliensis.	
Isbergoceras	Gen. et 2 sp. nov	Valid	Kröger & Aubrechtová	Late Ordovician	Kullsberg Limestone Formation	Sweden	A member of the family Graciloceratidae. The type species is I. niger; genus also includes I. consobrinum.	
Isorthoceras nikwis	Sp. nov	Valid	Kröger & Aubrechtová	Late Ordovician	Kullsberg Limestone Formation	Sweden	A member of the family Proteoceratidae.	
Isorthoceras sylphide	Sp. nov	Valid	Kröger & Aubrechtová	Late Ordovician	Kullsberg Limestone Formation	Sweden	A member of the family Proteoceratidae.	
Isorthoceras urdr	Sp. nov	Valid	Kröger & Aubrechtová	Late Ordovician	Kullsberg Limestone Formation	Sweden	A member of the family Proteoceratidae.	
Kullsbergoceras	Gen. et sp. nov	Valid	Kröger & Aubrechtová	Late Ordovician	Kullsberg Limestone Formation	Sweden	A member of the family Cyrtogomphoceratidae. Genus includes new species K. nissei.	
Lambeoceras (Lambeoceras) balashovi	Sp. nov	Valid	Barskov & Marek	Ordovician (Katian)		Russia		
Lambeoceras (Lambeoceras) hanae	Sp. nov	Valid	Barskov & Marek	Ordovician (Katian)		Russia		
Lambeoceras (Lambeoceras) sibiricum	Sp. nov	Valid	Barskov & Marek	Ordovician (Katian)		Russia		
Langgunites	Gen. et sp. nov	Valid	Niko, Sone & Leman	Ordovician	Lower Setul Limestone	Malaysia	A member of Pseudorthocerida. Genus includes new species L. mucronulatus.	
Malayorthoceras	Gen. et sp. nov	Valid	Niko, Sone & Leman	Ordovician	Lower Setul Limestone	Malaysia	A member of Orthocerida. Genus includes new species M. gracilentum.	
Muensterella jillae	Sp. nov	Valid	Fuchs et al.	Late Cretaceous (Turonian)	South Bosque Formation	United States (Texas)		
Muensterella spinosa	Sp. nov	Valid	Fuchs et al.	Late Jurassic (Tithonian)	Mörnsheim Formation	Germany		
Muensterellina	Gen. et sp. nov	Valid	Fuchs et al.	Middle Jurassic (Callovian)	Oxford Clay Formation	United Kingdom	A member of Muensterelloidea. Genus includes new species M. johnjagti.	
Neotainoceras zhaoi	Sp. nov	Valid	Miao et al.	Permian (Changhsingian)	Dalong Formation	China	A nautiloid.	
Nodopleuroceras gujiaoense	Sp. nov	Valid	Miao et al.	Permian (Changhsingian)	Dalong Formation	China	A nautiloid.	
Ordogeisonoceras uppsalaensis	Sp. nov	Valid	Kröger & Aubrechtová	Late Ordovician	Kullsberg Limestone Formation	Sweden	A member of the family Geisonoceratidae.	
Sepia vandervoorti	Sp. nov	Valid	Košťák, Jagt & Schlögl	Miocene (late Langhian–earliest Serravallian)	Köselerli Formation	Turkey	A species of Sepia.	
Shanthaiceras	Gen. et sp. nov	Valid	Niko, Sone & Leman	Ordovician	Lower Setul Limestone	Malaysia	A member of Pseudorthocerida. Genus includes new species S. amplum.	
Sibumasuoceras kilimense	Sp. nov	Valid	Niko, Sone & Leman	Ordovician	Lower Setul Limestone	Malaysia	A member of Pseudorthocerida.	
Sibumasuoceras scrivenori	Sp. nov	Valid	Niko, Sone & Leman	Ordovician	Lower Setul Limestone	Malaysia	A member of Pseudorthocerida.	
Tafadnatoceras	Gen. et sp. nov	In press	Ebbestad et al.	Late Ordovician	Upper Tiouririne Formation	Morocco	A member of Orthocerida belonging to the family Stereoplasmoceratidae. The type species is T. tiouririnense. Announced in 2019; the final version of the article naming it is not published yet.	
Tofangoceras kedahense	Sp. nov	Valid	Niko, Sone & Leman	Ordovician	Lower Setul Limestone	Malaysia	A member of Orthocerida.	
Tofangoceras rayense	Sp. nov	Valid	Niko, Sone & Leman	Ordovician	Lower Setul Limestone	Malaysia	A member of Orthocerida.	
Tofangoceras staiti	Sp. nov	Valid	Niko, Sone & Leman	Ordovician	Lower Setul Limestone	Malaysia	A member of Orthocerida.	
Tyrionella	Gen. et sp. nov	Valid	Fuchs et al.	Late Jurassic (Tithonian)	Altmühltal Formation	Germany	A member of Muensterelloidea. Genus includes new species T. fauseri.	
Valkyrioceras	Gen. et sp. nov	Valid	Kröger & Aubrechtová	Late Ordovician	Kullsberg Limestone Formation	Sweden	A member of the family Valcouroceratidae. Genus includes new species V. dalecarlia.	
Wadema tattai	Sp. nov	In press	Ebbestad et al.	Late Ordovician	Upper Ktaoua Formation	Morocco	A member of Actinocerida belonging to the family Wademidae. Announced in 2019; the final version of the article naming it is not published yet.	

== Gastropods ==
=== Research ===
- A study on the diversity of gastropod larval conch fossil assemblages of ages ranging from the Ordovician to Carboniferous is published online by Dzik (2019).
- A study on the recovery of gastropods in the aftermath of the Cretaceous–Paleogene extinction event, based on data from fossils from the former Ankerpoort-Curfs quarry (Geulhem, the Netherlands), is published online by Vellekoop et al. (2019).
- A probable cyclophoroidean gastropod, possibly a member of the family Cyclophoridae, is described from the Cretaceous amber from Myanmar by Xing et al. (2019), constituting the first confirmed and oldest record of soft-bodied preservation of a snail in Cretaceous amber.
- A study on the nature of the size dimorphism in the Miocene gastropod Persististrombus deperditus, and on the causes of its evolution, is published by Halder & Paira (2019).
- New specimens of Spinucella reimersi are described from the Miocene Gram Clay of Denmark by Schnetler (2019), who also provides an emended description of this species.
- A revision of extant and Neogene members of the genus Antistreptus from the southwestern Atlantic Ocean is published by Pastorino & Griffin (2019).

=== New taxa ===
Name	Novelty	Status	Authors	Age	Type locality	Country	Notes	Images
Acirsa torensis	Sp. nov	Valid	Hansen	Cretaceous-Paleogene boundary		Denmark	A species of Acirsa.	
Acmaea selandica	Sp. nov	Valid	Hansen	Cretaceous-Paleogene boundary		Denmark	A species of Acmaea.	
Actinella fecundaerrata	Nom. nov	Valid	Teixeira et al.	Quaternary		Madeira	A species of Actinella.	
Agaronia almaghribensis	Sp. nov	Valid	Pacaud & Lebrun	Eocene (Lutetian)		Morocco	A species of Agaronia.	
Ageria laxa	Sp. nov	Valid	Hansen	Cretaceous-Paleogene boundary		Denmark		
Ageria skeldervigensis	Sp. nov	Valid	Hansen	Cretaceous-Paleogene boundary		Denmark		
Allmonia	Gen. et comb. nov	Valid	Harzhauser & Landau	Oligocene (Rupelian) to Miocene (Tortonian)		Algeria; Austria; Belgium; Bosnia and Herzegovina; Bulgaria; Czech Republic; France; Germany; Greece; Hungary; India; Iran; Italy; Netherlands; Pakistan; Portugal; Slovakia; Slovenia; Switzerland; Turkey	A member of the family Turritellidae. The type species is "Turritella" cathedralis Brongniart (1823); genus also includes several European Cenozoic species previously placed in Protoma.	
Allossospira	Gen. et comb. nov	In press	Ebbestad et al.	Late Ordovician	Upper Ktaoua Formation	Morocco	A member of the family Gosseletinidae belonging to the subfamily Euryzoninae. The type species is "Lophospira" debganensis Horný (1997). Announced in 2019; the final version of the article naming it is not published yet.	
Alvania amphitrite	Sp. nov	Valid	Thivaiou, Harzhauser & Koskeridou	Miocene (Aquitanian)	Pentalofos Formation	Greece	A species of Alvania.	
Amaea alicae	Sp. nov	Valid	Hansen	Cretaceous-Paleogene boundary		Denmark		
Amaea stevniensis	Sp. nov	Valid	Hansen	Cretaceous-Paleogene boundary		Denmark		
Amaurellina ravni	Sp. nov	Valid	Hansen	Cretaceous-Paleogene boundary		Denmark		
Amaurotoma? multispirata	Sp. nov	Valid	Ketwetsuriya, Cook & Nützel	Permian (Wordian)	Ratburi Group	Thailand	A member of the family Trochonematidae.	
Ananias belaensis	Sp. nov	Valid	Mazaev	Early Permian		Russia	A member of the family Eotomariidae.	
Ananias bashkiriensis	Sp. nov	Valid	Mazaev	Early Permian		Russia	A member of the family Eotomariidae.	
Anematina indiscreta	Sp. nov	Valid	Mazaev	Early Permian		Russia	A member of the family Elasmonematidae.	
Aneudaronia	Gen. et sp. nov	Valid	Guzhov	Jurassic		Russia	A member of the family Stuoraxidae. Genus includes new species A. elegans.	
Anomphalus glaucus	Sp. nov	Valid	Mazaev	Early Permian		Russia		
Apachella rugosa	Sp. nov	Valid	Mazaev	Early Permian		Russia	A member of the family Eotomariidae.	
Aphera chattica	Sp. nov	Valid	Lozouet	Oligocene (Chattian)		France	A species of Aphera.	
Aquitanobursa	Gen. et comb. nov	Valid	Sanders, Merle & Puillandre	Oligocene (Rupelian) to early Pliocene		Dominican Republic; France; Italy; Pakistan; Venezuela; United States?	A member of the family Bursidae. The type species is "Ranella" grateloupi d'Orbigny (1852); genus also includes "Bursa" amphitrites Maury (1917), "Apollon" inaequicrenatus Cossmann & Peyrot (1924), "Ranella" morrisi d'Archiac & Haime (1853), "Ranella" tuberosa Grateloup (1833) and possibly also "Bursa (Bufonariella)" chipolana Schmelz (1997).	
Archaeocyclotus	Gen. et sp. nov	Valid	Asato & Hirano in Hirano et al.	Late Cretaceous (Cenomanian)	Burmese amber	Myanmar	A member of the family Cyclophoridae. The type species is A. plicatula.	Archaeocyclotus plicatula
Archimediella carpathica	Sp. nov	Valid	Harzhauser & Landau	Middle Miocene		Austria; Bosnia and Herzegovina; Hungary; Poland; Romania; Slovakia	A member of the family Turritellidae.	
Arene jakobseni	Sp. nov	Valid	Hansen	Cretaceous-Paleogene boundary		Denmark	A species of Arene.	
Argentisioliella	Gen. et sp. nov	Valid	Miquel	Early Pliocene	Irene Formation	Argentina	A member of the family Cochliopidae. Genus includes new species A. pardignasi.	
Arribazona seleukensis	Sp. nov	Valid	Mazaev	Early Permian		Russia	A member of the family Orthonematidae.	
Ascheria salina	Sp. nov	Valid	Kiel et al.	Early Oligocene	Talara Basin	Peru	A member of the family Hokkaidoconchidae.	
Ataphrus knoesensis	Sp. nov	Valid	Hansen	Cretaceous-Paleogene boundary		Denmark		
Athleta benoisti	Sp. nov	Valid	Lozouet	Oligocene (Chattian)		France	A species of Athleta.	
Athleta confusus	Sp. nov	Valid	Lozouet	Oligocene (Chattian)		France	A species of Athleta.	
Athleta maculosus	Sp. nov	Valid	Lozouet	Miocene		France	A species of Athleta.	
Athleta memoirae	Sp. nov	Valid	Lozouet	Oligocene (Chattian)		France	A species of Athleta.	
Athleta peyreirensis	Sp. nov	Valid	Lozouet	Oligocene (Chattian)		France	A species of Athleta.	
Attiliosa gallica	Sp. nov	Valid	Landau et al.	Miocene (Tortonian)		France	A species of Attiliosa.	
Attiliosa pouweri	Sp. nov	Valid	Landau et al.	Miocene (Tortonian)		France	A species of Attiliosa.	
Auritoma	Gen. et sp. nov	Valid	Szabó et al.	Jurassic		Italy	Genus includes new species A. lenticula.	
Bandelzyga	Gen. et sp. nov	Valid	Mazaev	Early Permian		Russia	A member of the family Pseudozygopleuridae. Genus includes new species B. elegans.	
Bathrotomaria jakobseni	Sp. nov	Valid	Hansen	Cretaceous-Paleogene boundary		Denmark		
Bayania falconneti	Sp. nov	Valid	Pacaud	Paleogene		France		
Baylea longispira	Sp. nov	Valid	Mazaev	Permian		China; Russia	A member of the family Lophospiridae.	
Bellazona acuta	Sp. nov	Valid	Mazaev	Early Permian		Russia		
Bellerophon shakhtauensis	Sp. nov	Valid	Mazaev	Early Permian		Russia		
Birgella burchi	Sp. nov	Valid	Naranjo-García & Aguillón in Vega et al.	Late Cretaceous (late Campanian)	Cerro del Pueblo Formation	Mexico	A member of the family Hydrobiidae.	
Bleytonella saalensis	Sp. nov	Valid	Gründel, Keupp & Lang	Late Jurassic (Kimmeridgian)		Germany	A member of the family Pickworthiidae.	
Bobellis	Gen. et sp. nov	Valid	Peel	Early Silurian	Samuelsen Høj Formation	Greenland	A member of Euomphaloidea belonging to the family Pycnomphalidae. The type species is B. oliveri.	
Bocourtia (Kuschelenia?) bonariensis	Sp. nov	Valid	Miquel	Early Pliocene	Irene Formation	Argentina	A member of the family Bulimulidae.	
Bolicharewia	Gen. et sp. et comb. nov	Valid	Mazaev	Early Permian		Russia	A member of the family Anomphalidae. Genus includes new species B. edita, as well as "Anomphalus" straparoliformis Mazaev (1997).	
Bonellitia cryptica	Sp. nov	Valid	Lozouet	Oligocene (Chattian)		France	A species of Bonellitia.	
Bonellitia peyroti	Sp. nov	Valid	Lozouet	Oligocene (Chattian)		France	A species of Bonellitia.	
Boreomica costaspiralis	Sp. nov	Valid	Gründel, Keupp & Lang	Late Jurassic (Kimmeridgian)		Germany	A member of Rissooidea belonging to the family Palaeorissoinidae.	
Busambrella	Gen. et sp. nov	Valid	Szabó et al.	Jurassic		Italy	Genus includes new species B. fasciata.	
Buvignieria convexa	Sp. nov	Valid	Gründel, Keupp & Lang	Late Jurassic (Kimmeridgian)		Germany	A member of Rissooidea belonging to the family Palaeorissoinidae.	
Buvignieria racitana	Sp. nov	Valid	Gründel, Keupp & Lang	Late Jurassic (Kimmeridgian)		Germany	A member of Rissooidea belonging to the family Palaeorissoinidae.	
Callispira taosiformis	Sp. nov	Valid	Mazaev	Early Permian		Russia	A member of the family Sinuspiridae.	
Calyptraea baldii	Sp. nov	Valid	Vicián, Kovács & Stein	Late Oligocene – early Miocene		Hungary	A species of Calyptraea.	
Ceratia rodvigensis	Sp. nov	Valid	Hansen	Cretaceous-Paleogene boundary		Denmark	A species of Ceratia.	
Cerion uva gouldi	Subsp. nov	Valid	Harasewych	Pleistocene		Aruba	A subspecies of Cerion uva.	
Cerithiella selandica	Sp. nov	Valid	Hansen	Cretaceous-Paleogene boundary		Denmark	A species of Cerithiella.	
Cerithiopsis restemlongis	Sp. nov	Valid	Hansen	Cretaceous-Paleogene boundary		Denmark	A species of Cerithiopsis.	
Chartronella belaensis	Sp. nov	Valid	Szabó & Jaitly	Middle Jurassic (Callovian)	Chari Formation	India	A member of the family Paraturbinidae.	
Chelotia pervicina	Sp. nov	Valid	Berezovsky & Pacaud	Middle Eocene		Ukraine	A member of the family Pleurotomariidae.	
Chlorozyga asiatica	Sp. nov	Valid	Ketwetsuriya, Cook & Nützel	Permian (Wordian)	Ratburi Group	Thailand	A member of the family Imoglobidae.	
Chriskingia	Gen. et comb. nov	Valid	Janssen & Wilson	Miocene		Dominican Republic; Trinidad and Tobago	A member of the family Atlantidae; a new genus for "Atlanta" rotundata Gabb (1873).	
Clavatula danuvii	Sp. nov	Valid	Vicián, Kovács & Stein	Late Oligocene – early Miocene		Hungary	A species of Clavatula.	
Clavilithes tamdakhtensis	Nom. nov	Valid	Pacaud & Lebrun	Eocene (Lutetian)		Morocco	A species of Clavilithes.	
Claviscala minor	Sp. nov	Valid	Hansen	Cretaceous-Paleogene boundary		Denmark		
Cleopatra adami	Nom. nov	Valid	Neiber & Glaubrecht	Early Pleistocene	Kaiso Series	Uganda	A species of Cleopatra; a replacement name for Viviparus cylindricus Adam (1957).	
Clithon (Pictoneritina) coeuvrensis	Sp. nov	Valid	Vrinat	Eocene (Ypresian)		France	A species of Clithon.	
Clithon (Pictoneritina) occultatus	Sp. nov	Valid	Vrinat	Eocene (Ypresian)		France	A species of Clithon.	
Clithon (Pictoneritina) tigrinus	Sp. nov	Valid	Vrinat	Eocene (Ypresian)		France	A species of Clithon.	
Cochlis odovychenorum	Sp. nov	Valid	Pedriali, Sosso & Dell'Angelo	Miocene		Ukraine	A member of the family Naticidae.	
Cochlis ukrainensis	Sp. nov	Valid	Pedriali, Sosso & Dell'Angelo	Miocene		Ukraine	A member of the family Naticidae.	
Coninoda strekwera	Sp. nov	Valid	Gründel, Keupp & Lang	Late Jurassic (Kimmeridgian)		Germany	A member of the family Eustomatidae.	
Coniscala umbilica	Sp. nov	Valid	Hansen	Cretaceous-Paleogene boundary		Denmark		
Contortia grateloupi	Sp. nov	Valid	Lozouet	Oligocene (Chattian)		France	A member of the family Cancellariidae.	
Contortia intermedia	Sp. nov	Valid	Lozouet	Oligocene (Chattian)		France	A member of the family Cancellariidae.	
Contortia zitae	Sp. nov	Valid	Vicián, Kovács & Stein	Late Oligocene – early Miocene		Hungary	A member of the family Cancellariidae.	
Coptostylus harzhauseri	Nom. nov	Valid	Pacaud	Paleogene		France		
Coroniopsis mortoni	Sp. nov	Valid	Tracey & Craig in Tracey, Craig & Gain	Eocene (Lutetian)	Selsey Formation	United Kingdom	A member of the family Turridae.	
Cosmocerithium veliger	Sp. nov	Valid	Guzhov	Late Jurassic		Russia	A member of the family Cerithiopsidae.	
Cossmannina alfischeri	Sp. nov	Valid	Foster et al.	Early Triassic		China		
Cranopsis cretacea	Sp. nov	Valid	Hansen	Cretaceous-Paleogene boundary		Denmark	A species of Cranopsis.	
Cristalloella (Wonwalica) permica	Sp. nov	Valid	Mazaev	Early Permian		Russia	A member of the family Tofanellidae.	
Cryptaulax? parvum	Sp. nov	Valid	Gründel, Keupp & Lang	Late Jurassic (Kimmeridgian)		Germany	A member of Cerithioidea belonging to the family Cryptaulacidae.	
Cryptaulax? triangulare	Sp. nov	Valid	Gründel, Keupp & Lang	Late Jurassic (Kimmeridgian)		Germany	A member of Cerithioidea belonging to the family Cryptaulacidae.	
Cryptoptyxis rarenodosa	Sp. nov	Valid	Gründel, Keupp & Lang	Late Jurassic (Kimmeridgian)		Germany	A member of the family Maoraxidae.	
Cylichna stevniensis	Sp. nov	Valid	Hansen	Cretaceous-Paleogene boundary		Denmark	A species of Cylichna.	
Cyllene satoi	Sp. nov	Valid	Amano	Late Pliocene	Tentokuji Formation	Japan	A species of Cyllene.	
Cypraeorbis nadaii	Sp. nov	Valid	Vicián, Kovács & Stein	Late Oligocene – early Miocene		Hungary	A cowry.	
Cystiscus pseudobrevis	Sp. nov	Valid	Lozouet	Oligocene (Chattian)		France	A species of Cystiscus.	
Dalliella elisae	Sp. nov	Valid	Pacaud	Paleogene		France		
Denticulofusus	Gen. et comb. nov	Valid	Vermeij & Pacaud	Eocene (Lutetian and Priabonian)		France	A member of the family Columbariidae. The type species is "Fusus" gothicus Deshayes (1834); genus also includes "Coluzea" cavelieri Gain & Le Renard (2017) and "Coluzea" monicae Belliard, Gain & Le Renard (2017).	
Dentimargo salvani	Sp. nov	Valid	Pacaud & Lebrun	Eocene (Lutetian)		Morocco	A species of Dentimargo.	
Dictyotomaria balabanovi	Sp. nov	Valid	Mazaev	Early Permian		Russia	A member of the family Phymatopleuridae.	
Discula cameroni	Sp. nov	Valid	Teixeira et al.	Quaternary		Madeira	A species of Discula.	
Discula polymorpha docaensis	Subsp. nov	Valid	Teixeira et al.	Quaternary		Madeira		
Doggerostra riedeli affinis	Subsp. nov	Valid	Guzhov	Late Jurassic		Russia	A member of Heterobranchia of uncertain phylogenetic placement.	
Dolicholatirus lorenzi	Sp. nov	Valid	Hansen	Cretaceous-Paleogene boundary		Denmark	A species of Dolicholatirus.	
Donaldina erwini	Sp. nov	Valid	Foster et al.	Early Triassic		China		
Dragonia	Gen. et 2 sp. nov	Valid	Guzhov	Late Jurassic		Russia	A member of the family Cerithiopsidae. Genus includes new species D. minuta and D. longa.	
Eirlysia reticulatiformis	Sp. nov	Valid	Mazaev	Early Permian		Russia	A member of the family Phymatopleuridae.	
Elymicyclus	Gen. et 4 sp. nov	Valid	Szabó et al.	Jurassic		Italy	Genus includes new species E. alternatus, E. ietumensis, E. martae and E. garibaldii.	
Emarginula acutidens	Sp. nov	Valid	Szabó et al.	Jurassic		Italy	A species of Emarginula.	
Emarginula burgioi	Sp. nov	Valid	Szabó et al.	Jurassic		Italy	A species of Emarginula.	
Engina brunettii	Sp. nov	Valid	Landau, Ceulemans & Van Dingenen	Miocene (Tortonian)		France	A species of Engina.	
Eoplatyzona ratchaburiensis	Sp. nov	Valid	Ketwetsuriya, Cook & Nützel	Permian (Wordian)	Ratburi Group	Thailand	A member of the family Gosseletinidae.	
Eopleurotoma bella	Sp. nov	Valid	Tracey & Craig in Tracey, Craig & Gain	Eocene (Lutetian)		France	A species of Eopleurotoma.	
Eopleurotoma bicincta	Sp. nov	Valid	Tracey & Craig in Tracey, Craig & Gain	Eocene (Lutetian)		France	A species of Eopleurotoma.	
Eopleurotoma boxleyi	Sp. nov	Valid	Tracey & Craig in Tracey, Craig & Gain	Eocene (Lutetian)		France	A species of Eopleurotoma.	
Eopleurotoma christinae	Sp. nov	Valid	Tracey & Craig in Tracey, Craig & Gain	Eocene (Lutetian)		France	A species of Eopleurotoma.	
Eopleurotoma hastula	Sp. nov	Valid	Tracey & Craig in Tracey, Craig & Gain	Eocene (Lutetian)		France	A species of Eopleurotoma.	
Eopleurotoma scitula	Sp. nov	Valid	Tracey & Craig in Tracey, Craig & Gain	Eocene (Lutetian)		France	A species of Eopleurotoma.	
Eopleurotoma vauvillensis	Sp. nov	Valid	Tracey & Craig in Tracey, Craig & Gain	Eocene (Lutetian)		France	A species of Eopleurotoma.	
Eovoluta adegokei	Nom. nov	Valid	Pacaud & Lebrun	Eocene (Lutetian)		Morocco		
Epalxis symondsi	Sp. nov	Valid	Tracey & Craig in Tracey, Craig & Gain	Eocene (Lutetian)		France	A species of Epalxis.	
Epalxis toddi	Sp. nov	Valid	Tracey & Craig in Tracey, Craig & Gain	Eocene (Lutetian)		France	A species of Epalxis.	
Episcomitra silvae	Sp. nov	Valid	Landau, Ceulemans & Van Dingenen	Miocene (Tortonian)		France	A species of Episcomitra.	
Euthria presselierensis	Sp. nov	Valid	Landau, Ceulemans & Van Dingenen	Miocene (Tortonian)		France	A species of Euthria.	
Exelissa indiana	Sp. nov	Valid	Szabó & Jaitly	Middle Jurassic (Callovian)	Gadhada Formation	India	A member of the family Cryptaulacidae.	
Epalxis? rosenkrantzi	Sp. nov	Valid	Hansen	Cretaceous-Paleogene boundary		Denmark	Transferred to the genus Fusulculus by Pacaud (2020), who coined a replacement name Fusulculus hanseni.	
Epetrium skeldervigensis	Sp. nov	Valid	Hansen	Cretaceous-Paleogene boundary		Denmark		
Epitonium (Epitonium) zhuoi	Sp. nov	Valid	Yu, Wang & Jarzembowski	Late Cretaceous (Cenomanian	Burmese amber	Myanmar	A gastropod of uncertain phylogenetic placement. Originally described as a species of Epitonium; Neubauer et al. (2019) transferred this species to the pupinid genus Pseudopomatias.	
Epitonium (Papyriscala) lyui	Sp. nov	Valid	Yu, Wang & Jarzembowski	Late Cretaceous (Cenomanian	Burmese amber	Myanmar	A gastropod of uncertain phylogenetic placement. Originally described as a species of Epitonium; Neubauer et al. (2019) transferred this species to the pupinid genus Pseudopomatias.	
Euconospira skuini	Sp. nov	Valid	Mazaev	Early Permian		Russia	A member of the family Phymatopleuridae.	
Eucyclomphalus? marenostrum	Sp. nov	Valid	Szabó et al.	Jurassic		Italy		
Eucycloscala gracilicostatus	Sp. nov	Valid	Hansen	Cretaceous-Paleogene boundary		Denmark		
Euspira jhuraensis	Sp. nov	Valid	Das et al.	Uncertain; Late Jurassic or Miocene		India	A species of Euspira.	
Euspira lakhaparensis	Sp. nov	Valid	Das et al.	Uncertain; Late Jurassic or Miocene		India	A species of Euspira.	
Euspira sirenkoi	Sp. nov	Valid	Pedriali, Sosso & Dell'Angelo	Miocene		Ukraine	A species of Euspira.	
Euthema hesoana	Sp. nov	Valid	Asato & Hirano in Hirano et al.	Late Cretaceous (Cenomanian)	Burmese amber	Myanmar	A member of the family Diplommatinidae.	Euthema hesoana
Falsobuvigna	Gen. et sp. nov	Valid	Gründel, Keupp & Lang	Late Jurassic (Kimmeridgian)		Germany	A member of Rissooidea belonging to the new family Falsobuvignidae. The type species is F. peregrina.	
Fischeriella sicula	Sp. nov	Valid	Szabó et al.	Jurassic		Italy		
Fissurella? stantoni	Sp. nov	Valid	Powell & Geiger	Miocene	Topanga Canyon Formation	United States (California)	A member of the family Fissurellidae.	
Fusimorio salbriacensis	Sp. nov	Valid	Lozouet	Miocene		France	A member of the family Cancellariidae.	
Fusinus schnetleri	Sp. nov	Valid	Hansen	Cretaceous-Paleogene boundary		Denmark	A species of Fusinus.	
Garviea craccoi	Sp. nov	Valid	Zamberlan & Checchi	Eocene (late Ypresian/early Lutetian)		Italy	A member of the family Cypraeidae belonging to the subfamily Gisortiinae.	
Gemmula garviei	Sp. nov	Valid	Tracey & Craig in Tracey, Craig & Gain	Eocene (Lutetian)		France	A species of Gemmula.	
Gemmula tuckeri	Sp. nov	Valid	Tracey & Craig in Tracey, Craig & Gain	Eocene (Lutetian)		France	A species of Gemmula.	
Gemmulopsis	Gen. et sp. nov	Valid	Tracey & Craig in Tracey, Craig & Gain	Eocene (Lutetian)		France	A member of the family Turridae. The type species is G. nigellensis.	
Gibberula amurakucensis	Sp. nov	Valid	Pacaud & Lebrun	Eocene (Lutetian)		Morocco	A species of Gibberula.	
Gibberula bezoyensis	Sp. nov	Valid	Lozouet	Oligocene (Chattian)		France	A species of Gibberula.	
Gibberula ligeriana	Sp. nov	Valid	Landau, Ceulemans & Van Dingenen	Miocene (Tortonian)		France	A species of Gibberula.	
Gibberula pseudoaquitanica	Sp. nov	Valid	Lozouet	Oligocene (Chattian)		France	A species of Gibberula.	
Gibberula subovulatoides	Sp. nov	Valid	Lozouet	Oligocene (Chattian)		France	A species of Gibberula.	
Girtyspira oblonga	Sp. nov	Valid	Mazaev	Early Permian		Russia	A member of the family Meekospiridae.	
Globodoma magna	Sp. nov	Valid	Mazaev	Early Permian		Russia	A member of the family Gosseletinidae. Originally described as a species of Globodoma, but subsequently transferred to the genus Nemaspira.	
Goniasma gerasimovi	Sp. nov	Valid	Mazaev	Early Permian		Russia	A member of the family Goniasmatidae.	
Goniobasis unilirata	Sp. nov	Valid	Naranjo-García & Aguillón in Vega et al.	Late Cretaceous (late Campanian)	Cerro del Pueblo Formation	Mexico	A member of the family Pleuroceridae.	
Gymnocerithium? convexoconcavum	Sp. nov	Valid	Gründel, Keupp & Lang	Late Jurassic (Kimmeridgian)		Germany	Originally described as a member of Campaniloidea belonging to the family Gymnocerithiidae and tentatively assigned to the genus Gymnocerithium; subsequently transferred to the superfamily Cerithioidea and to the genus Neuburgensia by Gründel & Nützel (2024).	
Gyrodes mahalanobisi	Sp. nov	Valid	Das et al.	Uncertain; Late Jurassic or Miocene		India	A member of the family Naticidae.	
Haitia taylori	Sp. nov	Valid	Naranjo-García & Aguillón in Vega et al.	Late Cretaceous (late Campanian)	Cerro del Pueblo Formation	Mexico	A member of the family Physidae.	
Harmatia tokodensis	Sp. nov	Valid	Kovács & Vicián	Eocene		Hungary	A member of the family Muricidae.	
Hemicerithium perrettai	Sp. nov	Valid	Pacaud	Eocene		United Kingdom		
Hesperiella cyrtocostata	Sp. nov	Valid	Ketwetsuriya, Cook & Nützel	Permian (Wordian)	Ratburi Group	Thailand	A member of the family Porcelliidae.	
Heteronatica	Gen. et sp. nov	Valid	Guzhov	Jurassic		Russia	A member of the family Cornirostridae. Genus includes new species H. globosa.	
Hinea gaellae	Sp. nov	Valid	Pacaud	Paleogene		France	A species of Hinea.	
Hirsuticyclus	Gen. et sp. nov	Valid	Neubauer, Xing & Jochum	Late Cretaceous (Cenomanian)	Burmese amber	Myanmar	A member of the family Cyclophoridae. The type species is H. electrum.	
Holospira thompsoni	Sp. nov	Valid	Naranjo-García & Aguillón in Vega et al.	Late Cretaceous (late Campanian)	Cerro del Pueblo Formation	Mexico	A species of Holospira.	
Homalopoma acaste	Sp. nov	Valid	Thivaiou, Harzhauser & Koskeridou	Miocene (Aquitanian)	Pentalofos Formation	Greece	A species of Homalopoma.	
Hydrobia galatoniana	Sp. nov	Valid	Esu & Girotti	Oligocene (Chattian)	Galatone Formation	Italy	A species of Hydrobia sensu lato.	
Hydrobia ionica	Sp. nov	Valid	Esu & Girotti	Oligocene (Chattian)	Galatone Formation	Italy	A species of Hydrobia sensu lato.	
Hyphantozyga? khaophrikensis	Sp. nov	Valid	Ketwetsuriya, Cook & Nützel	Permian (Wordian)	Ratburi Group	Thailand	A member of the family Pseudozygopleuridae.	
Involuta coxi	Sp. nov	Valid	Halder & Das	Eocene		India	A volute.	
Jponsia aryanamensis	Sp. nov	Valid	Pacaud			Iran		
Jponsia yesimae	Sp. nov	Valid	Pacaud	Paleogene		Turkey		
Jumaramaria	Gen. et sp. nov	Valid	Szabó & Jaitly	Middle Jurassic (Bathonian)	Jhurio Formation	India	A possible member of the family Pleurotomariidae. The type species is J. jumaraensis.	
Jurassiscala	Gen. et 2 sp. nov	Valid	Szabó et al.	Jurassic		Italy	Genus includes new species J. sturanii and possibly also J? tenuiretis.	
Keilostoma nautagarona	Sp. nov	Valid	Pacaud	Paleogene		France		
Laevitomaria babalusciae	Sp. nov	Valid	Szabó et al.	Jurassic		Italy		
Lagocheilus cretaspira	Sp. nov	Valid	Asato & Hirano in Hirano et al.	Late Cretaceous (Cenomanian)	Burmese amber	Myanmar	A species of Lagocheilus.	Lagocheilus cretaspira
Lagocheilus electrospira	Sp. nov	Valid	Asato & Hirano in Hirano et al.	Late Cretaceous (Cenomanian)	Burmese amber	Myanmar	Originally described as a species of Lagocheilus. Transferred to the genus Eotrichophorus by Balashov (2020).	Lagocheilus electrospira
Leiostyla castanheiraensis	Sp. nov	Valid	Teixeira et al.	Quaternary		Madeira	A species of Leiostyla.	
Leiostyla cooki	Sp. nov	Valid	Teixeira et al.	Quaternary		Madeira	A species of Leiostyla.	
Leiostyla desertaensis	Sp. nov	Valid	Teixeira et al.	Quaternary		Madeira	A species of Leiostyla.	
Leiostyla simulans	Sp. nov	Valid	Teixeira et al.	Quaternary		Madeira	A species of Leiostyla.	
Leptaxis groviana antiqua	Subsp. nov	Valid	Teixeira et al.	Quaternary		Madeira	A species of Leptaxis.	
Leptaxis isambertoi	Sp. nov	Valid	Teixeira et al.	Quaternary		Madeira	A species of Leptaxis.	
Levizygopleura composita	Sp. nov	Valid	Mazaev	Early Permian		Russia	A member of the family Pseudozygopleuridae.	
Levizygopleura magna	Sp. nov	Valid	Mazaev	Early Permian		Russia	A member of the family Pseudozygopleuridae.	
Littoraria (Littorinopsis) massicardi	Sp. nov	Valid	Pacaud	Paleogene		France	A species of Littoraria.	
Lophospira latilabra	Sp. nov	In press	Ebbestad et al.	Late Ordovician	Upper Ktaoua Formation	Morocco	A member of the family Lophospiridae. Announced in 2019; the final version of the article naming it is not published yet.	
Lyria peyrehoradensis	Sp. nov	Valid	Lozouet	Oligocene (Chattian)		France	A species of Lyria.	
Maestratia	Gen. et comb. nov	Valid	Dolin & Aguerre	Oligocene (Rupelian)		France	A member of the family Cypraeidae. The type species is "Pustularia (Conocypraea)" rugifera Schilder (1927).	
Masaevia	Gen. et sp. nov	Valid	Guzhov	Jurassic		Russia	A member of Heterobranchia of uncertain phylogenetic placement. Genus includes new species M. sinistra.	
Mathilda dania	Sp. nov	Valid	Hansen	Cretaceous-Paleogene boundary		Denmark	A species of Mathilda.	
Melanopsis neubaueri	Sp. nov	Valid	Pacaud	Paleogene		France	A species of Melanopsis.	
Melarhaphe perminima	Sp. nov	Valid	Pacaud	Paleogene		France	A species of Melarhaphe.	
Melarhaphe vanhyftei	Sp. nov	Valid	Pacaud	Paleogene		France	A species of Melarhaphe.	
Merica admirabilis	Sp. nov	Valid	Lozouet	Oligocene (Chattian)		France	A species of Merica.	
Merica estotiensis	Sp. nov	Valid	Lozouet	Oligocene (Chattian)		France	A species of Merica.	
Merica mutabilis	Sp. nov	Valid	Lozouet	Oligocene (Chattian)		France	A species of Merica.	
Mesalia bohnhavasae	Sp. nov	Valid	Harzhauser & Landau	Middle Miocene		Hungary	A species of Mesalia.	
Mesalia danica	Sp. nov	Valid	Hansen	Cretaceous-Paleogene boundary		Denmark	A species of Mesalia.	
Mesalia sovisi	Sp. nov	Valid	Harzhauser & Landau	Middle Miocene		Austria; Czech Republic	A species of Mesalia.	
Mesalia stryriaca	Sp. nov	Valid	Harzhauser & Landau	Middle Miocene		Austria	A species of Mesalia.	
Mitrella clava	Sp. nov	Valid	Landau, Ceulemans & Van Dingenen	Miocene (Tortonian)		France	A species of Mitrella.	
Mitrella ligeriana	Sp. nov	Valid	Landau, Ceulemans & Van Dingenen	Miocene (Tortonian)		France	A species of Mitrella.	
Mitrella miopicta	Sp. nov	Valid	Landau, Ceulemans & Van Dingenen	Miocene (Tortonian)		France	A species of Mitrella.	
Mitrella pseudoinedita	Sp. nov	Valid	Landau, Ceulemans & Van Dingenen	Miocene (Tortonian)		France	A species of Mitrella.	
Mitrella pseudoblonga	Sp. nov	Valid	Landau, Ceulemans & Van Dingenen	Miocene (Tortonian)		France	A species of Mitrella.	
Mitrella pseudoturgidula	Sp. nov	Valid	Landau, Ceulemans & Van Dingenen	Miocene (Tortonian)		France	A species of Mitrella.	
Monimirus	Gen. et sp. nov	Valid	Mazaev	Early Permian		Russia	A member of the family Stuoraxidae. Genus includes new species M. bonus.	
Monodonta joetsuensis	Sp. nov	Valid	Amano	Late Pliocene	Nadachi Formation	Japan	A species of Monodonta.	
Murexsul primigenius	Sp. nov	Valid	Merle & Pacaud	Eocene (Priabonian)		France	A species of Murexsul.	
Neverita amerrukensis	Nom. nov	Valid	Pacaud & Lebrun	Eocene (Lutetian)		Morocco	A species of Neverita.	
Nipteraxis parilis	Sp. nov	Valid	Pacaud & Lebrun	Eocene (Lutetian)		Morocco		
Novlepatella uralensis	Sp. nov	Valid	Mazaev	Early Permian		Russia	A member of the family Damilinidae.	
Ocinebrina houarti	Sp. nov	Valid	Landau et al.	Miocene (Tortonian)		France	A species of Ocinebrina.	
Olssonia	Gen. et comb. nov	Valid	Sanders, Merle & Puillandre	Eocene to early Miocene	Chira Formation; Talara Formation	Peru	A member of the family Bursidae. The type species is "Bursa" chira Olsson (1930); genus also includes Bursa chira var. yasila Olsson (1930), raised to the rank of a separate species Olssonia yasila.	
Opaliopsis carlsbergi	Sp. nov	Valid	Hansen	Cretaceous-Paleogene boundary		Denmark		
Orecopia inopinata	Sp. nov	Valid	Mazaev	Early Permian		Russia	A member of the family Omphalotrochidae.	
Orthonema conspicuum	Sp. nov	Valid	Mazaev	Early Permian		Russia	A member of the family Orthonematidae.	
Orthonema nonnullum	Sp. nov	Valid	Mazaev	Early Permian		Russia	A member of the family Orthonematidae.	
Orthonema perspicuum	Sp. nov	Valid	Mazaev	Early Permian		Russia	A member of the family Orthonematidae.	
Orthonema repandum	Sp. nov	Valid	Mazaev	Early Permian		Russia	A member of the family Orthonematidae.	
Orthonychia korotkovae	Sp. nov	Valid	Mazaev	Early Permian		Russia	A member of the family Platyceratidae.	
Palaeoloxotoma	Nom. nov	Valid	Hansen	Early-Middle Jurassic to Late Cretaceous (Maastrichtian)		Denmark; France; Jamaica; New Zealand; Poland	A member of the family Fissurellidae belonging to the subfamily Emarginulinae; a replacement name for Loxotoma Fischer (1885).	
Palaeostylus confragosus	Sp. nov	Valid	Mazaev	Early Permian		Russia	A member of the family Palaeostylidae.	
Palaeostylus nervosus	Sp. nov	Valid	Mazaev	Early Permian		Russia	A member of the family Palaeostylidae.	
Payraudeautia ermesi	Sp. nov	Valid	Pedriali, Sosso & Dell'Angelo	Miocene		Ukraine	A species of Payraudeautia.	
Payraudeautia sabrinae	Sp. nov	Valid	Pedriali, Sosso & Dell'Angelo	Miocene		Ukraine	A species of Payraudeautia.	
Payraudeautia varovtsiana	Sp. nov	Valid	Pedriali, Sosso & Dell'Angelo	Miocene		Ukraine	A species of Payraudeautia.	
Paziella gallica	Sp. nov	Valid	Landau et al.	Miocene (Tortonian)		France	A species of Paziella.	
Paziella gracilenta	Sp. nov	Valid	Landau et al.	Miocene (Tortonian)		France	A species of Paziella.	
Paziella modesta	Sp. nov	Valid	Vicián, Kovács & Stein	Late Oligocene – early Miocene		Hungary	A species of Paziella.	
Paziella parveenae	Sp. nov	Valid	Merle & Pacaud	Eocene (Ypresian)		Pakistan	A species of Paziella.	
Paziella zsoldosi	Sp. nov	Valid	Kovács & Vicián	Eocene		Hungary	A species of Paziella.	
Perakella	Gen. et 2 sp. nov	Valid	Mazaev	Permian		Malaysia; Russia	Genus includes new species P. shakhtauensis and P. batteni.	
Peruvispira uralensis	Sp. nov	Valid	Mazaev	Early Permian		Russia	A member of the family Eotomariidae.	
Phragmolites lissoni	Sp. nov	Valid	Ebbestad & Gutiérrez-Marco	Ordovician (Sandbian)	Calapuja Formation	Peru		
Pictavia lactera	Sp. nov	Valid	Gründel, Keupp & Lang	Late Jurassic (Kimmeridgian)		Germany	A member of the family Ampullinidae.	
Pisania redoniensis	Sp. nov	Valid	Landau, Ceulemans & Van Dingenen	Miocene (Tortonian)		France	A species of Pisania.	
Planiturbo lerensis	Sp. nov	Valid	Szabó & Jaitly	Middle Jurassic (Callovian)	Chari Formation	India	A member of the family Metriomphalidae.	
Platyceras sagum	Sp. nov	Valid	Mazaev	Early Permian		Russia		
Platyzona shikhanensis	Sp. nov	Valid	Mazaev	Early Permian		Russia	A member of the family Pithodeidae.	
Pleurocera gigantica	Sp. nov	Valid	Naranjo-García & Aguillón in Vega et al.	Paleocene	Las Encinas Formation	Mexico	A species of Pleurocera.	
Plocezyga boikoi	Sp. nov	Valid	Mazaev	Early Permian		Russia	A member of the family Pseudozygopleuridae.	
Plocezyga convexa	Sp. nov	Valid	Mazaev	Early Permian		Russia	A member of the family Pseudozygopleuridae.	
Plocezyga minuta	Sp. nov	Valid	Mazaev	Early Permian		Russia	A member of the family Pseudozygopleuridae.	
Plocezyga venusta	Sp. nov	Valid	Mazaev	Early Permian		Russia	A member of the family Pseudozygopleuridae.	
Polygona substrigosa	Nom. nov	Valid	Landau, Ceulemans & Van Dingenen	Miocene (Tortonian)		France	A species of Polygona; a replacement name for Fusus strigosus Millet (1865).	
Ponticypraea	Gen. et sp. nov	Valid	Fehse et al.	Late Eocene		Australia	A member of the family Cypraeidae. Genus includes new species P. egregia.	
Procerithium? inaequetuberculata	Sp. nov	Valid	Ketwetsuriya, Cook & Nützel	Permian (Wordian)	Ratburi Group	Thailand	A member of the family Procerithiidae.	
Propeucyclus	Gen. et 3 sp. nov	Valid	Szabó et al.	Jurassic		Italy	Genus includes new species P. sicanus, P. obesus and possibly also P? semireticulatus.	
Provalvata maior	Sp. nov	Valid	Cataldo et al.	Early Cretaceous (Barremian)	Huitrín Formation	Argentina		
Provalvata minor	Sp. nov	Valid	Cataldo et al.	Early Cretaceous (Barremian)	Huitrín Formation	Argentina		
Provanna pelada	Sp. nov	Valid	Kiel et al.	Early Oligocene	Talara Basin	Peru	A species of Provanna.	
Pseudocochlespira transversa	Sp. nov	Valid	Hansen	Cretaceous-Paleogene boundary		Denmark		
Pseudolivella inadspecta	Sp. nov	Valid	Pacaud & Lebrun	Eocene (Lutetian)		Morocco		
Pseudonebularia sceauxensis	Sp. nov	Valid	Landau, Ceulemans & Van Dingenen	Miocene (Tortonian)		France	A species of Pseudonebularia.	
Pseudotoma danica	Sp. nov	Valid	Hansen	Cretaceous-Paleogene boundary		Denmark		
Pseudozygopleura applicata	Sp. nov	Valid	Mazaev	Early Permian		Russia	A member of the family Pseudozygopleuridae.	
Ptychidia austrorotundata	Nom. nov	Valid	Harzhauser & Landau	Early Miocene		Austria; Slovakia	A member of the family Turritellidae; a replacement name for Turritella turris rotundata Schaffer (1912).	
Ptychidia erynella	Sp. nov	Valid	Harzhauser & Landau	Early and middle Miocene		Austria; Czech Republic; Hungary	A member of the family Turritellidae.	
Pusia brebioni	Sp. nov	Valid	Landau, Ceulemans & Van Dingenen	Miocene (Tortonian)		France	A species of Pusia.	
Pusia pseudoplicatula	Sp. nov	Valid	Landau, Ceulemans & Van Dingenen	Miocene (Tortonian)		France	A species of Pusia.	
Pusia renauleauensis	Sp. nov	Valid	Landau, Ceulemans & Van Dingenen	Miocene (Tortonian)		France	A species of Pusia.	
Pusia sublaevis	Sp. nov	Valid	Landau, Ceulemans & Van Dingenen	Miocene (Tortonian)		France	A species of Pusia.	
Pyramistomia aliakmoni	Sp. nov	Valid	Thivaiou, Harzhauser & Koskeridou	Miocene (Aquitanian)	Pentalofos Formation	Greece	A member of the family Pyramidellidae belonging to the subfamily Odostomiinae.	
Pyrazopsis mexcala	Sp. nov	Valid	Pacaud			Mexico		
Pyrgotrochus vorosi	Sp. nov	Valid	Szabó et al.	Jurassic		Italy		
Pyropelta seca	Sp. nov	Valid	Kiel et al.	Early Oligocene	Talara Basin	Peru	A species of Pyropelta.	
Radvanospira	Gen. et comb. et sp. nov	In press	Ebbestad et al.	Late Ordovician		Czech Republic; Morocco; Spain	A member of the family Platyceratidae. The type species is "Naticopsis" antiquata Barrande in Perner (1903); genus also includes new species R. baniensis. Announced in 2019; the final version of the article naming it is not published yet.	
Ramusatomaria	Gen. et sp. nov	Valid	Szabó et al.	Jurassic		Italy	Genus includes new species R. nuda.	
Retimusina	Gen. et 2 sp. nov	Valid	Szabó et al.	Jurassic		Italy	Genus includes new species R. poseidoni and possibly also R? tritoni.	
Retispira khaophrikensis	Sp. nov	Valid	Ketwetsuriya, Cook & Nützel	Permian (Wordian)	Ratburi Group	Thailand	A member of the family Bellerophontidae belonging to the subfamily Knightitinae.	
Rimella aldjazairensis	Sp. nov	Valid	Pacaud	Eocene		Algeria	A species of Rimella.	
Rissoina albaresensis	Sp. nov	Valid	Pacaud	Paleogene		France	A species of Rissoina.	
Romanekia	Gen. et comb. nov	Valid	Dolin & Aguerre	Eocene (Lutetian)		France	A member of the family Cypraeidae. The type species is "Proadusta" francki Gain, Le Renard & Belliard (2012).	
Rotfanella gerasimovi	Sp. nov	Valid	Guzhov	Jurassic		Russia	A member of the family Cimidae.	
Rotfanella reticulata	Sp. nov	Valid	Guzhov	Jurassic		Russia	A member of the family Cimidae.	
Rugosacyclus	Gen. et comb. nov	Valid	Gründel, Keupp & Lang	Late Jurassic (Kimmeridgian)		Germany	A member of Caenogastropoda of uncertain phylogenetic placement. The type species is "Spirocyclina" rugosa Brösamlen (1909).	
Saalensia	Gen. et sp. nov	Valid	Gründel, Keupp & Lang	Late Jurassic (Kimmeridgian)		Germany	A member of Sorbeoconcha belonging to the family Brachytrematidae. The type species is S. birugata.	
Sallya bimaris	Sp. nov	Valid	Mazaev	Early Permian		Russia	A member of the family Pseudophoridae.	
Sallya indigena	Sp. nov	Valid	Mazaev	Early Permian		Russia	A member of the family Pseudophoridae.	
Scelidotoma aldersoni	Sp. nov	Valid	Powell & Geiger	Miocene	Topanga Canyon Formation	United States (California)	A species of Scelidotoma.	
Schistoloma electrothauma	Sp. nov	Valid	Asato & Hirano in Hirano et al.	Late Cretaceous (Cenomanian)	Burmese amber	Myanmar	A member of the family Pupinidae. Originally described as a species of Schistoloma, subsequently recognized as an unnecessary replacement name for the genus Coptocheilus.	Coptocheilus electrothauma
Seleukella	Gen. et sp. nov	Valid	Mazaev	Early Permian		Russia	A member of the family Palaeozygopleuridae. Genus includes new species S. costata.	
Semisulcospira (Biwamelania) gamoensis	Sp. nov	Valid	Matsuoka & Miura	Early Pleistocene	Gamo Formation	Japan	A species of Semisulcospira.	
Semisulcospira (Biwamelania) nojirina	Sp. nov	Valid	Matsuoka & Miura	Late Pliocene	Ayama Formation; Koka Formation	Japan	A species of Semisulcospira.	
Semisulcospira (Biwamelania) reticulataformis	Sp. nov	Valid	Matsuoka & Miura	Late Pliocene	Ayama Formation	Japan	A species of Semisulcospira.	
Semisulcospira (Biwamelania) tagaensis	Sp. nov	Valid	Matsuoka & Miura	Early Pleistocene	Gamo Formation	Japan	A species of Semisulcospira.	
Shurovites robustus	Sp. nov	Valid	Gründel, Keupp & Lang	Late Jurassic (Kimmeridgian)		Germany	A member of Cerithioidea belonging to the family Cryptaulacidae.	
Shwedagonia korolukae	Sp. nov	Valid	Mazaev	Early Permian		Russia	A member of the family Phymatopleuridae.	
Shwedagonia pagoda	Sp. nov	Valid	Mazaev	Early Permian		Russia	A member of the family Phymatopleuridae.	
Sigmesalia ganntourensis	Sp. nov	Valid	Pacaud & Lebrun	Eocene (Lutetian)		Morocco		
Sigmesalia imitatrix	Sp. nov	Valid	Pacaud & Lebrun	Late Cretaceous (Maastrichtian)		Madagascar		
Siphonochelus tambacounda	Sp. nov	Valid	Merle & Pacaud	Eocene (Lutetian)		Senegal	A species of Siphonochelus.	
Solarioconulus kachchhensis	Sp. nov	Valid	Szabó & Jaitly	Middle Jurassic (Callovian)	Chari Formation	India	A member of the family Ataphridae.	
Spiroscala elegans	Sp. nov	Valid	Mazaev	Early Permian		Russia	A member of the family Phymatopleuridae.	
Stegocoelia abscisa	Sp. nov	Valid	Mazaev	Early Permian		Russia	A member of the family Orthonematidae.	
Stegocoelia arta	Sp. nov	Valid	Mazaev	Early Permian		Russia	A member of the family Orthonematidae.	
Stegocoelia centrosinuata	Sp. nov	Valid	Ketwetsuriya, Cook & Nützel	Permian (Wordian)	Ratburi Group	Thailand	A member of the family Goniasmatidae.	
Stenozone spiralis	Sp. nov	Valid	Mazaev	Early Permian		Russia	A member of the family Eotomariidae.	
Stephanozyga seminuda	Sp. nov	Valid	Mazaev	Early Permian		Russia	A member of the family Pseudozygopleuridae.	
Streptacis nalivkini	Sp. nov	Valid	Mazaev	Early Permian		Russia	A member of the family Streptacididae.	
Strobeus bashkiriensi	Sp. nov	Valid	Mazaev	Early Permian		Russia	A member of the family Soleniscidae.	
Strophostylus fortuitus	Sp. nov	Valid	Mazaev	Early Permian		Russia	A member of the family Platyceratidae.	
Stuoraxis crassa	Sp. nov	Valid	Guzhov	Jurassic		Russia	A member of the family Stuoraxidae.	
Sulcoactaeon? haboensis	Sp. nov	Valid	Szabó & Jaitly	Middle Jurassic (Bathonian)	Patcham Formation	India	A member of the family Aplustridae.	
Sulcomitrella sceauxensis	Sp. nov	Valid	Landau, Ceulemans & Van Dingenen	Miocene (Tortonian)		France	A species of Sulcomitrella.	
Sveltia castellum	Sp. nov	Valid	Lozouet	Oligocene (Chattian)		France	A species of Sveltia.	
Sveltia ruginosa	Sp. nov	Valid	Lozouet	Oligocene (Chattian)		France	A species of Sveltia.	
Sveltia varonei	Sp. nov	Valid	Lozouet	Oligocene (Chattian)		France	A species of Sveltia.	
Tapinotomaria cancellata	Sp. nov	Valid	Mazaev	Early Permian		Russia	A member of the family Portlockiellidae.	
Tatara pseudosassia	Sp. nov	Valid	Hansen	Cretaceous-Paleogene boundary		Denmark		
Tectonatica anistratenkorum	Sp. nov	Valid	Pedriali, Sosso & Dell'Angelo	Miocene		Ukraine	A species of Tectonatica.	
Tectonatica pseudoprietoi	Sp. nov	Valid	Pedriali, Sosso & Dell'Angelo	Miocene		Ukraine	A species of Tectonatica.	
Tectus extraconicus	Sp. nov	Valid	Gain, Belliard & Le Renard	Eocene		France	A species of Tectus.	
Tectus fluctus	Sp. nov	Valid	Gain, Belliard & Le Renard	Eocene		France	A species of Tectus.	
Tectus fredevillensis	Sp. nov	Valid	Gain, Belliard & Le Renard	Eocene		France	A species of Tectus.	
Tectus gervillii	Sp. nov	Valid	Gain, Belliard & Le Renard	Eocene		France	A species of Tectus.	
Tectus? indecorus	Sp. nov	Valid	Hansen	Cretaceous-Paleogene boundary		Denmark	Possibly a species of Tectus.	
Tectus leae	Sp. nov	Valid	Gain, Belliard & Le Renard	Eocene		France	A species of Tectus.	
Tectus planibasis	Sp. nov	Valid	Gain, Belliard & Le Renard	Eocene		France	A species of Tectus.	
Tectus richardi	Sp. nov	Valid	Gain, Belliard & Le Renard	Eocene		France	A species of Tectus.	
Tectus spinalis	Sp. nov	Valid	Gain, Belliard & Le Renard	Eocene		France	A species of Tectus.	
Tectus torticostulus	Sp. nov	Valid	Gain, Belliard & Le Renard	Eocene		France	A species of Tectus.	
Temnotropis stevniensis	Sp. nov	Valid	Hansen	Cretaceous-Paleogene boundary		Denmark		
Termihabena	Gen. et sp. et comb. nov	Valid	Mazaev	Early Permian		Russia	Genus includes new species T. lirata, as well as Т. nikitowkensis (Yakowlew, 1899), T. asiatica (Licharew, 1967), T. millegranosa (Girty, 1934) and T. pinegensis (Mazaev, 2006).	
Thereitis carlsbergi	Sp. nov	Valid	Hansen	Cretaceous-Paleogene boundary		Denmark		
Thereitis cretacea	Sp. nov	Valid	Hansen	Cretaceous-Paleogene boundary		Denmark		
Thylacodes contendis	Sp. nov	Valid	Hansen	Cretaceous-Paleogene boundary		Denmark	A species of Thylacodes.	
Toronyella	Gen. et 2 sp. nov	Valid	Szabó et al.	Jurassic		Italy	Genus includes new species T. lineata and T. margaritata.	
Torquesia (Ispharina) atax	Nom. nov	Valid	Pacaud	Paleogene		France		
Trachydomia shkurkoi	Sp. nov	Valid	Mazaev	Early Permian		Russia	A member of the family Trachyspiridae.	
Trapanimaria	Gen. et 3 sp. nov et comb. nov	Valid	Szabó et al.	Jurassic		Italy	Genus includes new species T. gattoi, T. nicolosiensis and possibly also T? pallinii, genus also includes Pleurotomaria alba Queenstedt (1857), Pleurotomaria eudora d'Orbigny, (1860) and possibly Pleurotomaria neosolodurina Dacque (1905)	
Tritia albrechti	Sp. nov	Valid	Stein	Miocene		North Sea basin	A species of Tritia.	
Tritia girondica kautskyi	Subsp. nov	Valid	Stein	Miocene		North Sea basin		
Tritia hemmoorica	Sp. nov	Valid	Stein	Miocene		North Sea basin	A species of Tritia.	
Tritia jyllandica	Sp. nov	Valid	Stein	Miocene		North Sea basin	A species of Tritia.	
Tritia karinwienrichae	Nom. nov	Valid	Stein	Miocene		Germany	A species of Tritia; a replacement name for Nassarius karinae Wienrich (2001).	
Tritia kostejana krocki	Subsp. nov	Valid	Stein	Miocene		North Sea basin		
Tritia mostafavii	Nom. nov	Valid	Stein	Miocene		Germany	A species of Tritia; a replacement name for Hinia coronata Mostafavi (1978).	
Tritia mothsi	Sp. nov	Valid	Stein	Miocene		North Sea basin	A species of Tritia.	
Tritia sorgenfreii	Sp. nov	Valid	Stein	Miocene		North Sea basin	A species of Tritia.	
Tritia turtaudierei	Sp. nov	Valid	Landau, Ceulemans & Van Dingenen	Miocene (Tortonian)		France	A species of Tritia.	
Tritia westfalica	Sp. nov	Valid	Stein	Miocene		North Sea basin	A species of Tritia.	
Tritonophon grandis	Sp. nov	In press	Ebbestad et al.	Late Ordovician	Lower Second Bani Formation	Morocco	A member of the family Bellerophontidae. Announced in 2019; the final version of the article naming it is not published yet.	
Trochotomaria conoidea	Sp. nov	Valid	Szabó et al.	Jurassic		Italy		
Trochotomaria polymorpha	Sp. nov	Valid	Szabó et al.	Jurassic		Italy		
Tropacerithium	Gen. et 2 sp. nov	Valid	Gründel, Keupp & Lang	Late Jurassic (Kimmeridgian)		Germany	A member of Cerithioidea possibly belonging to the family Cryptaulacidae. The type species is T. cumaritum; genus also includes T. danubii.	
Tychonia fortis	Sp. nov	Valid	Mazaev	Early Permian		Russia	A member of the family Anomphalidae.	
Typhina cryptica	Sp. nov	Valid	Merle & Pacaud	Eocene (Ypresian)		France	A species of Typhina.	
Typhina radulfiensis	Sp. nov	Valid	Merle & Pacaud	Eocene (Priabonian)		France	A species of Typhina.	
Unitas aequalis	Sp. nov	Valid	Lozouet	Oligocene (Chattian)		France	A member of the family Cancellariidae.	
Unitas aquitanica	Sp. nov	Valid	Lozouet	Oligocene (Chattian)		France	A member of the family Cancellariidae.	
Unitas arenosa	Sp. nov	Valid	Lozouet	Oligocene (Chattian)		France	A member of the family Cancellariidae.	
Unitas decorticata	Sp. nov	Valid	Lozouet	Oligocene (Chattian)		France	A member of the family Cancellariidae.	
Unitas gradata	Sp. nov	Valid	Lozouet	Oligocene (Chattian)		France	A member of the family Cancellariidae.	
Unitas heinbergi	Sp. nov	Valid	Hansen	Cretaceous-Paleogene boundary		Denmark		
Unitas sanctistephani	Sp. nov	Valid	Lozouet	Oligocene (Chattian)		France	A member of the family Cancellariidae.	
Unitas substephanensis	Sp. nov	Valid	Lozouet	Oligocene (Chattian)		France	A member of the family Cancellariidae.	
Urlocella undulata	Sp. nov	Valid	Guzhov	Jurassic		Russia	A member of the family Cimidae.	
Unzhispira	Gen. et sp. nov	Valid	Guzhov	Jurassic		Russia	A member of the family Cimidae. Genus includes new species U. minuta.	
Vatopsis heinbergi	Sp. nov	Valid	Hansen	Cretaceous-Paleogene boundary		Denmark		
Vermeijia	Gen. et sp. nov	Valid	Amano	Late Pliocene	Kuwae Formation	Japan	A member of the family Capulidae. Genus includes new species V. japonica.	
Vernelia samae	Sp. nov	Valid	Foster et al.	Early Triassic		China		
Vexillum? rosenkrantzi	Sp. nov	Valid	Hansen	Cretaceous-Paleogene boundary		Denmark	Possibly a species of Vexillum.	
Vexillum tenestolidum	Sp. nov	Valid	Hansen	Cretaceous-Paleogene boundary		Denmark	A species of Vexillum.	
Vicinocerithium vynckei	Nom. nov	Valid	Pacaud	Paleogene		France		
Vicnigoria	Gen. et sp. nov	Valid	Mazaev	Early Permian		Russia	Probably a member of the family Trochonematidae. Genus includes new species V. monstrata.	
Viennella	Gen. et comb. et sp. nov	Valid	Harzhauser & Landau	Middle Miocene		Austria; Hungary	A member of the family Turritellidae. The type species is "Turritella" incisaeformis Csepreghy-Meznerics (1956); genus also includes new species V. ignorata.	
Viviparus riegensis	Nom. nov	Valid	Pacaud	Paleogene		France	A species of Viviparus.	
Volvarina sibuzatiana	Sp. nov	Valid	Lozouet	Oligocene (Chattian)		France	A species of Volvarina.	
Wateletia custodia	Nom. nov	Valid	Pacaud	Paleogene		France		
Worthenia? waterhouse	Sp. nov	Valid	Ketwetsuriya, Cook & Nützel	Permian (Wordian)	Ratburi Group	Thailand	A member of the family Lophospiridae.	
Zarnglaffia palermitana	Sp. nov	Valid	Szabó et al.	Jurassic		Italy		
Zarnglaffia polygonalis	Sp. nov	Valid	Szabó et al.	Jurassic		Italy		
Zebinella selandica	Sp. nov	Valid	Hansen	Cretaceous-Paleogene boundary		Denmark	A species of Zebinella.	
Zizipupa	Gen. et sp. nov	Valid	Guzhov	Jurassic		Russia	A member of the family Ampezzanildidae. Genus includes new species Z. costata.	

== Other molluscs ==
=== Research ===
- A study on shell microstructures of specimens of Anabarella australis from the Cambrian Series 2 Xinji Formation of the North China Block is published by Li et al. (2019).
- A study on the relative importance of bivalves and brachiopods in the fossil assemblages from the Carboniferous Pennsylvanian Breathitt Formation of Kentucky is published by Hsieh, Bush & Bennington (2019).
- A study on transitional Permian-Triassic bivalve fauna from five sections of littoral clastic facies in southwestern China is published by Song et al. (2019).
- A study on body size changes in bivalves in the aftermath of the Permian–Triassic extinction event is published online by Atkinson & Wignall (2019).
- A study on changes of body size of bivalves belonging to the family Limidae prior to, and in the aftermath of the Triassic–Jurassic extinction event is published by Atkinson et al. (2019).
- A study on changes in the body size of benthic marine bivalves and brachiopods from the Lusitanian Basin (Portugal) before the Toarcian oceanic anoxic event is published by Piazza et al. (2019).
- A study on the impact of the early Toarcian extinction event on fossil brachiopods and bivalves known from the Iberian Range (Spain) is published by Danise et al. (2019).
- A study on the impact of the Early Toarcian Oceanic Anoxic Event on the population of the bivalve species Posidonotis cancellata from the Neuquén Basin (Argentina) is published by Franch et al. (2019).
- A study on the temporal and spatial distribution of pectinid and ostreid bivalves in Middle and Late Jurassic sequences exposed in the Tanggula Mountains (China) is published by Sha (2019).
- A study on muscle attachment sites preserved in phosphatized inoceramid Gnesioceramus anglicus, and on their implications for inferring the palaeobiology of inoceramid bivalves, is published by Knight & Morris (2019).
- A sclerochronological study of shells of the gigantic inoceramids Sphenoceramus schmidti and S. sachalinensis from the middle Campanian Yezo Basin in Hokkaido (Japan) is published by Walliser et al. (2019).
- A study on the relationship of growth rate in the scallop Carolinapecten eboreus to temperature and primary production, and on its implications for inferring the cause of extinction of this species, is published by Johnson et al. (2019).

=== New taxa ===
Name	Novelty	Status	Authors	Age	Type locality	Country	Notes	Images
Acharax svalbardensis	Sp. nov	Valid	Hansen et al.	Late Pleistocene		Fram Strait	A bivalve belonging to the family Solemyidae.	
Atomodesma? hautmanni	Sp. nov	Valid	Foster et al.	Early Triassic		China	A bivalve.	
Atrina multicostata	Sp. nov	Valid	Friesenbichler et al.	Middle Triassic (Anisian)	Caerace Formation	Romania	A bivalve, a species of Atrina.	
Baxoitrigonia	Gen. et sp. nov		Stiller & Chen	Late Jurassic (Tithonian)	Lagongtang Formation	China	A bivalve. Genus includes new species B. baxoiensis.	
Bengtsonella	Gen. et comb. nov	Junior homonym	Cooper & Leanza	Early Cretaceous (Albian)	Riachuelo Formation	Brazil	A bivalve belonging to the family Megatrigoniidae and the subfamily Megatrigoniinae. The type species is "Anditrigonia" britoi Hessel (2005). The generic name is preoccupied by Bengtsonella Muller & Hinz (1991) and Bengtsonella Mostler (1996); Ceccolini & Cianferoni (2021) coined a replacement name Bengtsonigonia.	
Californigonia	Gen. et comb. nov	Valid	Cooper & Leanza	Jurassic (Callovian–early Oxfordian)	Bicknell Sandstone	Canada (British Columbia); United States (California)	A bivalve belonging to the subfamily Megatrigoniinae. The type species is "Trigonia" plumasensis Hyatt (1892).	
Callocardia (Nitidavenus) youssoufia	Sp. nov	Valid	Pacaud & Lebrun	Eocene (Lutetian)		Morocco	A bivalve.	
Callucina itaporangensis	Sp. nov	Valid	Ayoub-Hannaa et al.	Cretaceous	Cotinguiba Formation	Brazil; United Kingdom	A bivalve belonging to the family Lucinidae.	
Cardiocardita peregrina	Sp. nov	Valid	Pacaud & Lebrun	Eocene (Lutetian)		Morocco	A bivalve.	
Carditella pitufina	Sp. nov	Valid	Pérez	Early Pliocene		Argentina	A bivalve belonging to the family Condylocardiidae.	
Chlamys (Praechlamys) prima	Sp. nov	Valid	Friesenbichler et al.	Middle Triassic (Anisian)	Caerace Formation	Romania	A bivalve, a species of Chlamys.	
Ckaraosippur	Gen. et comb. et sp. nov	Valid	Santelli & del Río	Miocene–Pliocene	Bahía Inglesa Formation; Camarones Formation; Navidad Formation	Argentina; Chile	A scallop. The type specie is "Pecten" calderensis Möricke (1896); genus also includes new species C. camachoi.	
Conchocele yatsuoensis	Sp. nov	Valid	Amano et al.	Early Miocene	Kurosedani Formation	Japan	A bivalve.	
Costacallista discrepans	Sp. nov	Valid	Pacaud & Lebrun	Eocene (Lutetian)		Morocco	A bivalve.	
Craginella	Gen. et comb. nov	Valid	Cooper & Leanza	Late Jurassic (Kimmeridgian)	Malone Formation	Mexico; United States (Louisiana; Texas)	A bivalve belonging to the subfamily Megatrigoniinae. The type species is "Trigonia" goodellii Cragin (1897).	
Damborenella	Gen. et comb. nov	Valid	Cooper & Leanza	Late Jurassic (Tithonian)		Argentina; Chile; Colombia; Peru	A bivalve belonging to the subfamily Megatrigoniinae. The type species is "Trigonia" eximia Philippi (1899); genus also includes "Trigonia" discors Philippi (1899), "Anditrigonia" lamberti Levy (1967) and "Anditrigonia eximia" tesselicaudata Leanza (1993) (raised to the rank of a separate species Damborenella tessellicaudata).	
Dentalium mcganna	Sp. nov	Valid	Powell, Clites & Poust	Miocene	Sobrante Formation	United States (California)	A species of Dentalium.	
Dietotenhosen	Gen. et comb. nov	Valid	Santelli & del Río	Miocene–Pliocene	Bahía Inglesa Formation; Coquimbo Formation; Horcón Formation; Hornillos Formation; Huaricangana Formation; La Portada Formation; Pisco Formation; Taime Formation	Chile; Peru	A scallop. Genus includes D. hupeanus (Philippi, 1887) and D. remondi (Philippi, 1887).	
Dosinia (Dosinisca) vredenburgi	Sp. nov	Valid	Borkar & Kulkarni	Miocene	Chhasra Formation; Khari Nadi Formation; Lower Mekran Series	India; Pakistan	A bivalve belonging to the family Veneridae; a species of Dosinia.	
Dosinia (Dosinisca) wynnei	Sp. nov	Valid	Borkar & Kulkarni	Miocene	Chhasra Formation; Khari Nadi Formation; Lower Mekran Series	India; Pakistan	A bivalve belonging to the family Veneridae; a species of Dosinia.	
Entolium reticulatum	Sp. nov	Valid	Friesenbichler et al.	Middle Triassic (Anisian)	Caerace Formation	Romania	A bivalve.	
Eosphaera	Gen. et comb. nov	Valid	Fürsich, Heinze & Ayoub-Hannaa	Jurassic (Callovian to Kimmeridgian)		Egypt; India; Madagascar; Portugal	A bivalve belonging to the family Lucinidae. The type species is "Sphaera" madagascariensis Newton (1889).	
Chaetopleura abbessi	Sp. nov	Valid	Cherns & Schwabe	Oligocene (Chattian) and Miocene (Burdigalian)		France	A chiton. Originally described as a species of Chaetopleura; subsequently transferred to the genus Ischnochiton by Dell'Angelo et al. (2018).	
Chaetopleura gaasi	Sp. nov	Valid	Cherns & Schwabe	Oligocene (Rupelian)		France	A chiton, Originally described as a species of Chaetopleura; subsequently transferred to the new genus Spinochiton by Dell'Angelo et al. (2018).	
Helcionella lemdadensis	Sp. nov	Valid	Geyer, Valent & Meier	Cambrian	Tannenknock Formation	Germany		
Hoernesia? danisa	Sp. nov	Valid	Foster et al.	Early Triassic		China	A bivalve.	
Homopleura	Gen. et comb. et 2 sp. nov	Valid	Masse & Fenerci-Masse	Cretaceous		Bulgaria; France	A rudist bivalve. The type species is "Monopleura" affinis Matheron (1878); genus also includes "Monopleura" imbricata Matheron (1842) and "Monopleura" coquandi Matheron (1878), as well as new species H. rustrella and H. balkanica.	
Inoceramus chiplonkari	Sp. nov	Valid	Walaszczyk in Gale, Kennedy & Walaszczyk	Late Cretaceous (Cenomanian and Turonian)	Karai Formation	India; Japan		
Ischnochiton crovatoi	Sp. nov	Valid	Dell'Angelo, Sosso & Bonfitto	Pleistocene		Italy	A chiton, a species of Ischnochiton.	
Ischnochiton fehsei	Sp. nov	Valid	Cherns & Schwabe	Eocene		France	A chiton, a species of Ischnochiton.	
Lasaea firma	Sp. nov	Valid	Lesport & Lozouet in Lesport et al.	Miocene (Aquitanian)		France	A bivalve belonging to the family Lasaeidae.	
Leptostega frankenwaldensis	Sp. nov	Valid	Geyer, Valent & Meier	Cambrian	Tannenknock Formation	Germany	A helcionelloid.	
Neilo altamirano	Sp. nov	Valid	Kiel et al.	Early Oligocene	Talara Basin	Peru	A bivalve belonging to the family Malletiidae.	
Neocrassina (Pruvostiella) madagascariensis	Sp. nov	Valid	Fürsich, Heinze & Ayoub-Hannaa	Late Jurassic (Oxfordian)	Morondava Basin	Madagascar	A bivalve belonging to the family Astartidae.	
Palaeonucula feruglioi	Sp. nov	Valid	Damborenea & Pagani	Early Jurassic		Argentina	A bivalve.	
Parailsanella luonanensis	Sp. nov	Valid	Li et al.	Cambrian Series 2	Xinji Formation	China	A helcionellid.	
Peronaea basteroti	Sp. nov	Valid	Lesport, Lozouet & Pacaud in Lesport et al.	Miocene (Aquitanian)		France	A bivalve, a species of Peronaea.	
Phaenodesmia? piatnitzkyi	Sp. nov	Valid	Damborenea & Pagani	Early Jurassic		Argentina	A bivalve.	
Pinna simionescui	Sp. nov	Valid	Friesenbichler et al.	Middle Triassic (Anisian)	Caerace Formation	Romania	A bivalve, a species of Pinna.	
Platymyoidea morrisi	Sp. nov	Valid	Hodges	Early Jurassic		United Kingdom	A bivalve.	
Pleurophopsis matsumotoi	Sp. nov	Valid	Amano et al.	Late Oligocene to early Miocene	Nabae Group	Japan	A bivalve belonging to the family Vesicomyidae.	
Pleurophopsis talarensis	Sp. nov	Valid	Kiel et al.	Early Oligocene	Talara Basin	Peru	A bivalve belonging to the family Vesicomyidae.	
Praedicerocardium	Gen. et sp. nov	Valid	Friesenbichler et al.	Middle Triassic (Anisian)	Caerace Formation	Romania	A bivalve. Genus includes new species P. vetulus.	
Praenucula pojetai	Sp. nov	In press	Ebbestad et al.	Late Ordovician		Morocco	A bivalve belonging to the family Praenuculidae. Announced in 2019; the final version of the article naming it is not published yet.	
Procardia inouei	Sp. nov	Valid	Amano	Paleocene	Katsuhira Formation	Japan	A bivalve belonging to the group Anomalodesmata and to the family Parilimyidae.	
Pseudophopsis	Gen. et comb. nov	Valid	Kiel et al.	Eocene and Early Oligocene	Talara Basin	Cuba; Peru	A bivalve belonging to the group Heterodonta and to the family Kalenteridae. The type species is "Pleurophopsis" peruviana Olsson (1931); genus also includes "Unio" bitumen Cooke (1919).	
Quenstedtia madagascariensis	Sp. nov	Valid	Fürsich, Heinze & Ayoub-Hannaa	Late Jurassic (Oxfordian)	Morondava Basin	Madagascar	A bivalve belonging to the family Quenstedtiidae.	
Ramentoides xixiangensis	Sp. nov	Valid	Qin et al.	Cambrian		China	A member of Maikhanellidae.	
Romaniamya	Gen. et sp. nov	Valid	Friesenbichler et al.	Middle Triassic (Anisian)	Caerace Formation	Romania	A bivalve. Genus includes new species R. mahmudiaensis.	
Rutitrigonia cintarojensis	Sp. nov	Valid	Cataldo et al.	Early Cretaceous (Barremian)	Huitrín Formation	Argentina	A bivalve.	
Ryderia tehuelchana	Sp. nov	Valid	Damborenea & Pagani	Early Jurassic		Argentina	A bivalve.	
Scythentolium anisicum	Sp. nov	Valid	Friesenbichler et al.	Middle Triassic (Anisian)	Caerace Formation	Romania	A bivalve.	
Sogdianagonia	Nom. nov	Valid	Schneider & Kelly	Late Cretaceous (Cenomanian to Turonian)		Kyrgyzstan; Uzbekistan	A bivalve belonging to the family Megatrigoniidae; a replacement name for Turkestanella Tashiro (1979). The type species is "Trigonia" turkestanensis Arkhangelsky (1916).	
Solemya lucifuga	Sp. nov	Valid	Pérez-Barría & Nielsen	Early Miocene	Ranquil Formation	Chile	A bivalve, a species of Solemya.	
Stenoplax monila	Sp. nov	Disputed	Cherns & Schwabe	Oligocene (Rupelian)		France	A chiton. Originally described as a species of Stenoplax; Dell'Angelo et al. (2020) considered this species to be a junior synonym of Lepidochitona oligocaena.	
Tindaria kretensis	Sp. nov	Valid	Koskeridou, La Perna & Giamali	Early Pliocene		Greece	A bivalve.	
Tonicella lira	Sp. nov	Valid	Cherns & Schwabe	Oligocene (Chattian)		France	A chiton, a species of Tonicella.	
Vaccinites alceotarlaoi	Sp. nov	Valid	Pons et al.	Late Cretaceous (early Campanian)		Serbia; Spain	A rudist bivalve.	
Vaccinites bilottei	Sp. nov	Valid	Pons et al.	Late Cretaceous (late Campanian)		Bulgaria	A rudist bivalve.	
Vaccinites pirenaicus	Sp. nov	Valid	Pons et al.	Late Cretaceous (late Campanian)		Spain	A rudist bivalve.	
Wareniconcha mercenarioides	Sp. nov	Valid	Kase et al.	Pliocene		Philippines	A bivalve belonging to the family Vesicomyidae.	
Xylophagella littlei	Sp. nov	Valid	Hryniewicz in Hryniewicz et al.	Late Paleocene	Basilika Formation	Norway	A bivalve belonging to the family Pholadidae.	
Yoldiella spitsbergensis	Sp. nov	Valid	Amano in Hryniewicz et al.	Late Paleocene	Basilika Formation	Norway	A bivalve belonging to the family Yoldiidae.	
