= Brocchus =

Brocchus may refer to:

- Brocchus, from List of Roman cognomina
- Perry E. Brocchus (1810–1880), justice of the Supreme Court of the Utah Territory
- Lagocheilus brocchus, a gastropod in genus Lagocheilus
