= Tofangoceras =

Tofangoceras Temporal range: middle Ordovician

Scientific classification
- Kingdom: Animalia
- Phylum: Mollusca
- Class: Cephalopoda
- Order: †Orthocerida
- Family: †Stereoplasmoceratidae
- Genus: †Tofangoceras; Kobayashi, 1927

Genus of molluscs

Tofangoceras is a genus of pseudorthoceroid cephalopods from the Middle Ordovician of the USA (NY) and Asia (S. Manchuria, Korea, and Siberia) belonging to the Stereoplasmoceratidae and similar to Stereoplansmoceras.

The shell of Tofangoceras is long, straight, and faintly annulated, less strongly than for Stereoplasmoceras. The siphuncle is central with moderately expanded, spindle-like segments. Aperture unknown.
