= Gemmulopsis nigellensis =

Scientific classification
- Kingdom: Animalia
- Phylum: Mollusca
- Class: Gastropoda
- Subclass: Caenogastropoda
- Order: Neogastropoda
- Superfamily: Conoidea
- Family: Turridae
- Genus: †Gemmulopsis
- Species: †G. nigellensis

Binomial name
- †Gemmulopsis nigellensis Tracey & Craig, 2019

Species of gastropod

Gemmulopsis nigellensis is an extinct species of sea snails, marine gastropod mollusks in the family Turridae.

== Distribution ==
Fossils of this extinct species were found in late Lutetian Eocene strata of the Cotentin, northwest France.
