= Eopleurotoma =

Scientific classification
- Kingdom: Animalia
- Phylum: Mollusca
- Class: Gastropoda
- Subclass: Caenogastropoda
- Order: Neogastropoda
- Superfamily: Conoidea
- Family: incertae sedis
- Genus: †Eopleurotoma; Cossmann, 1889

Synonyms
- † Pleurotoma (Eopleurotoma) Cossmann, 1889

Extinct genus of gastropods

Eopleurotoma is an extinct genus of sea snails, marine gastropod mollusks currently unassigned to a family in the superfamily Conoidea, the turrids.

== Species ==
Species within the genus Eopleurotoma include:

- † Eopleurotoma bella Tracey & Craig, 2019
- † Eopleurotoma bicincta Tracey & Craig, 2019
- † Eopleurotoma boxleyi Tracey & Craig, 2019
- † Eopleurotoma christinae Tracey & Craig, 2019
- † Eopleurotoma distanticosta (Cossmann & Pissarro, 1900)
- † Eopleurotoma fluctuosa (Deshayes, 1865)
- † Eopleurotoma fresvillensis (Cossmann & Pissarro, 1900)
- † Eopleurotoma hastula Tracey & Craig, 2019
- † Eopleurotoma longicauda Brébion, 1992
- † Eopleurotoma morelleti J. K. Tucker & Le Renard, 1993†
- † Eopleurotoma multinoda (Lamarck, 1804)
- † Eopleurotoma palmeri Le Renard, 1994
- † Eopleurotoma procera (Cossmann & Pissarro, 1900)
- † Eopleurotoma scitula Tracey & Craig, 2019
- † Eopleurotoma spreta (Deshayes, 1865)
- † Eopleurotoma undata (Lamarck, 1804)
- † Eopleurotoma vauvillensis Tracey & Craig, 2019
