= Paraturbinidae =

Scientific classification
- Kingdom: Animalia
- Phylum: Mollusca
- Class: Gastropoda
- Subclass: incertae sedis
- Family: †Paraturbinidae; Cossmann, 1916

Genera
- †Chartronella Cossmann, 1902; †Creniturbo Cossmann, 1918; †Paraturbo Cossmann, 1907

Extinct family of gastropods

Paraturbinidae is an extinct family of snails from the Mesozoic period, gastropod molluscs.

Knight, J. B. et al. Treatise on Invertebrate Paleontology, vol I. 1960. Paleozoic is an incorrect inference from Bouchet and Rocroi.

This family is unassigned to superfamily. This family has no subfamilies.
