= Eopleurotoma bella =

Scientific classification
- Kingdom: Animalia
- Phylum: Mollusca
- Class: Gastropoda
- Subclass: Caenogastropoda
- Order: Neogastropoda
- Family: incertae sedis
- Genus: †Eopleurotoma
- Species: †E. bella

Binomial name
- †Eopleurotoma bella Tracey & Craig, 2019

Extinct species of gastropod

Eopleurotoma bella is an extinct marine gastropod mollusk of the genus Eopleurotoma discovered as a fossil in France in 2019. It is dated to the late Lutetian Eocene of the Cotentin Peninsula. Not much is known about the species, as its fossil was only recently unearthed.
