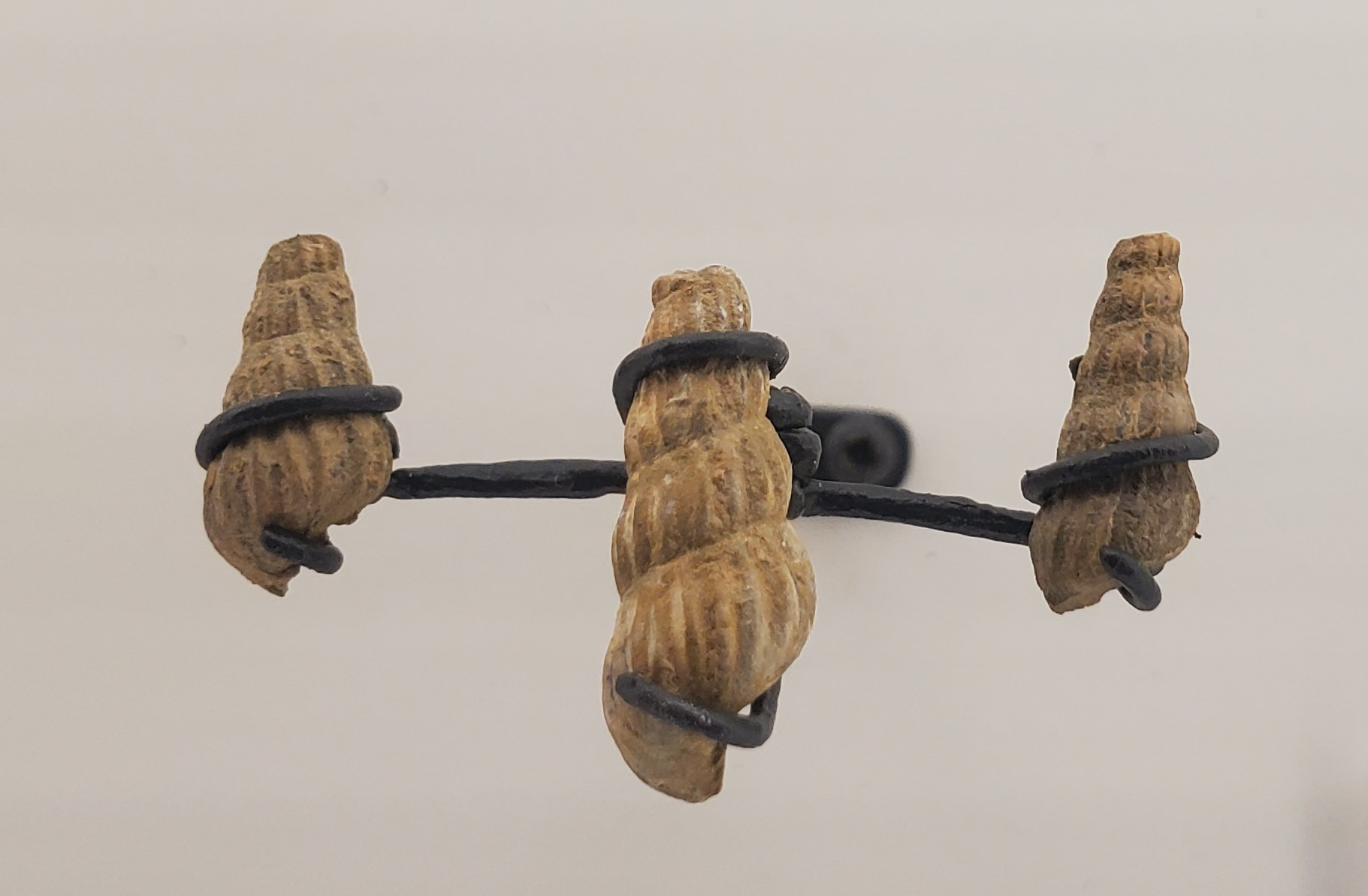
- Pseudozygopleura sp.

Scientific classification
- Kingdom: Animalia
- Phylum: Mollusca
- Class: Gastropoda
- Subclass: Caenogastropoda
- Superfamily: †Pseudozygopleuroidea
- Family: †Pseudozygopleuridae; Knight, 1930

= Pseudozygopleuridae =

Extinct family of gastropods

Pseudozygopleuridae is an extinct family of fossil sea snails, marine gastropod molluscs in the clade Caenogastropoda.
