= Alvania amphitrite =

Scientific classification
- Kingdom: Animalia
- Phylum: Mollusca
- Class: Gastropoda
- Subclass: Caenogastropoda
- Order: Littorinimorpha
- Superfamily: Rissooidea
- Family: Rissoidae
- Genus: Alvania
- Species: †A. amphitrite

Binomial name
- †Alvania amphitrite Thivaiou, Harzhauser & Koskeridou, 2019

Species of gastropod

Alvania amphitrite is an extinct species of minute sea snail, a marine gastropod mollusc or micromollusk in the family Rissoidae.

== Distribution ==
Fossils of this marine species were found in Early Miocene strata in northwest Greece.
