= Epalxis =

Scientific classification
- Kingdom: Animalia
- Phylum: Mollusca
- Class: Gastropoda
- Subclass: Caenogastropoda
- Order: Neogastropoda
- Superfamily: Conoidea
- Family: Turridae
- Genus: †Epalxis; Cossmann, 1889

Type species
- † Pleurotoma ventricosa Lamarck, 1804

Synonyms
- † Dolichotoma (Epalxis) Cossmann, 1889 (original rank)

Extinct genus of gastropods

Epalxis is an extinct genus of sea snails, marine gastropod mollusks in the family Turridae, the turrids.

== Type species ==
Cossmann stated the type species of Epalxis to be Pleurotoma crenulata Lamarck, 1804; however he used the latter name in the sense of Deshayes (1834). P. crenulata in the sense of Deshayes and Cossmann is in fact Pleurotoma ventricosa Lamarck, 1804. Brebion [1992, Cossmanniana, Hors-série 1] accepted P. ventricosa as the type species of Epalxis, and Tracey et al. (2019) accepted Brebion's type species fixation under Art. 70.3 and 86.1.1 of the Code. However, Art. 70.3 cannot be applied retroactively to Brebion's type species fixation. Tracey et al. should have invoked Art. 70.3 in their own right if they chose to do so. For the time being, this leaves Pleurotoma crenulata Lamarck, 1804, as the type species of Epalxis by OD.

== Species ==
Species within the genus Epalxis include:

- † Epalxis bouryi Tucker & Renard, 1993
- † Epalxis crenata (J.G. Bruguière, 179 )
- † Epalxis edwardsi H.I. Tucker & J. Le Renard
- † Epalxis lima (F.E. Edwards, 1861)
- † Epalxis multigyrata (G.P. Deshayes, 1865)
- † Epalxis reticulosa F.E. Edwards
- † Epalxis symondsi Tracey & Craig, 2019
- † Epalxis toddi Tracey & Craig, 2019
- † Epalxis ventricosa (Lamarck, 1804)

Species brought into synonymy

- † Epalxis rosenkrantzi Hansen, 2019: synonym of † Fusulculus hanseni Pacaud, 2020 (invalid: secondary junior homonym of Fusulculus rosenkrantzi (Traub, 1979))
