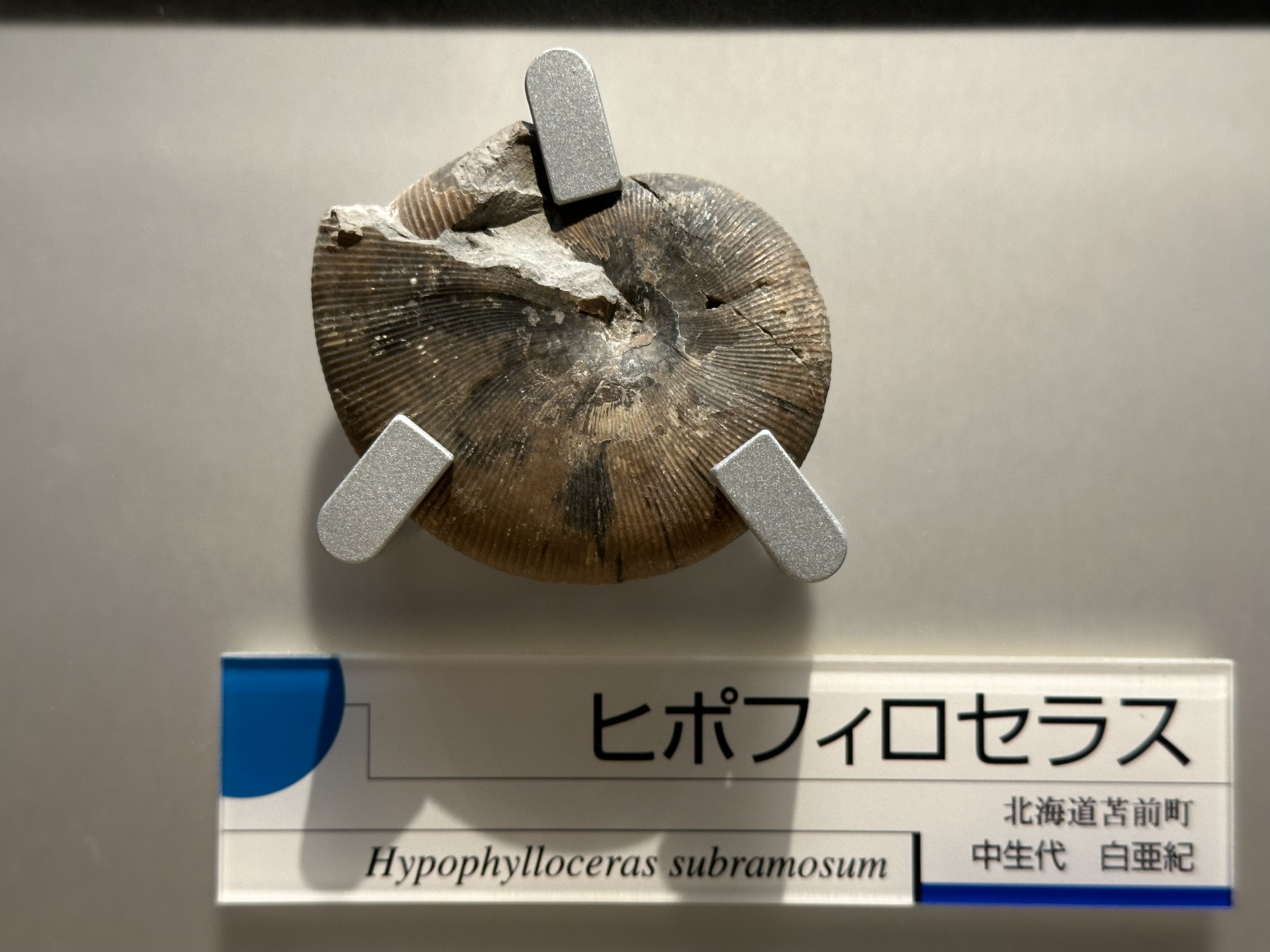
- Hypophylloceras at the Toyohashi City Natural History Museum

Scientific classification
- Kingdom: Animalia
- Phylum: Mollusca
- Class: Cephalopoda
- Subclass: †Ammonoidea
- Genus: †Neophylloceras

Species
- H. (Neophylloceras) ramosus; H. hetonaiense; H. nera; H. ultinatum

= Neophylloceras =

Neophylloceras Temporal range: Maastrichtian

Extinct genus of molluscs

Neophylloceras is an extinct genus of cephalopod belonging to the Ammonite subclass.
