= Kullsberg Limestone =

Geologic formation in Norway and Sweden

- Stratigraphic range: Ordovician
- Type: Formation

Lithology
- Primary: Limestone

Location
- Country: Norway, Sweden

The Kullsberg Limestone is a geologic formation in Norway and Sweden. It preserves fossils dating back to the Ordovician period.

== See also ==
- List of fossiliferous stratigraphic units in Norway
- List of fossiliferous stratigraphic units in Sweden
