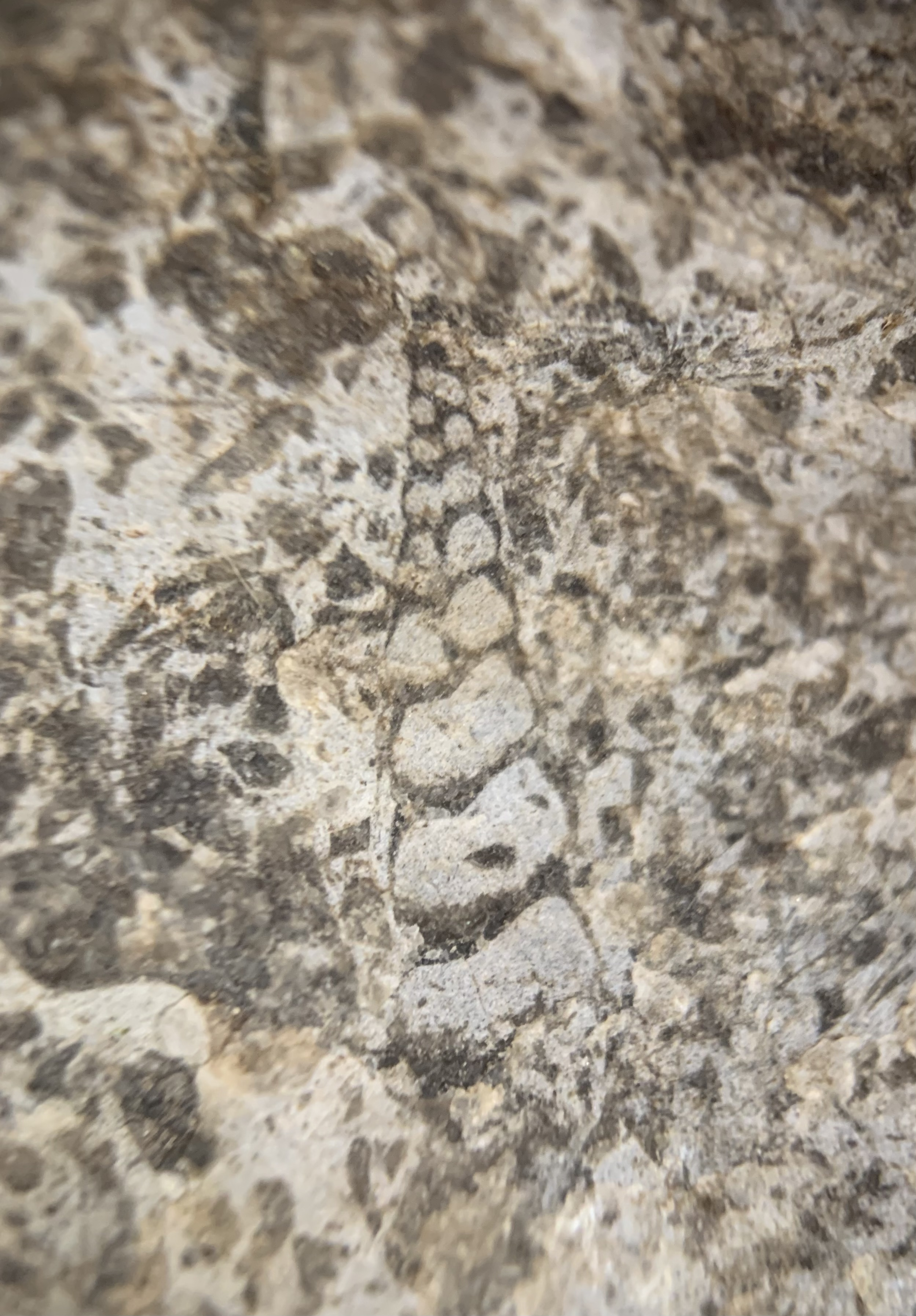
- A Donaldina sp. cross section from the Moscovian of Pennsylvania

Scientific classification
- Kingdom: Animalia
- Phylum: Mollusca
- Class: Gastropoda
- Family: †Donaldinidae
- Genus: †Donaldina; Knight, 1933

= Donaldina (gastropod) =

Donaldina Temporal range: Carboniferous

Extinct genus of sea snails

Dondaldina is an extinct genus of high-spired sea snails from the Carboniferous.

The genus was described by James Brookes Knight in 1933.

== Species ==
- † Donaldina dubia Mazaev, 2015
- † Donaldina parva Mazaev, 2015
- † Donaldina sakmaraensis Mazaev, 2020
