= Pseudophoridae =

Pseudophoridae Temporal range: Late Ordovician–Permian

Scientific classification
- Kingdom: Animalia
- Phylum: Mollusca
- Class: Gastropoda
- Order: Archaeogastropoda
- Superfamily: †Pseudophoroidea
- Family: †Pseudophoridae; S. A. Miller, 1889

Synonyms
- Palaeonustidae Wenz, 1938

Extinct family of gastropods

Pseudophoridae is an extinct family of tropical warm-water Paleozoic sea snails. This family is unassigned to superfamily. This family has no subfamilies.
