= Gemmulopsis =

Scientific classification
- Kingdom: Animalia
- Phylum: Mollusca
- Class: Gastropoda
- Subclass: Caenogastropoda
- Order: Neogastropoda
- Superfamily: Conoidea
- Family: Turridae
- Genus: †Gemmulopsis; Tracey & Craig, 2019

Type species
- † Gemmulopsis nigellensis Tracey & Craig, 2019

Genus of gastropods

Gemmulopsis is an extinct genus of sea snails, marine gastropod mollusks in the family Turridae.

== Species ==
Species within the genus Gemmulopsis include:

- † Gemmulopsis nigellensis Tracey & Craig, 2019
