= Volvarina sibuzatiana =

Scientific classification
- Kingdom: Animalia
- Phylum: Mollusca
- Class: Gastropoda
- Subclass: Caenogastropoda
- Order: Neogastropoda
- Family: Marginellidae
- Subfamily: Marginellinae
- Genus: Volvarina
- Species: †V. sibuzatiana

Binomial name
- †Volvarina sibuzatiana Lozouet, 2019

Species of gastropod

Volvarina sibuzatiana is an extinct species of sea snail, a marine gastropod mollusk in the family Marginellidae, the margin snails.

== Distribution ==
Fossils of this marine species were found in Oligocene strata in the Landes, France.
