= Palaeorissoinidae =

Scientific classification
- Kingdom: Animalia
- Phylum: Mollusca
- Class: Gastropoda
- Subclass: Caenogastropoda
- Order: Littorinimorpha
- Superfamily: Rissooidea
- Family: †Palaeorissoinidae; Gründel & Kowalke, 2002

Extinct family of gastropods

Palaeorissoinidae is an extinct family of fossil snails, marine gastropod molluscs in the family Rissooidea.
