= Ectocochleate cephalopod =

Ectocochleate cephalopod Temporal range: late Cambrian–recent

Scientific classification
- Kingdom: Animalia
- Phylum: Mollusca
- Class: Cephalopoda

Group of molluscs

The ectocochleate (externally shelled) cephalopods are the oldest known representatives of their class, dating back to the Cambrian period. Their aragonitic shells are not prone to fossilisation. They contain the modern Nautilus and many fossil forms including the ancient Ellesmerocerida and the ammonoids.
