= Stuoraxidae =

Scientific classification
- Kingdom: Animalia
- Phylum: Mollusca
- Class: Gastropoda
- Superfamily: Omalogyroidea
- Family: †Stuoraxidae; Bandel, 1994

Extinct family of gastropods

The Stuoraxidae is an extinct taxonomic family of fossil sea snails, marine gastropod molluscs in the informal group Lower Heterobranchia.
