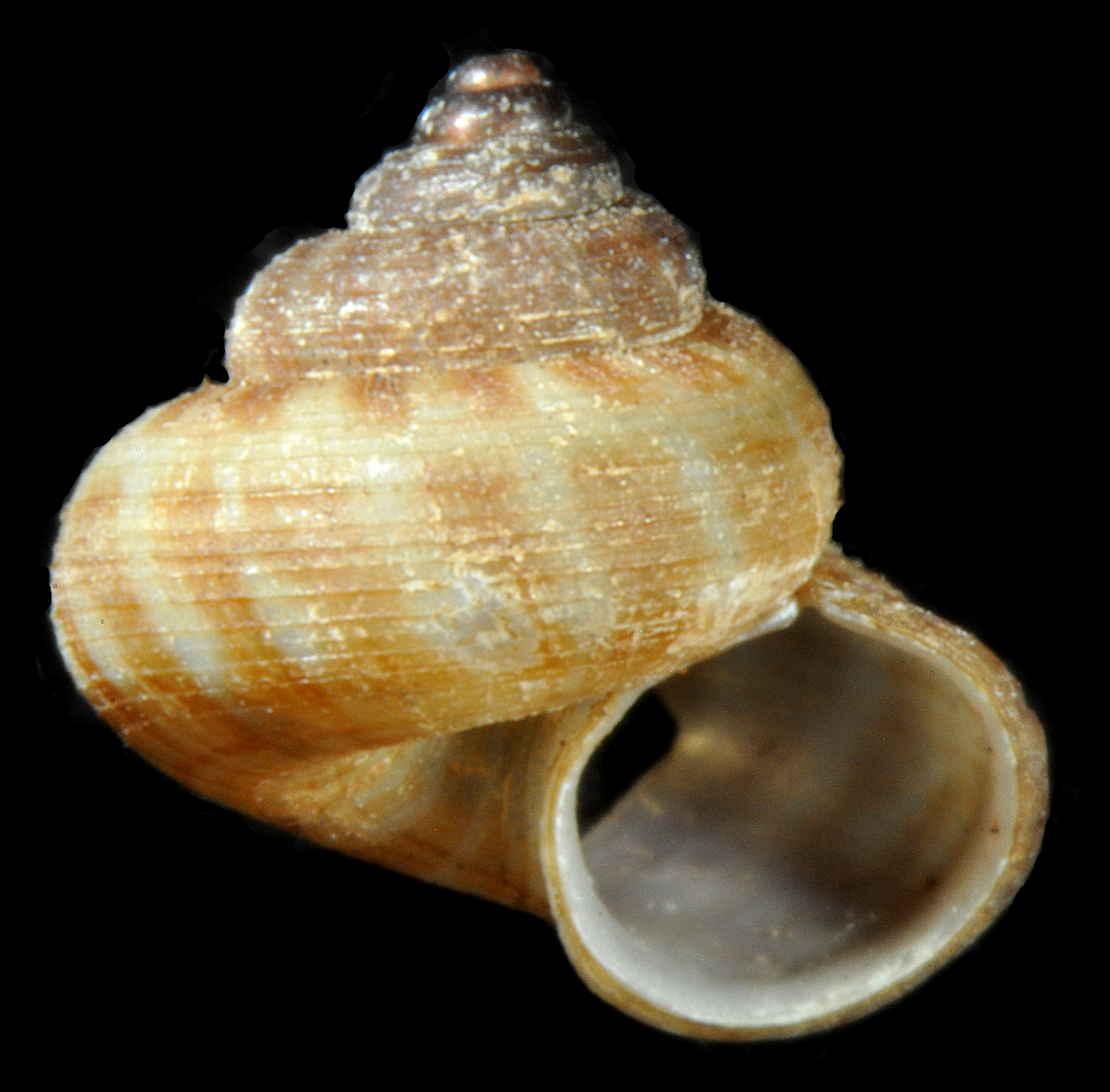
- Shell of Lagocheilus michaui (syntype at MNHN, Paris)

Scientific classification
- Kingdom: Animalia
- Phylum: Mollusca
- Class: Gastropoda
- Subclass: Caenogastropoda
- Order: Architaenioglossa
- Superfamily: Cyclophoroidea
- Family: Cyclophoridae
- Genus: Lagocheilus; Blanford, 1864

Type species
- Cyclophorus scissimargo Benson, 1856

Synonyms
- Cyclophorus (Lagocheilus) W. T. Blanford, 1864; Japonia (Lagocheilus) W.T. Blanford, 1864; Japonia (Lagochilus) P. Fischer, 1885 (unaccepted rank and incorrect subsequent spelling); Lagochilus P. Fischer, 1885 (Invalid: unjustified emendation of Lagocheilus Blanford, 1864; also a junior homonym of Lagochilus Loew, 1860 [Diptera]); Lagochilus (Lagochilus) P. Fischer, 1885

= Lagocheilus =

Lagocheilus Temporal range: Cenomanian-Recent

Genus of gastropods

Lagocheilus is a genus of gastropods in the family Cyclophoridae.

== Species ==
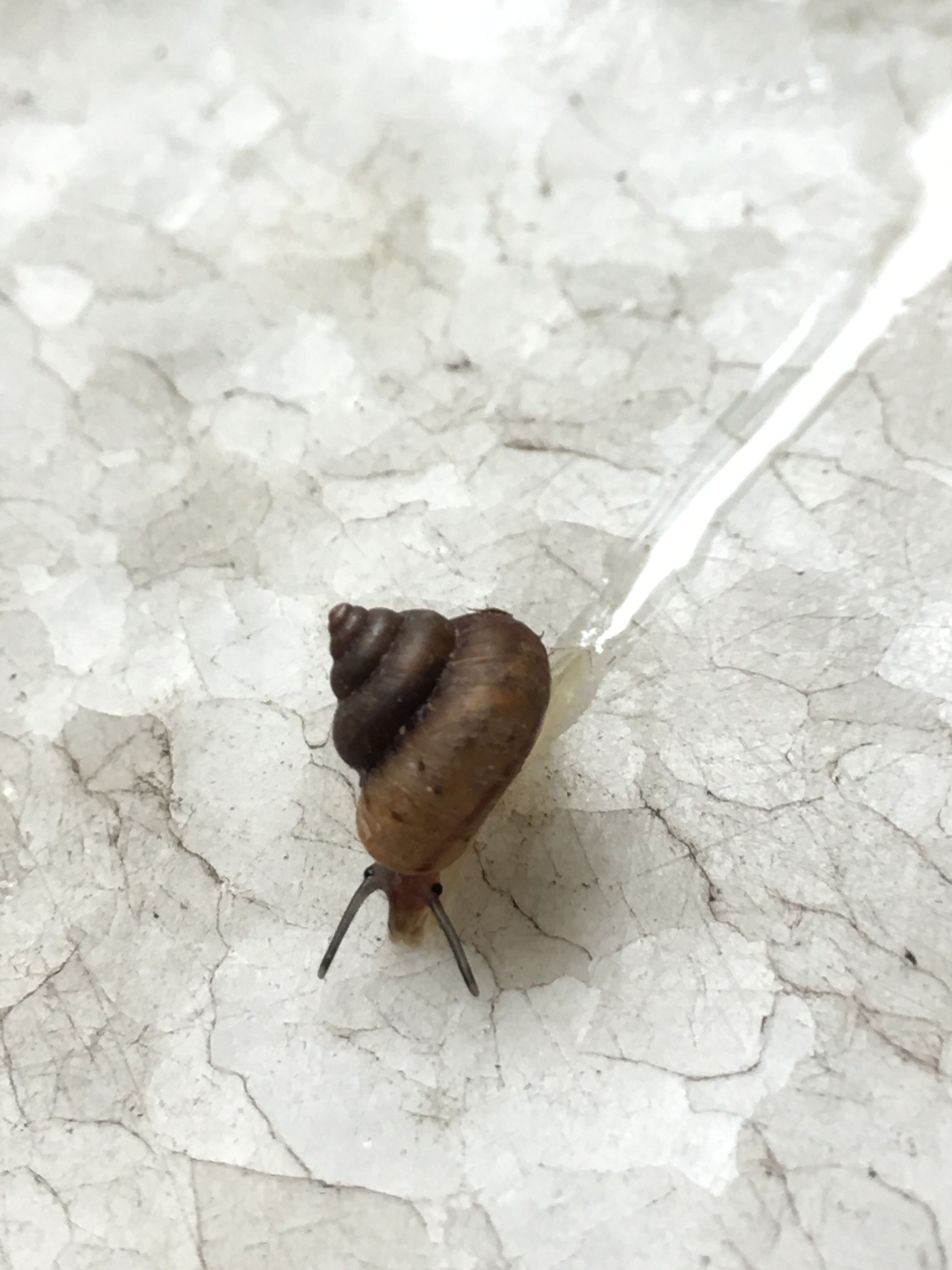
Lagocheilus hungerfordianus

- Lagocheilus acutecingulatus van Benthem Jutting, 1963
- Lagocheilus alticola Laidlaw, 1937
- Lagocheilus aruanus C. R. Boettger, 1922
- Lagocheilus bangueyensis E. A. Smith, 1895
- Lagocheilus barbatus (L. Pfeiffer, 1855)
- Lagocheilus baritensis E. A. Smith, 1893
- Lagocheilus bellulus (E. von Martens, 1865)
- Lagocheilus bellus (E. von Martens, 1872)
- Lagocheilus bifimbriatus Möllendorff, 1890
- Lagocheilus binoyae (Sykes, 1899)
- Lagocheilus borneensis E. A. Smith, 1893
- Lagocheilus brocchus E. von Martens, 1908
- Lagocheilus buginensis P. Sarasin & F. Sarasin, 1899
- Lagocheilus cagayanicus Quadras & Möllendorff, 1895
- Lagocheilus calciphilus van Benthem Jutting, 1963
- Lagocheilus carinulatus Zilch, 1955
- Lagocheilus celebicus P. Sarasin & F. Sarasin, 1899
- Lagocheilus ciliatus (G. B. Sowerby I, 1843)
- Lagocheilus ciliferus (Mousson, 1849)
- Lagocheilus ciliger Gredler, 1887
- Lagocheilus compressum Möllendorff, 1894
- Lagocheilus concavospira Möllendorff, 1902
- Lagocheilus conicus (Martens, 1860)
- Lagocheilus convexus Möllendorff, 1897
- Lagocheilus costulatus Möllendorff, 1900
- † Lagocheilus cretaspira Asato & Hirano, 2019
- Lagocheilus daflaensis Godwin-Austen, 1917
- Lagocheilus depictus (Tapparone Canefri, 1884)
- Lagocheilus dohertyi (Fulton, 1899)
- Lagocheilus drepanophorus van Benthem Jutting, 1958
- Lagocheilus euryomphalus Möllendorff, 1895
- Lagocheilus exiguus E. A. Smith, 1894
- Lagocheilus fischeri Morlet, 1886
- Lagocheilus flaveovariegatus van Benthem Jutting, 1963
- Lagocheilus franzhuberi Thach, 2021
- Lagocheilus galatheae (Mörch, 1872)
- Lagocheilus garelli (Eydoux & Souleyet, 1852)
- Lagocheilus glabratus Möllendorff, 1886
- Lagocheilus grandipilus O. Boettger, 1891
- Lagocheilus grandis Möllendorff, 1890
- Lagocheilus gudei Schepman, 1919
- Lagocheilus guimarasensis (G. B. Sowerby I, 1843)
- Lagocheilus helicoides (G. B. Sowerby I, 1843)
- Lagocheilus humilis Möllendorff, 1897
- Lagocheilus hungerfordianus (Möllendorff, 1881)
- Lagocheilus hypselospirus Möllendorff, 1901
- Lagocheilus inconspicuus P. Sarasin & F. Sarasin, 1899
- Lagocheilus inornatus E. A. Smith, 1893
- Lagocheilus jucundus E. A. Smith, 1893
- Lagocheilus kinabaluensis E. A. Smith, 1895
- Lagocheilus klobukowskii (Morlet, 1885)
- Lagocheilus kobelti Sykes, 1903
- Lagocheilus landesi (Morlet, 1885)
- Lagocheilus laomontanus (L. Pfeiffer, 1863)
- Lagocheilus leporinus W. T. Blanford, 1865
- Lagocheilus liratulus Möllendorff, 1894
- Lagocheilus longipilus Möllendorff, 1884
- Lagocheilus macromphalus Möllendorff, 1897
- Lagocheilus malleatus (W. T. Blanford & H. F. Blanford, 1861)
- Lagocheilus marangensis Aldrich, 1898
- Lagocheilus metcalfei (Issel, 1874)
- Lagocheilus michaui (Crosse & P. Fischer, 1863)
- Lagocheilus mundus van Benthem Jutting, 1959
- Lagocheilus natunensis E. A. Smith, 1894
- Lagocheilus nubeculus van Benthem Jutting, 1963
- Lagocheilus oakesi Godwin-Austen, 1918
- Lagocheilus obianum Möllendorff, 1902
- Lagocheilus obliquistriatus Bullen, 1904
- Lagocheilus occultus Sykes, 1899
- Lagocheilus omphalotropis Möllendorff, 1887
- Lagocheilus pachychilus Möllendorff, 1902
- Lagocheilus pachytropis Möllendorff, 1896
- Lagocheilus papuanus E. A. Smith, 1897
- Lagocheilus parvus (G. B. Sowerby I, 1843)
- Lagocheilus pellicosta (Möllendorff, 1882)
- Lagocheilus phayrei (Theobald, 1870)
- Lagocheilus pilosus Möllendorff, 1884
- Lagocheilus plagiostomaticus van Benthem Jutting, 1958
- Lagocheilus poirieri (Tapparone Canefri, 1883)
- Lagocheilus polynema (Mörch, 1876)
- Lagocheilus polytropis Quadras & Möllendorff, 1895
- Lagocheilus quadrasi Möllendorff, 1887
- Lagocheilus quadricinctus E. A. Smith, 1895
- Lagocheilus quinqueliratus Möllendorff, 1887
- Lagocheilus rabongensis E. A. Smith, 1895
- Lagocheilus reticulatus Möllendorff, 1897
- Lagocheilus roepstorfi (Mörch, 1876)
- Lagocheilus rollei Möllendorff, 1902
- Lagocheilus romblonensis Möllendorff, 1897
- Lagocheilus saetigerus van Benthem Jutting, 1958
- Lagocheilus scalaris Quadras & Möllendorff, 1895
- Lagocheilus scissimargo (Benson, 1856)
- Lagocheilus sexfilaris (Heude, 1882)
- Lagocheilus shiplayi (L. Pfeiffer, 1857)
- Lagocheilus sikhimensis Godwin-Austen, 1917
- Lagocheilus similis E. A. Smith, 1893
- Lagocheilus sirhassenensis E. A. Smith, 1894
- Lagocheilus smithi Kobelt, 1897
- Lagocheilus solidulus Möllendorff, 1894
- Lagocheilus stenomphalus Möllendorff, 1890
- Lagocheilus stephanophorus Möllendorff, 1895
- Lagocheilus striolatus Stoliczka, 1872
- Lagocheilus swettenhami de Morgan, 1885
- Lagocheilus tapparonei Boettger, 1922
- Lagocheilus tenebricosus (A. Adams & Reeve, 1848)
- Lagocheilus tigrinulus Möllendorff, 1891
- Lagocheilus tomotremus (Benson, 1857)
- Lagocheilus townsendi Crosse, 1879
- Lagocheilus trichophorus (Möllendorff, 1881)
- Lagocheilus trochoides Stoliczka, 1872
- Lagocheilus tumidulus Quadras & Möllendorff, 1895
- Lagocheilus umbilicatus (Kobelt, 1886)
- Lagocheilus vescus (Sykes, 1899)
- Lagocheilus warnefordianus G. Nevill, 1878
- Lagocheilus wuellerstorfianus (Zelebor, 1867)

Species brought into synonymy

- †Lagocheilus electrospira Asato & Hirano, 2019: synonym of † Eotrichophorus electrospira (Asato & Hirano in Hirano et al., 2019)
