= Stereoplasmoceratidae =

Stereoplasmoceratidae Temporal range: Ordovician

Scientific classification
- Kingdom: Animalia
- Phylum: Mollusca
- Class: Cephalopoda
- Order: †Orthocerida
- Family: †Stereoplasmoceratidae; Kobayashi, 1934

Extinct family of molluscs

Stereoplasmoceratidae is an extinct family of actively mobile aquatic carnivorous cephalopods belonging to the subclass Orthoceratoidea endemic to what would be Asia during the Ordovician living from 490—457.5 mya, existing for approximately 32.5 million years.

== Taxonomy ==
Stereoplasmoceratidae was named by Kobayashi (1934). It was assigned to Pseudorthocerataceae by Teichert et al. (1964).

== See also ==
- Paleontology
