= 2026 in paleomalacology =

This list records new taxa of fossil molluscs that were announced or described in 2026. Other peer-reviewed publications on discoveries related to paleomalacology which occurred in that year are also detailed here.

== Ammonites ==
Name	Novelty	Status	Authors	Age	Type locality	Country	Notes	Images
Ainoceras boomerangense	Sp. nov		Whittingham et al.	Late Cretaceous (Santonian)	Haslam Formation	Canada (British Columbia)	A member of the family Nostoceratidae.	
Amapondella separoannulum	Sp. nov		Whittingham et al.	Late Cretaceous (Campanian)	Haslam Formation	Canada (British Columbia)	A member of the family Nostoceratidae.	
Ammonitoceras chalense	Sp. nov		Lehmann & Bayliss	Early Cretaceous	Ferruginous Sands	United Kingdom		
Ammonitoceras ochtrupense	Sp. nov		Lehmann & Bayliss	Early Cretaceous	Peine Formation	Germany		
Australiceras dubium	Sp. nov		Lehmann & Bayliss	Early Cretaceous	Ferruginous Sands	United Kingdom		
Australiceras simpsoni	Sp. nov		Lehmann & Bayliss	Early Cretaceous	Ferruginous Sands	United Kingdom		
Baculites laevis	Sp. nov	Valid	Baraboshkin in Baraboshkin et al.	Late Cretaceous (Campanian)		Russia		
Baculites obliquicostatus	Sp. nov	Valid	Baraboshkin in Baraboshkin et al.	Late Cretaceous (Campanian)		Russia		
Baculites obtusus sosvaensis	Ssp. nov	Valid	Baraboshkin in Baraboshkin et al.	Late Cretaceous (Campanian)		Russia		
Baculites obtusus ustmaniensis	Ssp. nov	Valid	Baraboshkin in Baraboshkin et al.	Late Cretaceous (Campanian)		Russia		
Birobagoczkyceras	Gen. et comb. nov	Valid	Frau	Early Cretaceous (Berriasian)		Chile	The type species is "Ammonites" tripartitus Hupé (1854).	
Ceresioceltites	Gen. et comb. nov	Valid	Pieroni & Balini	Middle Triassic		Italy; Switzerland	A member of the family Danubitidae. The type species is "Ammonites" fumagallii Stabile (1860); genus also includes "Celtites" paronai Airaghi (1912) and "Celtites" taramellii Airaghi (1912).	
?Chlupacites eildonensis	Sp. nov		Becker & Earp	Devonian (probably Emsian)	Montys Hut Formation	Australia	A member of the family Agoniatitidae.	
Delanoyites	Gen. et comb. nov	Valid	Fauré et al.	Early Cretaceous (Aptian)		France; Russia; Bulgaria? Italy? United Kingdom?	A member of the family Ancyloceratidae. The type species is "Lithancylus" renatae Pictet et al. (2009); genus also includes "Toxoceratoides" godeti Thieuloy (1990), "Lithancylus" glebi Mikhailova & Baraboshkin (2001), "L." bifurcatus Delanoy et al. (2017), "L." igori Mikhailova & Baraboshkin (2001), "L." russiensis Mikhailova & Baraboshkin (2001) and possibly also "L." tirolensis Casey (1961), "L." pushevensis Nikolov & Parashkevanov (1995), "L." fustis Casey (1961) and "L." tirolensiformis Mikhailova & Baraboshkin (2001).	
Dubariceras faurei	Sp. nov		Benzaggagh & Shapiro	Early Jurassic (Pliensbachian)		Morocco	A member of the superfamily Eoderoceratoidea belonging to the family Dubariceratidae.	
Eckhardites atmensis	Sp. nov	Valid	Mitta in Mitta, Zenina & Meleshin	Middle Jurassic (Bathonian)		Russia	A member of the family Cardioceratidae. Published online in 2026, but the issue date is listed as December 2025.	
Embreeoceras	Gen. et sp. nov		Whittingham et al.	Late Cretaceous (Santonian)	Trent River Formation	Canada (British Columbia)	A member of the family Nostoceratidae. The type species is E. retexum.	
Fissilobiceras franzi	Sp. nov	Valid	Dietze, Auer & Schweigert	Middle Jurassic	Wedelsandstein Formation	Germany	A member of the family Hammatoceratidae.	
Flexoptychites gottardoi	Sp. nov	Valid	Pieroni & Balini	Middle Triassic (Anisian)		Italy	A member of the family Ptychitidae.	
Graefenbergites ingae	Sp. nov	Valid	Wierzbowski	Late Jurassic (Kimmeridgian)		Poland	A member of the family Perisphinctidae.	
Heterocarinella	Gen. et sp. nov	Valid	Aiba	Late Cretaceous (Santonian)		Japan	A member of the family Turrilitidae. The type species is H. japonica.	
Ivoites talenti	Sp. nov		Becker & Earp	Devonian (Emsian)	Norton Gully Sandstone	Australia	A member of the family Anetoceratidae.	
Leonardia	Gen. et sp. et comb. nov		Parent & Garrido	Jurassic-Cretaceous transition	Vaca Muerta	Argentina	A member of the family Himalayitidae. The type species is L. almanzaensis; genus also includes "Berriasella" steinmanni Krantz (1926). The generic name is shared with Leonardia Canefri (1890) and Leonardia Mearns (1905).	
Limusoceras	Gen. et comb. et 2 sp. nov		Whittingham et al.	Late Cretaceous (Turonian to Campanian)		Canada (British Columbia); Japan; Russia (Sakhalin Oblast); United States (Alaska)	A member of the family Nostoceratidae. The type species is "Heteroceras" japonicum Yabe (1904) (the species was also designated as the type species of the genus Ebisuites by Cooper (2024), but Whittingham et al. (2026) do not consider this genus to be valid); genus also includes new species L. neojaponicum and L. traski.	
Otoceras biakovi	Sp. nov	Valid	Kutygin, Konstantinov & Kilyasov	Early Triassic		Russia		
Otoceras suolicum	Sp. nov	Valid	Kutygin, Konstantinov & Kilyasov	Early Triassic		Russia		
Parapopanoceras izosovi	Sp. nov	Valid	Zakharov et al.	Middle Triassic		Russia (Primorsky Krai)		
Parasianites	Gen. et comb. nov	Valid	Leonova	Permian		United States (Texas)	A member of the family Paragastrioceratidae. The type species is "Stenolobulites" admiralensis (Plummer & Scott, 1937); genus also includes "Stenolobulites" subglobosus Mikesh, Glenister & Furnish (1988).	
Pseudohimalayites	Gen. et comb. nov	Valid	Frau	Early Cretaceous (Berriasian–Valanginian)		France	The type species is "Himalayites" nieri (Pictet, 1867).	
Pseudosvetlanoceras	Gen. et comb. nov	Valid	Leonova	Permian	Lenox Hills Formation	United States (Texas)	A member of the family Paragastrioceratidae; a new genus for "Svetlanoceras" moylei Mikesh (1990).	
Quintucoceras	Gen. et 3 sp. et comb. nov	Valid	Parent & Garrido	Early Cretaceous (Valanginian)	Quintuco Formation	Argentina	A member of the family Neocomitidae. The type species is Q. macrospinatum; genus also includes new species Q. pseudowichmanni and Q. denticulatum, as well as "Necomites" wichmanni Leanza (1945).	
Rasaites	Gen. et sp. nov	Valid	Pieroni & Balini	Middle Triassic (Anisian)		Italy	A possible member of the family Hungaritidae. The type species is R. rasaensis.	
Ridzewskyiceras	Gen. et comb. nov	Valid	Baraboshkin & Arkadiev	Early Cretaceous (Barremian)		Russia (North Ossetia–Alania)	A member of the family Hemihoplitidae. The type species is "Acanthoceras" ridzewskyi Karakash (1896).	
Simionescuites	Gen. et 3 sp. nov	Valid	Lăcătuş & Balini in Lăcătuş, Balini & Lazăr	Middle Triassic (Anisian)		Romania	A member of the family Longobarditidae. The type species is S. dobrogeanus; genus also includes S. laevicostatus and S. nodiumbilicatus.	
Stacheoceras resaensis	Sp. nov		Sun & Dai in Sun et al.	Permian (Wuchiapingian)		China	A member of the family Vidrioceratidae.	
Subjaponites	Gen. et comb. nov	Valid	Zakharov et al.	Middle Triassic		Russia (Primorsky Krai)	A member of Pinacoceratoidea belonging to the family Japonitidae. Genus includes "Japonites" russkiensis Zakharov (1968).	
Subthurmannia pacifica	Sp. nov	Valid	Parent & Garrido	Early Cretaceous (Valanginian)	Quintuco Formation	Argentina	A member of the family Neocomitidae.	
Trimaenioceras alegria	Sp. nov	Valid	Allaire et al.	Devonian		Argentina		
Trimaenioceras ivanae	Sp. nov	Valid	Allaire et al.	Devonian		Argentina		
Uralosphinctes	Gen. et comb. nov	Valid	Rogov	Late Jurassic (Kimmeridgian)		Russia	A member of the family Virgatitidae. Genus includes "Virgataxioceras" dividuum Mesezhnikov (1973)	
Yakutosirenites (Mulanites) mulanae	Sp. nov	Valid	Zheng et al.	Late Triassic (Carnian)	Xiaowa Formation	China		

=== Ammonite research ===
- Evidence indicating that, in spite of drops in taxonomic diversity, the morphological complexity of ammonoid shells did not decline during Early Triassic biotic crises is presented by Miao et al. (2026).
- Two ammonite shells with large, elongated projections near their apertures are described from the Lower Triassic strata in the Paris area (Idaho, United States) by Brayard et al. (2026).
- Neige & van Tiel (2026) study the evolutionary history of the family Dactylioceratidae, and interpret the pattern of changes of their taxonomic and morphological diversity as consistent with background extinction, possibly linked to species specialization making them vulnerable to such extinction.
- The easternmost and one of the youngest record of Meneghiniceras known to date is reported from the Lower Jurassic (Toarcian) strata from Karachay-Cherkessia (Russia) by Rogov et al. (2026).
- Schweigert & Dietl (2026) revise the systematics of Spiroceras, Parapatoceras, Acuariceras and Paracuariceras (considered to be a junior synonym of Acuariceras), and interpret Sulcohamites as described on the basis of fossil material of a normally coiled ammonite, not of a heteromorph.
- Schweigert (2026) reports the discovery of a specimen of Chanasia cf. buckmani from the Callovian strata from Prahecq near Niort (France) with morphological similarities to co-occurring Phlycticeras, interpreted as a possible case of zoomimesis.
- Jattiot & Boursicot (2026) describe fossil material of immature haploceratoid ammonites from the Callovian strata from the Montreuil-Bellay locality (France) distinct from known ammonites and possibly representing a population of Taramelliceras taurimontanum with genetically-induced abnormalities.
- A study on the composition of the Late Jurassic (Kimmeridgian) ammonite faunas of the subtilicaelatum and desmoides biohorizons of the Lacunosamergel Formation (Germany) is published by Jantschke et al. (2026).
- Aguirre-Urreta et al. (2026) report evidence of exceptional preservation of the periostracum in specimens of Bochianites neocomiensis and Lissonia riveroi from Vaca Muerta (Argentina), interpreted as indicative of highly conservative composition of the periostracum throughout the evolutionary history of conchiferan molluscs.
- Frau (2026) revises the affinities of the genera Vergunniceras and Paracheloniceras, and names a new subfamily Paracheloniceratinae within the family Douvilleiceratidae.
- A study on the biostratigraphy of the Barremian-Aptian ammonite fossils from the southern edge of the Vercors Urgonian platform (France) is published by Pictet, Ferry & Pietra (2026).
- Kennedy & Klinger (2026) revise the species referred to the subgenus Pervinquieria (Styphloceras), reinterpreting them all as a single variable species Pervinquieria (Pervinquieria) nodosocostata.
- Kennedy & Klinger (2026) identify the genus Rusoceras as a junior synonym of the genus Pervinquieria.
- Nakagawa et al. (2026) report evidence of differences of oxygen and carbon isotopic values in septa and simultaneously formed outer shells of Early Cretaceous (Albian) ammonites from Madagascar, and argue that oxygen isotopic values in ammonite and other cephalopod septa might not reliably reflect seawater temperatures.
- Hefny et al. (2026) revise the composition of Cenomanian and Turonian ammonite assemblages from the strata of the Galala and Umm Omeiyid formations at Wadi Qena (Egypt).
- Jain, Bujtor & Trif (2026) study the composition of the Cenomanian ammonite assemblage from the Cisnădioara locality (Transylvanian Basin; Romania), dominated by taxa with Tethyan biogeographic affinities but also including Indo-Malagasy and southern Mediterranean taxa.
- Bensekhria et al. (2026) study the biostratigraphy of the Albian–Turonian ammonite fossils from the Aurès Basin (Algeria) and compare the composition of the studied ammonite assemblages with those from Tunisia, Western Europe and the Western Interior Seaway, reporting evidence of differences that were likely driven by climatic gradients, marine barriers and variable migration pathways.
- Evidence from the study of an ammonite fossil from the Upper Cretaceous (Coniacian-Santonian) Galembo Formation (Colombia), indicative of utility of fibrous marine cements preserved within chambers of ammonite shells for reconstructions of timing of oceanic anoxic events, is presented by Gamarra-Caicedo et al. (2026).
- Taxonomic revision of members of the genus Canadoceras from the Campanian Orannai Formation (Japan) is published by Shigeta (2026), who identifies Canadoceras minimum as a junior synonym of C. mysticum.
- Kennedy, Kelly & Schneider (2026) describe new fossil material of Campanian and Maastrichtian ammonites from Greenland, providing new information on distribution and biogeography of latest Cretaceous ammonites from the studied area.
- Evidence of morphological differences of members of the genus Gunnarites from distinct locations within the James Ross Basin (Antarctica) is presented by Mohr et al. (2026).
- Doriath-Döhler et al. (2026) present a new quantitative framework for the studies of ammonite shell morphology, using geometric morphometrics to capture three-dimensional shape of successive shell apertures.

== Other cephalopods ==
Name	Novelty	Status	Authors	Age	Type locality	Country	Notes	Images
Caneycycloceras fuerstenbergorum	Sp. nov	Valid	Korn & Aubrechtová	Carboniferous		Germany	A member of Orthoceratida belonging to the family Brachycycloceratidae.	
Caneycycloceras rotersorum	Sp. nov	Valid	Korn & Aubrechtová	Carboniferous		Germany	A member of Orthoceratida belonging to the family Brachycycloceratidae.	
Discoceras alienum	Sp. nov	Valid	Aubrechtová, Korn & Kröger	Ordovician (Katian)		Germany		
Discoceras angustum	Sp. nov	Valid	Aubrechtová, Korn & Kröger	Ordovician (Sandbian or Katian)		Estonia		
Discoceras aseriense	Sp. nov	Valid	Aubrechtová, Korn & Kröger	Ordovician (Darriwilian)		Estonia		
Discoceras brandenburgense	Sp. nov	Valid	Aubrechtová, Korn & Kröger	Ordovician (Katian)		Germany		
Discoceras circulare	Sp. nov	Valid	Aubrechtová, Korn & Kröger	Ordovician (Sandbian)		Estonia; Germany		
Discoceras polonicum	Sp. nov	Valid	Aubrechtová, Korn & Kröger	Ordovician (Katian)		Poland		
Discoceras sovaki	Sp. nov	Valid	Aubrechtová, Korn & Kröger	Ordovician (Katian)		Germany		
Eoceras	Gen. et sp. nov	Valid	Song et al.	Cambrian Stage 3	Shuijingtuo Formation	China	An early siphuncle-bearing cephalopod. Genus includes new species E. shaanxiense.	
Fringillorostrus	Gen. et sp. nov		Ikegami et al.	Late Cretaceous (Maastrichtian)	Fox Hills Formation	United States (South Dakota)	A squid belonging to the group Oegopsida and the family Paleothysanoteuthidae. The type species is F. simplex.	
Lagonibelus pseudonecopinus	Sp. nov	Valid	Efremenko in Dzyuba et al.	Early Cretaceous		Russia	A belemnite belonging to the family Cylindroteuthidae.	
Ninmarooceras	Gen. et 2 sp. nov	Valid	Pohle, Jell & Klug	Cambrian (Furongian)	Ninmaroo Formation	Australia	A member of the family Ellesmeroceratidae. The type species is N. ramosum; genus also includes N. exoundulatum.	
Rhenocycloceras	Gen. et comb. et 4 sp. nov	Valid	Korn & Aubrechtová	Carboniferous		Germany; Ireland; Kyrgyzstan; Morocco	A member of Orthoceratida belonging to the family Brachycycloceratidae. The type species is "Orthoceratites" scalaris d'Archiac & de Verneuil (1842); genus also includes "Orthoceras" randolphensis Worthen (1882), "Cycloceras" meeki Elias (1958), "Orthocera" undata Fleming (1815), "Brachycycloceras" mirabile Shimansky (1968) and "Brachycycloceras" subquadratum Shimansky (1968), as well as new species R. conicum, R. denckmanni, R. macdiarmadai and R. africanum.	
Scuthoteuthis concavus	Sp. nov		Ikegami et al.	Late Cretaceous (Maastrichtian)	Fox Hills Formation	United States (South Dakota)	A squid belonging to the group Oegopsida and the family Scuthoteuthidae.	
Uluciala	Gen. et sp. nov	Valid	Sugiura et al.	Late Cretaceous (Campanian-Maastrichtian)		United States (South Dakota)	A member of Decabrachia of uncertain affinities, with a morphology intermediate between those of members of Sepiida and Sepiolida. The type species is U. rotundata.	
Voroneceras	Gen. et sp. nov	Valid	Shchedukhin	Devonian (Famennian)		Russia (Lipetsk Oblast)	A member of the family Westonoceratidae. Genus includes new species V. rai.	
Wyoteuthis	Gen. et sp. nov	Valid	Ippolitov et al.	Late Jurassic (Oxfordian)	Sundance Formation	United States (Wyoming)	A member of Belemnitida belonging to the family Megateuthididae. The type species is W. linsterorum.	

=== Other cephalopod research ===
- Review of advances in the study of origin, evolution, anatomy and ecology of fossil cephalopods from the preceding years is published by Klug et al. (2026).
- Evidence of impact of distribution of mineral deposits in chambered shells on buoyancy and maneuverability of orthocone cephalopods is presented by Peterman, Landman & Ciampaglio (2026).
- Cichowolski et al. (2026) study the composition of the Ordovician (Tremadocian) cephalopod assemblages from the Coquena and Santa Rosita formations (Argentina) and their biogeographic links with cephalopods from other areas, interpreted as possible evidence that Central Andean Basin was an area of early diversification and a source of dispersal of cephalopods during the Tremadocian.
- Revision of the taxonomic composition of the genus Lobobactrites is published by Shchedukhin (2026).
- Reynolds & Price (2026) review evidence of belemnite ecology and life habits.
- A study on the composition of the belemnite assemblage from the Lower Cretaceous (Valanginian-Barremian) strata from the External Rif (Morocco) is published by Benzaggagh (2026).
- Galácz (2026) interprets Bayanoteuthis rugifer as an Eocene belemnite.
- A study on the early ontogenetic development of shells of members of the genus Boionautilus is published by Turek & Manda (2026), who place the studied genus in the family Lechritrochoceratidae, and transfer "Nautilus" sternbergi to the genus Cumingsoceras.
- Evidence of nautiloid affinities of Pohlsepia mazonensis is provided by Clements et al. (2026), who interpret the studied species as a junior synonym of Paleocadmus pohli.
- Fossils of members of the genus Cenoceras otherwise known from the Aalenian–Bajocian strata from Western Europe are described from the Bathonian strata from the Gnaszyn clay-pit (Poland) by Jain, Salamon & Bălc (2026), extending known geographical and stratigraphical range of the studied nautilids.
- A specimen of Somalinautilus cf. fuscus interpreted as a survivor of three successive and damaging predatory attacks is described from the Bajocian strata of the Oolite ferrugineuse de Bayeux Formation (France) by Schweigert (2026).
- Patarroyo et al. (2026) describe new fossil material of Aturia peruviana from the Paleogene strata of the San Jacinto Formation (Colombia), and interpret their morphology as supporting the classification of Aturia colombiana as a junior synonym of A. peruviana.
- Evidence from the study of extant nautiloid cephalopods and from the study of oxygen isotope shell thermometry of nautiloid fossils, indicating that modern nautiloids live deeper and grow in colder water than any of their extinct relatives other than members of the genus Aturia, is presented by Ward et al. (2026).
- New pseudorthocerid and aulacocerid fossil material is described from the Middle Triassic (Anisian) strata of the Rifu Formation (Japan) by Niko & Ehiro (2026).
- Lukeneder et al. (2026) provide information on the internal architecture of the carbonized fossil structures from the Carnian Polzberg Lagerstätte (Austria) studied by Lukeneder et al. (2022), interpreted as supporting the identification of these structures as coleoid cephalic cartilages.
- Sealey & Lucas (2026) revise the fossil record of Cretaceous ammonites and nautiloids from New Mexico (United States).
- Evidence from the study of fossil material of Nanaimoteuthis jeletzkyi and "Paleocirroteuthis" haggarti (transferred to the genus Nanaimoteuthis) from the Cretaceous strata in Canada and Japan, indicating that Nanaimoteuthis was an octopus belonging to the group Cirrata and that members of this genus were some of the largest known invertebrates and among the largest known Cretaceous marine predators, is presented by Ikegami et al. (2026).
- Jobbins et al. (2026) describe a gladius of a member of the genus Enchoteuthis from the Upper Cretaceous Pierre Shale (Manitoba, Canada) with pathologies interpreted as bite marks produced by a mosasaur or a large fish.
- Evidence of impact of sea surface temperatures and ecological factors on evolutionary rates and on the evolution of morphological diversity of neocoleoid cephalopods is provided by Wang et al. (2026).

== Bivalves ==
Name	Novelty	Status	Authors	Age	Type locality	Location	Notes	Images
Actinopteria grahni	Sp. nov	Valid	Richter et al.	Devonian		Brazil		
Admytilus berezovskyi	Sp. nov		Dominici	Eocene		Italy		
Annulinectes bosona	Nom. nov	Valid	Pacaud in Coan et al.	Triassic		Bosnia and Herzegovina	A replacement name for Pecten subconcentricus Kittl (1904).	
Arca submontensis	Sp. nov	Valid	Merle	Late Cretaceous (Maastrichtian)		France		
Arcopsis? fuchsi	Sp. nov		Dominici	Eocene		Italy		
Avicula seneca	Nom. nov	Valid	Pacaud in Coan et al.	Silurian (Llandovery)		United States (Ohio)	A replacement name for Avicula subretroflexa d'Orbigny (1850).	
Barbatia danisei	Sp. nov		Dominici	Eocene		Italy		
Barbatia forlii	Sp. nov		Dominici	Eocene		Italy		
Bathytormus sparnacensis	Sp. nov	Valid	Merle	Late Cretaceous (Maastrichtian)		France		
Bicornucopina acuminata	Sp. nov	Valid	Masse et al.	Early Cretaceous (Barremian-Aptian)		France	A member of the family Monopleuridae.	
Botula kaeoensis	Sp. nov		Eagle in Eagle & Hayward	Eocene	Ruatangata Sandstone	New Zealand	A species of Botula.	
Camptonectes orbiculatus	Sp. nov		Dominici	Eocene		Italy		
Cardita degregorioi	Sp. nov		Dominici	Eocene		Italy		
Ceromyella loysensis	Nom. nov	Valid	Pacaud in Coan et al.	Late Jurassic (Oxfordian)		France	A replacement name for Isocardia brevis d'Orbigny (1850).	
Chama loubryi	Sp. nov	Valid	Merle	Late Cretaceous (Maastrichtian)		France		
Chaperinella	Nom. nov	Valid	Pacaud in Coan et al.	Late Cretaceous (Cenomanian)		France	A rudist bivalve belonging to the family Caprotinidae; a replacement name for Chaperia Munier‑Chalmas (1882).	
Concavodonta varius	Sp. nov	Valid	Wang, Zhan & Fang	Ordovician (Katian)	Xiazhen Formation	China	A member of the family Praenuculidae.	
Corbicula hilarionis	Sp. nov		Dominici	Eocene		Italy		
Corbula darpahnensis	Sp. nov	Valid	Kiel & Hadi in Kiel et al.	Miocene		Iran		
Corbula javadvipa	Nom. nov	Valid	Pacaud in Coan et al.	Miocene-Pliocene		Indonesia	A replacement name for Corbula socialis Martin (1879).	
Crassatella arieja	Nom. nov	Valid	Pacaud in Coan et al.	Paleocene (Thanetian)		France	A replacement name for Crassatella quadrata Leymerie (1878).	
Crassatella kovacsi	Sp. nov		Dominici	Eocene		Italy		
Crassatella vinassai	Sp. nov		Dominici	Eocene		Italy		
Ctenoides stenoi	Sp. nov		Dominici	Eocene		Italy		
Cyathodonta garillii	Sp. nov		Dominici	Eocene		Italy		
Cyathodonta gilardeti	Nom. nov	Valid	Pacaud in Pacaud et al.	Eocene		France	A species of Cyathodonta; a replacement name for Thracia rugosa Bellardi (1852).	
Cyathodonta patavina	Sp. nov		Dominici	Eocene		Italy		
Cyathodonta tarbelliana	Sp. nov	Valid	Pacaud et al.	Eocene	Brassempouy Limestone	France	A species of Cyathodonta.	
Eoplicatula nianduoensis	Sp. nov		Li et al.	Early Jurassic (Hettangian)	Germig Formation	China		
Fidera flexa	Sp. nov		Wang et al.	Ordovician	Koumenzi Formation	China		
Fontladrei	Gen. et sp. nov	Valid	Chaix & Grenier	Late Cretaceous (Campanian)		France	A member of the family Lucinidae. The type species is F. jebraki.	
Freneixicardia darpae	Sp. nov		Dominici	Eocene		Italy		
?Gafrarium troendlei	Sp. nov	Valid	Merle in Salvat et al.	Plio-Pleistocene		French Polynesia	A member of the family Veneridae.	
Gari novacula	Sp. nov		Dominici	Eocene		Italy		
Glycymeris alponensis	Sp. nov		Dominici	Eocene		Italy		
Glycymeris ciupii	Sp. nov		Dominici	Eocene		Italy		
Gracilicosta	Gen. et comb. nov	Valid	Biakov	Permian		Russia	Genus includes "Streblopteria" gracilicosta Biakov (2023).	
Gryphaea (?Africogryphaea) geniculata	Sp. nov	Valid	Fürsich & Ayoub-Hannaa in Sadji et al.	Late Jurassic	Sfissifa Formation	Algeria	A member of the family Gryphaeidae.	
Halicardia toyamaensis	Sp. nov	Valid	Kawase & Ichihara	Miocene	Kurosedani Formation	Japan	A species of Halicardia.	
Hilarifragum	Gen. nov		Dominici	Eocene		Italy		
Homopleura parva	Sp. nov	Valid	Masse et al.	Early Cretaceous (Aptian)		France	A member of the family Monopleuridae.	
Horiopleura arabica	Sp. nov	Valid	Masse et al.	Early Cretaceous (Aptian)	Qishn Formation	Oman	A member of the family Polyconitidae.	
Horiopleura helviorum	Sp. nov	Valid	Masse et al.	Early Cretaceous (Aptian)		France	A member of the family Polyconitidae.	
Hypelasma fritzlangi	Sp. nov	Valid	Schneider & Werner	Late Jurassic (Kimmeridgian)	Frankenalb Formation	Germany	A rudist bivalve belonging to the family Requieniidae.	
Indotellina fakaauensis	Sp. nov	Valid	Merle in Salvat et al.	Plio-Pleistocene		French Polynesia	A member of the family Tellinidae.	
Isoarca minima	Sp. nov		Ayoub-Hannaa & Fürsich in Ayoub-Hannaa, Fürsich & Abdelhady	Middle Jurassic (Bathonian to Callovian)	Kehailia Formation	Egypt	A member of Nuculanida belonging to the family Isoarcidae.	
Limopsis venetorum	Sp. nov		Dominici	Eocene		Italy		
Liostrea paucistriata	Sp. nov		Ayoub-Hannaa & Fürsich in Ayoub-Hannaa, Fürsich & Abdelhady	Middle Jurassic (Bajocian to Callovian)	Kehailia Formation	Egypt		
Lithophaga pacaudi	Sp. nov		Dominici	Eocene		Italy		
Loxocardium italicum	Sp. nov		Dominici	Eocene		Italy		
?Lunulicardia distorta	Sp. nov	Valid	Merle in Salvat et al.	Plio-Pleistocene		French Polynesia	Possibly a species of Lunulicardia.	
Lunulicardia videsotti	Sp. nov		Dominici	Eocene		Italy		
Margaritifera araujensis	Sp. nov		Delvene & Munt in Delvene et al.	Early Cretaceous (Albian)	Escucha Formation	Spain	A species of Margaritifera.	
Mazaevella	Gen. et comb. nov	Valid	Shilekhin, Biakov & Vdovichenko	Carboniferous-Permian (Gzhelian-Sakmarian)		Russia	A member of Pectinida belonging to the family Annuliconchidae. The type species is "Annuliconcha" placunensis Nelzina (1958). Published online in 2026, but the issue date is listed as December 2025.	
Miocardiopsis boboki	Sp. nov		Dominici	Eocene		Italy		
Miocardiopsis merlei	Sp. nov		Dominici	Eocene		Italy		
Modiolus hilarionis	Sp. nov		Dominici	Eocene		Italy		
Myostyla	Gen. et sp. nov	Valid	Masse et al.	Early Cretaceous (Aptian)		France	A member of the family Monopleuridae. The type species is M. ardescensis.	
Nipponocardium	Gen. et comb. nov	Valid	Amano & Haga	Miocene-Pleistocene		Japan	A member of the family Cardiidae, subfamily Laevicardiinae. The type species is Cardium shiobarense Yokoyama (1926).	
Nucula bauti	Sp. nov	Valid	Merle	Late Cretaceous (Maastrichtian)		France		
Opisoma romeroi	Sp. nov	Valid	Cuesta et al.	Early Jurassic		Argentina	A member of the family Astartidae.	
Palaeoneilo rectus	Sp. nov	Valid	Wang, Zhan & Fang	Ordovician (Katian)	Xiazhen Formation	China	A member of the family Cucullellidae.	
Panopea ombonii	Sp. nov		Dominici	Eocene		Italy		
Paraleptopecten aurelioi	Sp. nov	Valid	Santelli, Río & Rojas	Miocene	Gran Bajo del Gualicho Formation	Argentina	A scallop.	
Periploma puteolis	Nom. nov	Valid	Pacaud in Coan et al.	Middle Jurassic (Callovian)		France	A replacement name for Pleuromya subelongata d'Orbigny (1850).	
Pleuromya campuslitensis	Nom. nov	Valid	Pacaud in Coan et al.	Late Jurassic (Oxfordian)		France	A replacement name for Pleuromya subelongata Étallon (1864).	
Plicatula pacaudi	Sp. nov	Valid	Merle	Late Cretaceous (Maastrichtian)		France		
Praecaprina paquieri	Sp. nov	Valid	Masse et al.	Early Cretaceous (Aptian)		France	A member of the family Caprinidae.	
Praecaprina tubifera	Sp. nov	Valid	Masse et al.	Early Cretaceous (Aptian)		France	A member of the family Caprinidae.	
Praecaprina vacua	Sp. nov	Valid	Masse et al.	Early Cretaceous (Aptian)		France	A member of the family Caprinidae.	
Protocardia magharensis	Sp. nov		Ayoub-Hannaa & Fürsich in Ayoub-Hannaa, Fürsich & Abdelhady	Middle Jurassic (Bathonian)	Kehailia Formation	Egypt		
Protopotomida	Gen. et sp. nov		Delvene & Munt in Delvene et al.	Early Cretaceous (Albian)	Escucha Formation	Spain	A member of the family Unionidae. The type species is P. ariniensis.	
Pseudexogyra	Gen. et sp. nov	Valid	Fürsich & Ayoub-Hannaa in Sadji et al.	Late Jurassic	Sfissifa Formation	Algeria	A member of the family Ostreidae. The type species is P. euryhalina.	
Pycnodonte dainellii	Sp. nov		Dominici	Eocene		Italy		
Pycnodonte seguieri	Sp. nov		Dominici	Eocene		Italy		
Saalidiceras	Gen. et sp. nov	Valid	Schneider & Werner	Late Jurassic (Kimmeridgian)	Frankenalb Formation	Germany	A rudist bivalve belonging to the family Epidiceratidae. The type species is S. syllai.	
Scambula leve	Sp. nov		Dominici	Eocene		Italy		
Serratina zuschini	Sp. nov		Dominici	Eocene		Italy		
Similodonta minor	Sp. nov	Valid	Wang, Zhan & Fang	Ordovician (Katian)	Xiazhen Formation	China	A member of the family Similodontidae.	
Syncyclonema goyi	Sp. nov	Valid	Callapez, Barroso-Barcenilla, Berrocal-Casero & Pimentel in Callapez et al.	Late Cretaceous (Cenomanian)	Trouxemil Formation	Portugal	A member of the family Entoliidae.	
Thracia sixi	Sp. nov	Valid	Pacaud et al.	Eocene	Brassempouy Limestone	France	A species of Thracia.	
Thyasira obesula	Sp. nov	Valid	Chaix & Grenier	Late Cretaceous (Campanian)		France	A species of Thyasira.	
Trapezium ulysses	Sp. nov		Dominici	Eocene		Italy		
Trigonoconcha brevis	Sp. nov	Valid	Wang, Zhan & Fang	Ordovician (Katian)	Xiazhen Formation	China	A member of the family Similodontidae.	
Tugonia fabianii	Sp. nov		Dominici	Eocene		Italy		
"Unio" escuchana	Sp. nov		Delvene & Munt in Delvene et al.	Early Cretaceous (Albian)	Escucha Formation	Spain	A member of the family Unionidae.	
Valclusella	Gen. et 2 sp. nov	Valid	Masse et al.	Early Cretaceous (Barremian-Aptian)		France	A member of the family Monopleuridae. The type species is V. valclusensis; genus also includes V. biconvexa.	
Venus algarrobensis	Nom. nov	Valid	Pacaud in Coan et al.	Cretaceous		Chile	A replacement name for Venus subsulcata Philippi (1887).	
Venus blancheae	Nom. nov	Valid	Pacaud in Coan et al.	Oligocene to Miocene		Austria; Germany	A replacement name for Venus subrugosa d'Orbigny (1852).	
Venus sindhu	Nom. nov	Valid	Pacaud in Coan et al.			Pakistan	A replacement name for Venus subovalis d'Archiac (1854).	
Zemysia? pala	Sp. nov		Dominici	Eocene		Italy		

=== Bivalve research ===
- Vermeij (2026) studies the evolution of functionally important traits in brachiopods and bivalves, interprets the bivalve morphology as providing them with a broader range of adaptive possibilities compared to brachiopods, reports evidence indicating that traits linked to post-Paleozoic proliferation of bivalves first evolved in early and middle Paleozoic, and argues that the proliferation of bivalves was linked to changes of environmental conditions after Paleozoic to ones that bivalves were better suited to accommodate compared to brachiopods.
- Vinn & Dernov (2026) identify depressions in the internal mould of Leptodesma from the Carboniferous strata from Kazakhstan, interpreted as most likely to be traces of blister pearls.
- Mottin et al. (2026) report the discovery of a new marine bivalve fauna from the postglacial strata of the Permian Rio Bonito Formation (Santa Catarina, Brazil), correlate it with interglacial deposits of the Itararé Group 400 km to the north, and interpret Permian bivalve assemblages from southwestern Gondwana as indicating that glacial conditions associated with the Late Paleozoic icehouse persisted in the northern part of the Paraná Basin for a longer time than in the southern and central parts.
- A review of all published Paleozoic parallelodontid genus- and species-group names is published by Friedel, Neubauer & Amler (2026).
- Suárez & Hautmann (2026) study the taxonomic diversity and distinctness of Triassic marine bivalves, and argue that their recovery in the aftermath of the Permian–Triassic extinction event continued at least until the Norian.
- Redescription of the inoceramid species "Parainoceramya" pseudoretrorsa and a study on its geographic and stratigraphic distribution is published by Shilekhin & Rogov (2026).
- Evidence of utility of the study of rudist shells from the Maastrichtian Cárdenas Formation (Mexico) in reconstruction of environmental conditions in the western Tethys Ocean during the Cretaceous is presented by Juárez-Aguilar et al. (2026).
- Delvene et al. (2026) report evidence of preservation of elements of the reproductive system in specimens of Margaritifera valdensis from the Lower Cretaceous strata from the Isle of Wight (United Kingdom), and evidence of preservation of fossil embryos indicative of gill brooding in Early Cretaceous unionoid bivalves.
- The first fossil bivalve pearl from the Cretaceous of Russia is reported from the Turonian strata of the Losevo section in the Voronezh Oblast by Shilekhin, Kalabin & Shchedukhin (2026).
- Pérez, Mosquera & Cuitiño (2026) report the discovery of fossil material of Limopsis insolita from the Miocene Gaiman Formation (Argentina), extending its known geographic distribution northwards and representing the first unambiguous record of a member of the genus Limopsis in deeper-water settings in the region.
- Knight (2026) studies the composition of two assemblages of Miocene (Tortonian) bivalves from S'Algar (Menorca, Spain), interpreted as originating from a middle ramp environment that changed through time as a result of changes in the frequency and directionality of storms and currents.
- Amano, Hamuro & Hamuro (2026) describe new fossil material of Nipponocrassatella osawanoensis and "Oxyperas" osawanoensis from the Miocene strata of the Kurosedani Formation (Japan), and allocate the latter species to the genus Pseudoxyperas.
- Amano (2026) describes new thyasirid and vesicomyid fossil material from the Pleistocene strata of the Umegase Formation (Japan), transfers "Thyasira" inflata Yabe & Nomura (1925) to the genus Maorithyas, and coins a replacement name Mendicula angolensis for the extant species Thyasira (Mendicula) inflata Payne & Allen (1991).
- Osipova et al. (2026) revise the composition of the venerid assemblage from the Pleistocene Szekou Formation (Taiwan).
- Evidence from the study of bivalves from the Pleistocene and Holocene strata from Florida (United States) and Italy, indicating that trematode infestation caused abnormal morphological development of shells of affected bivalves and that hampers species delineation and morphometric analyses of fossil bivalves, is presented by Jang et al. (2026).

== Gastropods ==
Name	Novelty	Status	Authors	Age	Type locality	Location	Notes	Images
Acrostemma anatolica	Sp. nov	Valid	Harzhauser, Landau & Malaquias	Miocene	Týrtar Formation	Turkey	A member of the family Cylichnidae.	
Acteon antipinguis	Sp. nov	Valid	Harzhauser, Landau & Malaquias	Miocene	Grund Formation	Austria; Hungary; Poland; Romania	A species of Acteon.	
Acteon gutta	Sp. nov	Valid	Harzhauser, Landau & Malaquias	Miocene	Dej Formation	Hungary; Romania	A species of Acteon.	
Acteon romanicus	Sp. nov	Valid	Harzhauser, Landau & Malaquias	Miocene	Dej Formation	Romania	A species of Acteon.	
Acteon trifasciatus	Sp. nov	Valid	Harzhauser, Landau & Malaquias	Miocene	Grund Formation	Austria; Germany?	A species of Acteon.	
Acteon viciani	Sp. nov	Valid	Harzhauser, Landau & Malaquias	Miocene	Pétervására Formation	Hungary	A species of Acteon.	
Acteon vindobonensis	Sp. nov	Valid	Harzhauser, Landau & Malaquias	Miocene	Baden Formation	Austria	A species of Acteon.	
Acteonella murcielaguensis	Sp. nov	Valid	Aguilar et al.	Late Cretaceous (Maastrichtian)	El Viejo Formation	Costa Rica		
Aglaianilla	Gen. et 2 sp. et comb. nov	Valid	Harzhauser, Micali & Landau	Miocene and Pliocene		Czech Republic; Italy; Romania; Spain	A member of the family Pyramidellidae. The type species is A. aglaia; genus also includes new species A. auxo, as well as "Turbonilla" malacitana Landau & Micali (2021) and "Turbonilla" peculiaris Tabanelli et al. (2023).	
Alcithopsis	Gen. et sp. nov	Valid	Merle & Pacaud	Eocene		France	A member of the family Volutidae. The type species is A. insperata.	
Allmoniella ? citriformis	Sp. nov	Valid	Dolin & Garvie	Eocene	Cook Mountain Formation	United States (Texas)	A member of the family Ovulidae belonging to the subfamily Eocypraeinae.	
Allmoniella lupinus	Sp. nov	Valid	Dolin & Garvie	Eocene	Cook Mountain Formation	United States (Texas)	A member of the family Ovulidae belonging to the subfamily Eocypraeinae.	
Alvania friedbergi	Sp. nov		Landau et al.	Miocene		Ukraine		
Alvania gozhiki	Sp. nov		Landau et al.	Miocene		Ukraine		
Alvania mirandae	Sp. nov		Landau et al.	Miocene		Ukraine		
Alvania parvampulla	Sp. nov		Landau et al.	Miocene		Ukraine		
Alvania parvimirandae	Sp. nov		Landau et al.	Miocene		Ukraine		
Alvania waclawbaluki	Sp. nov		Landau et al.	Miocene		Ukraine		
Alvania zadorozhnyii	Sp. nov		Landau et al.	Miocene		Ukraine		
Alvania zilchi	Sp. nov		Landau et al.	Miocene		Ukraine		
Amplogladius wrigleyi	Nom. nov	Valid	Kovács et al.			United Kingdom	A member of the family Rostellariidae.	
Ampullina lenisculpta	Sp. nov		Saha, Das & Mondal	Late Jurassic		India		
Ampullina oxfordiensis	Sp. nov		Saha, Das & Mondal	Late Jurassic		India		
Angaria dalmadeakae	Sp. nov	Valid	Kovács et al.	Eocene		Hungary	A species of Angaria.	
Angulariopsis	Gen. et comb. nov	Valid	Monari et al.	Late Triassic (Rhaetian) and Early Jurassic (Hettangian)		Austria; France; Luxembourg	A member of the family Purpurinidae. The type species is "Angularia" nivernensis Dareste de la Chavanne (1912); genus also includes "Angularia" corallina Nützel et al. (2022).	
Anthracocycla	Gen. et sp. et comb. nov	Valid	Matamales-Andreu	Eocene and Oligocene	Peguera Formation	Spain	A possible member of the family Helicodontidae. The type species is A. decipiens; genus also includes "Lychnosis" hermitei Vidal (1917).	
Antelopites	Gen. et comb. nov	Valid	Neubauer & Páll-Gergely in Páll-Gergely et al.	Cretaceous (Albian–Cenomanian)		United States (Wyoming)	The type species is "Parateinostoma" altispirale Yen (1951).	
Anularya bengu	Sp. nov	Valid	Xiang, Wang, He & Lv in Xiang et al.	Neogene	Xiaolongtan Formation	China	A species of Anularya.	
Asiaharpa javanensis	Sp. nov	Valid	Altaba & Dovesi	Miocene		Indonesia	A member of the family Harpidae.	
Asmundanilla	Gen. et comb. nov	Valid	Harzhauser, Micali & Landau	Miocene		Romania	A member of the family Pyramidellidae. The type species is "Turbonilla (Pyrgostylus)" bimonilifera Boettger (1902); genus also includes "Turbonilla (Pyrgostylus)" selecta Boettger (1902).	
Ataxocerithium ireki	Sp. nov	Valid	Harzhauser & Landau	Miocene	Pińczów Formation	Poland; Slovakia		
Ataxocerithium palotasae	Sp. nov	Valid	Harzhauser & Landau	Miocene	Baden Formation	Austria; Czech Republic; Poland; Romania		
Athleta caunelha	Sp. nov	Valid	Pacaud, Ledon & Garcia	Eocene		France	A species of Athleta.	
Athleta cazesi	Sp. nov	Valid	Pacaud, Ledon & Garcia	Eocene		France	A species of Athleta.	
Athleta loubryi	Sp. nov	Valid	Pacaud, Ledon & Garcia	Eocene		France	A species of Athleta.	
Athleta maxencei	Sp. nov	Valid	Pacaud, Ledon & Garcia	Eocene		France	A species of Athleta.	
Athleta szumzeri	Sp. nov	Valid	Kovács et al.	Eocene		Hungary	A species of Athleta.	
Attiliosa juditae	Sp. nov	Valid	Kovács & Vicián	Miocene		Hungary		
Barneystrombus nigromaculus	Sp. nov	Valid	Maxwell & Zheng	Pliocene		Indonesia		
Barycypraea angustipyga	Sp. nov	Valid	Lorenz	Neogene		Indonesia	A member of the family Cypraeidae.	
Barycypraea diabolica	Sp. nov	Valid	Lorenz	Neogene		Indonesia	A member of the family Cypraeidae.	
Bela sossoi	Nom. nov		Landau et al.	Miocene		Ukraine	A replacement name for Bela? robusta Scarponi et al. (2016).	
Bela tatarinovi	Sp. nov		Landau et al.	Miocene		Ukraine		
Bezanconia zsuzsannae	Sp. nov	Valid	Kovács et al.	Eocene		Hungary	A member of the family Cerithiidae.	
Bittium biskupici	Sp. nov	Valid	Harzhauser & Landau	Miocene	Baden Formation	Austria	A species of Bittium.	
Bittium castori	Sp. nov	Valid	Harzhauser & Landau	Miocene	Dej Formation	Romania	A species of Bittium.	
Bittium pallgergelyi	Sp. nov	Valid	Harzhauser & Landau	Miocene	Baden Formation	Austria	A species of Bittium.	
Bittium parvapyramis	Sp. nov	Valid	Harzhauser & Landau	Miocene		Ukraine	A species of Bittium.	
Bittium polluxi	Sp. nov	Valid	Harzhauser & Landau	Miocene	Dej Formation	Romania	A species of Bittium.	
Bourguetia bipartita	Sp. nov	Valid	Monari et al.	Early Jurassic (Hettangian)	Luxembourg Sandstone	Luxembourg	A member of the family Pseudomelaniidae.	
Brachytrema hantonensis	Nom. nov	Valid	Pacaud in Coan et al.	Middle Jurassic		United Kingdom	A member of the family Brachytrematidae; a replacement name for Brachytrema buvignieri Morris & Lycett (1851).	
Brouchilda	Gen. et 2 sp. et comb. nov	Valid	Monari et al.	Early Jurassic (Hettangian)	Luxembourg Sandstone	France; Luxembourg	A member of the family Mathildidae. The type species is B. laevigata; genus also includes new species B. mulleri, as well as "Promathildia" bicarinata Dareste de la Chavanne (1912).	
Bruggemania	Gen. et comb. nov	Valid	Petuch & Berschauer	Pliocene and Pleistocene	Waccamaw Formation	United States (Florida; North Carolina)	A member of the family Volutidae. The type species is "Scaphella" precursor Gardner (1948).	
Buccinanops halleri	Sp. nov	Valid	Pérez et al.	Miocene	Gaiman Formation	Argentina	A species of Buccinanops.	
Bufonaria chabaharensis	Sp. nov	Valid	Kiel & Hadi in Kiel et al.	Miocene		Iran		
Bulla? elalbanii	Sp. nov	Valid	Harzhauser, Landau & Malaquias	Miocene		Ukraine	Possibly a species of Bulla.	
Bulla niauensis	Sp. nov	Valid	Merle in Salvat et al.	Plio-Pleistocene		French Polynesia	A species of Bulla.	
Calliomphalus (Planolateralus) montenati	Sp. nov	Valid	Merle	Late Cretaceous (Maastrichtian)		France		
Calliostoma gallaensis	Sp. nov	Valid	Kovács et al.	Eocene		Hungary	A species of Calliostoma.	
?Calliostoma monswavinarensis	Sp. nov	Valid	Merle	Late Cretaceous (Maastrichtian)		France		
Calliostoma radoslavi	Sp. nov	Valid	Kovács et al.	Eocene		Hungary	A species of Calliostoma.	
Campanile metaisi	Sp. nov	Valid	Merle & Pacaud in Merle et al.	Eocene	Lakhra Formation	Pakistan	A species of Campanile.	
Campanistylus	Gen. et sp. nov	Valid	Merle & Pacaud in Merle et al.	Eocene	Lakhra Formation	Pakistan	A member of the family Campanilidae. The type species is C. lakhraensis.	
Cancilla makranensis	Sp. nov	Valid	Kiel & Hadi in Kiel et al.	Miocene		Iran		
Carboathleta	Gen. et comb. nov	Valid	Kovács et al.	Eocene		Hungary	The type species is "Voluta" pseudobulbosa Strausz (1966).	
Cerithiopsis s.l. alexnuetzeli	Sp. nov	Valid	Harzhauser & Landau	Miocene	Baden Formation	Austria		
Cerithiopsis s.l. bifida	Sp. nov	Valid	Harzhauser & Landau	Miocene	Baden Formation	Austria; Czech Republic		
Cerithiopsis (s. l.) gorkai	Sp. nov		Landau et al.	Miocene		Ukraine		
Cerithiopsis kozlovi''	Sp. nov		Landau et al.	Miocene		Ukraine		
Cerithiopsis columnaeformis	Sp. nov	Valid	Harzhauser & Landau	Miocene	Baden Formation	Austria		
Cerithiopsis gemini	Sp. nov	Valid	Harzhauser & Landau	Miocene	Baden Formation	Austria; Czech Republic		
Cerithiopsis s.l. lima	Sp. nov	Valid	Harzhauser & Landau	Miocene	Dej Formation	Austria; Romania		
Cerithiopsis s.l. nanocancellata	Sp. nov	Valid	Harzhauser & Landau	Miocene	Dej Formation	Hungary; Romania; Slovakia		
Cerithiopsis paratethyca	Sp. nov	Valid	Harzhauser & Landau	Miocene	Dej Formation	Austria; Hungary; Romania		
Cerithiopsis s.l. pimentai	Sp. nov	Valid	Harzhauser & Landau	Miocene	Baden Formation	Austria		
Cerithiopsis s.l. supressa	Sp. nov	Valid	Harzhauser & Landau	Miocene	Baden Formation	Austria; Czech Republic		
Cerithium bardhani	Sp. nov	Valid	Bose et al.	Miocene	Gaj Formation	India	A species of Cerithium.	
Cerithium indicus	Sp. nov		Saha, Das & Mondal	Late Jurassic		India		
Cerithium niauense	Sp. nov	Valid	Merle in Salvat et al.	Pliocene to late Holocene		French Polynesia	A species of Cerithium.	
Cerithium sanctusmichaelis	Nom. nov	Valid	Pacaud in Coan et al.	Late Jurassic (Oxfordian)		France	A replacement name for Cerithium crassilabrum d'Orbigny (1850).	
Chartronella lakhaparensis	Sp. nov		Saha, Das & Mondal	Late Jurassic		India	A member of the family Paraturbinidae.	
Chartronella mundhanensis	Sp. nov		Saha, Das & Mondal	Late Jurassic		India	A member of the family Paraturbinidae.	
Chelidonura piseraii	Sp. nov	Valid	Harzhauser, Landau & Malaquias	Miocene	Pińczów Formation	Poland	A species of Chelidonura.	
Chelotia academia	Sp. nov	Valid	Kovács et al.	Eocene		Hungary	A member of the family Pleurotomariidae.	
Chemnitzia dione	Sp. nov	Valid	Harzhauser, Micali & Landau	Miocene		Romania		
Chemnitzia kelaino	Sp. nov	Valid	Harzhauser, Micali & Landau	Miocene		Hungary		
Chemnitzia merope	Sp. nov	Valid	Harzhauser, Micali & Landau	Miocene		Austria		
Chemnitzia nephele	Sp. nov	Valid	Harzhauser, Micali & Landau	Miocene		Romania		
Chemnitzia phaio	Sp. nov	Valid	Harzhauser, Micali & Landau	Miocene		Romania		
Chemnitzia pleione	Sp. nov	Valid	Harzhauser, Micali & Landau	Miocene		Austria		
Chemnitzia polyxo	Sp. nov	Valid	Harzhauser, Micali & Landau	Miocene		Austria		
Chemnitzia sandrae	Nom. nov	Valid	Pacaud in Coan et al.	Late Triassic (Carnian)	San Cassiano Formation	Italy	A replacement name for Turritella supraplecta gracilis Klipstein (1845).	
Chemnitzia taygete	Sp. nov	Valid	Harzhauser, Micali & Landau	Miocene		Romania		
Chevallieria herenchuki	Sp. nov		Landau et al.	Miocene		Ukraine		
Cigclirina costai	Sp. nov	Valid	Landau & Monsecour	Pliocene		Dominican Republic		
Cingulina erebos	Sp. nov	Valid	Harzhauser, Micali & Landau	Miocene		Romania		
Cipangopaludina somnumbra	Sp. nov	Valid	Xiang, Wang, He & Xie in Xiang et al.	Neogene	Ciying Formation	China	A species of Cipangopaludina.	
Clathropsis dira	Sp. nov	Valid	Harzhauser & Landau	Miocene	Dej Formation	Romania		
?Clelandella saurashtraensis	Sp. nov	Valid	Bose et al.	Miocene	Gaj Formation	India	Possibly a species of Clelandella.	
?Clypeostoma vertusensis	Sp. nov	Valid	Merle	Late Cretaceous (Maastrichtian)		France		
Colombellina crassigranulata	Sp. nov	Valid	Bakayeva et al.	Late Jurassic		Bulgaria	A member of the family Colombellinidae.	
Colubratriton istvangurdoni	Sp. nov	Valid	Kovács et al.	Eocene		Hungary	A member of the family Cancellariidae.	
Columbella petiti	Sp. nov	Valid	Landau & Monsecour	Pliocene		Dominican Republic		
Columbella vermeiji	Sp. nov	Valid	Landau & Monsecour	Pliocene		Dominican Republic		
Conotomaria stoliczkai	Sp. nov		Ghosh et al.	Late Cretaceous		India	A member of the family Pleurotomariidae.	
Contrasimnia praecedens	Sp. nov	Valid	Dolin & Garvie	Eocene	Cook Mountain Formation	United States (Texas)	A member of the family Ovulidae belonging to the subfamily Eocypraeinae.	
Conus georgesrichardi	Sp. nov	Valid	Merle in Salvat et al.	Plio-Pleistocene		French Polynesia	A species of Conus.	
Conus letourneuxi	Sp. nov	Valid	Merle in Salvat et al.	Plio-Pleistocene		French Polynesia	A species of Conus.	
Coralliophila janosi	Sp. nov	Valid	Kovács & Vicián	Miocene		Hungary		
Cosmioconcha sowerbyi	Sp. nov	Valid	Landau & Monsecour	Miocene		Dominican Republic		
Costoanachis hickmanae	Sp. nov	Valid	Landau & Monsecour	Miocene		Dominican Republic		
Costoanachis pflugi	Sp. nov	Valid	Landau & Monsecour	Pliocene		Dominican Republic		
Cotonopsis gearyae	Sp. nov	Valid	Landau & Monsecour	Miocene		Dominican Republic		
Cribrarula complanata	Sp. nov	Valid	Lorenz	Neogene		Indonesia	A species of Cribrarula.	
Cribrarula exigua	Sp. nov	Valid	Bergonzoni	Oligocene		Oman	A species of Cribrarula.	
Cylichna atacosensis	Sp. nov	Valid	Masse et al.	Paleocene (Thanetian)		France	A species of Cylichna.	
Cylichna caudex	Sp. nov	Valid	Harzhauser, Landau & Malaquias	Miocene	Grund Formation	Austria; Hungary; Poland	A species of Cylichna.	
Cylichna dolium	Sp. nov	Valid	Harzhauser, Landau & Malaquias	Miocene	Baden Formation	Austria; Czech Republic	A species of Cylichna.	
Cylichna eschnerae	Sp. nov	Valid	Harzhauser, Landau & Malaquias	Miocene		Czech Republic	A species of Cylichna.	
Cylichna miosimplex	Sp. nov	Valid	Harzhauser, Landau & Malaquias	Miocene	Baden Formation	Austria; Czech Republic	A species of Cylichna.	
Cylichna steiningeri	Sp. nov	Valid	Harzhauser, Landau & Malaquias	Miocene	Fels Formation	Austria	A species of Cylichna.	
Cylichna straussi	Sp. nov	Valid	Harzhauser, Landau & Malaquias	Miocene	Fels Formation	Austria	A species of Cylichna.	
Cymbularia sinensis	Sp. nov		Li et al.	Ordovician (Katian)	Koumenzi Formation	China	A member of the family Bellerophontidae.	
Cypraedia areolata	Sp. nov	Valid	Celzard, Alberti & Pacaud	Eocene		Italy		
Cypraedia fusiformis	Sp. nov	Valid	Celzard, Alberti & Pacaud	Eocene		Italy		
Cypraedia gracilis	Sp. nov	Valid	Celzard, Alberti & Pacaud	Eocene		Italy		
Cypraedia minima	Sp. nov	Valid	Celzard, Alberti & Pacaud	Eocene		Italy		
Cypraedia oppenheimi	Sp. nov	Valid	Celzard, Alberti & Pacaud	Eocene		Italy		
Cypraedia pyriformis	Sp. nov	Valid	Celzard, Alberti & Pacaud	Eocene		Italy		
Cyproglobina demyanovi	Sp. nov	Valid	Pacaud	Eocene		Ukraine	A member of the family Cypraeidae.	
Dakshinatomaria	Gen. et sp. nov		Ghosh et al.	Late Cretaceous		India	A member of the family Pleurotomariidae. Genus includes new species D. rajendrai.	
Dalipaludina zhaolu	Sp. nov	Valid	Xiang, Wang, He & Chen in Xiang et al.	Neogene	Ciying Formation	China	A member of the family Viviparidae.	
Digitolabrum juttae	Sp. nov	Valid	Kovács et al.	Eocene		Hungary		
Drilliola tongresiana	Nom. nov	Valid	Pacaud in Coan et al.	Oligocene (Rupelian)		Belgium	A member of the family Borsoniidae; a replacement name for Pleurotoma nystii d'Orbigny (1852).	
Dudarsagitta	Gen. et sp. nov		Dominici	Eocene		Hungary	A member of the family Batillariidae. Genus includes new species D. hungarica. The original generic name Harzhauseria is preoccupied by Harzhauseria Neubauer & Wesselingh (2023), necessitating creation of the replacement name.	
Ebenomitra anistratenkorum	Sp. nov		Landau et al.	Miocene		Ukraine		
Ecphora (Powhatan) gardnerae jeffersoni	Ssp. nov	Valid	Petuch & Berschauer	Miocene	Eastover Formation	United States (Maryland; Virginia)	A member of the family Muricidae.	
Elachisina (s. l.) dilatilabris	Sp. nov		Landau et al.	Miocene		Ukraine		
Endopachychilus liveranii	Sp. nov	Valid	Kovács et al.	Eocene		Hungary		
Ensaimadina	Gen. et 2 sp. nov	Valid	Matamales-Andreu	Oligocene	Cala Blanca Formation	Spain	A possible member of the family Helicodontidae. The type species is E. mallorquina; genus also includes E. bauzai.	
Eoconus dudarensis	Sp. nov	Valid	Kovács et al.	Eocene		Hungary		
Eoconus konradi	Sp. nov	Valid	Kovács et al.	Eocene		Hungary		
Eovolva texensis	Sp. nov	Valid	Dolin & Garvie	Eocene	Weches Formation	United States (Texas)	A member of the family Ovulidae belonging to the subfamily Cypraediinae.	
Epalxis martae	Sp. nov	Valid	Kovács et al.	Eocene		Hungary		
Episcomitra gradata	Sp. nov	Valid	Demyanov & Pacaud	Eocene		Ukraine	A species of Episcomitra.	
Erronea epimikes	Sp. nov	Valid	Lorenz	Neogene		Indonesia	A member of the family Cypraeidae.	
Euryzone albosensis	Nom. nov	Valid	Pacaud in Coan et al.	Devonian		Austria	A replacement name for Pleurotomaria (Euryzone) coluber var. alpina Spitz (1907).	
Euterpenilla	Gen. et 2 sp. nov	Valid	Harzhauser, Micali & Landau	Miocene		Romania	A member of the family Pyramidellidae. The type species is E. euterpe; genus also includes new species E. eurynome.	
Euthria winogradskyi	Sp. nov		Landau et al.	Miocene		Ukraine		
Falsathleta	Gen. et sp. nov	Valid	Kovács et al.	Eocene		Hungary	Genus includes new species F. zoltani.	
Falsuszafrona emilyvokesae	Sp. nov	Valid	Landau & Monsecour	Pliocene		Dominican Republic		
Falsuszafrona haroldvokesi	Sp. nov	Valid	Landau & Monsecour	Pliocene		Dominican Republic		
Favartia roberti	Sp. nov	Valid	Forli, Cresti & Pagli			Italy	A species of Favartia.	
Fimbrivasum bulgaricum	Sp. nov	Valid	Bakayeva et al.	Early Cretaceous (Barremian)	Gorna Oryahovitsa Formation	Bulgaria	A member of the family Vasidae.	
Ficatrivia eszterae	Sp. nov	Valid	Kovács et al.	Eocene		Hungary		
Ficus nexilis hungarica	Ssp. nov	Valid	Kovács et al.	Eocene		Hungary	A member of the family Ficidae.	
Flexopteron agnesae	Sp. nov	Valid	Kovács & Vicián	Miocene		Hungary		
Fusinus bouchardae	Sp. nov	Valid	Merle	Late Cretaceous (Maastrichtian)		France		
Garviea cervicula	Sp. nov	Valid	Dolin & Garvie	Eocene	Weches Formation	United States (Texas)	A member of the family Ovulidae belonging to the subfamily Eocypraeinae.	
Garviea prunellum	Sp. nov	Valid	Dolin & Garvie	Eocene	Weches Formation	United States (Texas)	A member of the family Ovulidae belonging to the subfamily Eocypraeinae.	
Garviea wallensis	Sp. nov	Valid	Dolin & Garvie	Eocene	Weches Formation	United States (Texas)	A member of the family Ovulidae belonging to the subfamily Eocypraeinae.	
Gibbula strauszi	Sp. nov	Valid	Kovács et al.	Eocene		Hungary	A species of Gibbula.	
Gigantocrossia	Gen. et sp. et comb. nov	Valid	Dolin & Garvie	Eocene	Weches Formation	France; Senegal; United States (Texas)	A member of the family Cypraeidae belonging to the subfamily Cyproglobininae. The type species is G. riobravo; genus also includes "Cypraea (Umbilia)" furoni Tessier (1952) and "Cyproglobina" leroyi Dolin & Aguerre (2016).	
Globicypraea celestelindae	Sp. nov	Valid	Bergonzoni	Oligocene		Oman	A member of the family Cypraeidae.	
Globularia delsatei	Sp. nov	Valid	Monari et al.	Early Jurassic (Hettangian)	Luxembourg Sandstone	Luxembourg		
Globulocerithium gallaense	Sp. nov	Valid	Kovács et al.	Eocene		Hungary	A member of the family Cerithiidae.	
Granulolabium cretaceum	Sp. nov	Valid	Merle	Late Cretaceous (Maastrichtian)		France		
Graphis tisiphone	Sp. nov	Valid	Harzhauser, Micali & Landau	Miocene		Romania		
Gruendelifusus	Gen. et sp. nov	Valid	Monari et al.	Early Jurassic (Hettangian)	Luxembourg Sandstone	Luxembourg	A possible member of the superfamily Mathildoidea. The type species is G. melusinae.	
Haustator bergierensis	Sp. nov	Valid	Merle	Late Cretaceous (Maastrichtian)		France		
Helicacanthus pernegrei	Nom. nov	Valid	Pacaud in Coan et al.	Late Cretaceous (Cenomanian)		France	A member of the family Nododelphinulidae; a replacement name for Turbo octavius d'Orbigny (1850).	
Hemiconus arpadzsoldosi	Sp. nov	Valid	Kovács et al.	Eocene		Hungary		
Hesychianola	Gen. et comb. et sp. nov	Valid	Harzhauser, Micali & Landau	Miocene		Czech Republic; Romania	A member of the family Pyramidellidae. The type species is "Turbonilla (Pyrgolamprus)" paraterebralis Boettger (1902); genus also includes new species H. hesychia, as well as "Turbonilla (Pyrgolampros) pseudoterebralis" var. explicatula Sacco (1892).	
Horologica elektra	Sp. nov	Valid	Harzhauser & Landau	Miocene	Dej Formation	Romania		
Horologica meganodulosa	Sp. nov	Valid	Harzhauser & Landau	Miocene	Dej Formation	Romania		
Horologica morus	Sp. nov	Valid	Harzhauser & Landau	Miocene	Dej Formation	Romania		
Horologica perugiai	Sp. nov	Valid	Harzhauser & Landau	Miocene	Dej Formation	Romania		
Iberus royobolivari	Nom. nov	Valid	Talaván Serna & Talaván Gómez	Miocene		Spain	A replacement name for Helix bolivari Royo Gómez (1922).	
Indomaria kutchensis	Sp. nov		Saha, Das & Mondal	Late Jurassic		India		
Iniforis vindobonensis	Sp. nov	Valid	Harzhauser & Landau	Miocene	Baden Formation	Austria; Romania		
Javacypraea acclaranda	Sp. nov	Valid	Lorenz	Neogene		Indonesia	A member of the family Cypraeidae.	
Javacypraea furuncula	Sp. nov	Valid	Lorenz	Neogene		Indonesia	A member of the family Cypraeidae.	
Javacypraea pustula	Sp. nov	Valid	Lorenz	Neogene		Indonesia	A member of the family Cypraeidae.	
Jenneria lorenzi	Sp. nov	Valid	Celzard	Miocene		Indonesia	A member of the family Ovulidae.	
Joculator ellipticus	Sp. nov	Valid	Harzhauser & Landau	Miocene	Dej Formation	Romania		
Joculator philippei	Sp. nov	Valid	Harzhauser & Landau	Miocene	Baden Formation	Austria		
Joculator pustulosus	Sp. nov	Valid	Harzhauser & Landau	Miocene	Dej Formation	Austria; Romania		
Jujubinus dwarkaensis	Sp. nov	Valid	Bose et al.	Miocene	Gaj Formation	India	A species of Jujubinus.	
Jurazyga	Gen. et comb. nov	Valid	Monari et al.	Early Jurassic (Hettangian and Pliensbachian)		France; Italy; Luxembourg	A member of the family Zygopleuridae. The type species is "Melania" theodori Terquem (1855); genus also includes "Zygopleura" subnodosa (d'Orbigny 1850), "Zygopleura" vinosimonensis Fischer & Weber (1997), "Chemnitzia" polyplecta Gemmellaro (1878), "Chemnitzia" moorei Gemmellaro (1878), "Chemnitzia" appenninica Gemmellaro (1878) and "Chemnitzia" veturia Gemmellaro (1878).	
Kaimella	Gen. et sp. nov	Valid	Monari et al.	Early Jurassic (Hettangian)	Luxembourg Sandstone	Luxembourg	A possible member of the family Cimidae. The type species is K. tenuilineata.	
Lanzarotessacia	Gen. et sp. nov	Valid	Groh & Hutterer	Pliocene		Spain (Canary Islands)	A member of the family Ferussaciidae. Genus includes new species L. chicoensis.	
Lozouetina megahani	Sp. nov	Valid	Dolin & Garvie	Eocene	Cook Mountain Formation	United States (Texas)	A member of the family Ovulidae belonging to the subfamily Pediculariinae.	
Luria liveranii	Sp. nov	Valid	Bergonzoni	Oligocene		Oman	A species of Luria.	
Lychnopsis applanata	Sp. nov	Valid	Matamales-Andreu	Oligocene	Cala Blanca Formation	Spain	A possible member of the family Helicodontidae.	
Lychnopsis juarezi	Sp. nov	Valid	Matamales-Andreu	Oligocene	Cala Blanca Formation	Spain	A possible member of the family Helicodontidae.	
Lyncina compacta	Sp. nov	Valid	Bergonzoni	Oligocene		Oman	A species of Lyncina.	
Lyncina crassilabiata	Sp. nov	Valid	Bergonzoni	Oligocene		Oman	A species of Lyncina.	
Lyncina janreuteri	Sp. nov	Valid	Lorenz	Neogene		Indonesia		
Lyrofusus koeneni	Nom. nov	Valid	Kovács et al.					
Lyrofusus veberi	Sp. nov	Valid	Kovács et al.	Eocene		Hungary		
Macgintopsis mauryae	Sp. nov	Valid	Landau & Monsecour	Miocene		Dominican Republic		
Maestratia omanensis	Sp. nov	Valid	Bergonzoni	Oligocene		Oman	A member of the family Cypraeidae.	
Manzonia laskarevi	Sp. nov		Landau et al.	Miocene		Ukraine		
Manzonia pseudoscalaris	Sp. nov		Landau et al.	Miocene		Ukraine		
Marginella pannonica	Sp. nov	Valid	Vicián & Kovács	Miocene	Lajta Limestone	Hungary		
Marshallopsis jansseni	Sp. nov	Valid	Harzhauser & Landau	Miocene	Dej Formation	Romania		
Marshallopsis vasilyani	Sp. nov	Valid	Harzhauser & Landau	Miocene	Dej Formation	Romania		
Mauritia absoluta	Sp. nov	Valid	Lorenz	Neogene		Indonesia	A member of the family Cypraeidae.	
Mauritia inabsoluta	Sp. nov	Valid	Lorenz	Neogene		Indonesia	A member of the family Cypraeidae.	
Mauritia plioarabica	Sp. nov	Valid	Lorenz	Neogene		Indonesia	A member of the family Cypraeidae.	
Mazatlania freiheiti	Sp. nov	Valid	Landau & Monsecour	Miocene		Dominican Republic		
Megalovicetia	Gen. et comb. nov	Valid	Kovács et al.	Eocene		France; Hungary; Italy	A member of the family Cypraeidae. The type species is "Vicetia" bizzottoi Dominici, Fornasiero & Giusberti (2020); genus also includes "Ovula" bellardii Bellardi (1852).	
Metisnilla metis	Sp. nov	Valid	Harzhauser, Micali & Landau	Miocene		Romania	A member of the family Pyramidellidae.	
Metaconulus evanicsi	Sp. nov	Valid	Kovács et al.	Eocene		Hungary		
Microschiza pauciornata	Sp. nov	Valid	Monari et al.	Early Jurassic (Hettangian)	Luxembourg Sandstone	Luxembourg	A member of the family Purpuroideidae.	
Miolyncina virgiliana	Sp. nov	Valid	Bergonzoni	Oligocene		Oman	A member of the family Cypraeidae.	
Miracypraea	Gen. et 2 sp. nov	Valid	Pacaud, Gómez-García & Celzard	Eocene		Hungary; Spain	A member of the superfamily Cypraeoidea belonging to the family Eocypraeidae. The type species is M. alluensis; genus also includes M. zitae Kovács et al.	
Mitrella beui	Sp. nov	Valid	Landau & Monsecour	Pliocene		Dominican Republic		
Mitrella grovesi	Sp. nov	Valid	Landau & Monsecour	Pliocene		Dominican Republic		
Mitrella hodsoni	Sp. nov	Valid	Landau & Monsecour	Miocene		Dominican Republic		
Mitrella horodokensis	Sp. nov		Landau et al.	Miocene		Ukraine		
Mitrella ingrami	Sp. nov	Valid	Landau & Monsecour	Pliocene		Dominican Republic		
Mitrella paraturgidula	Sp. nov		Landau et al.	Miocene		Ukraine		
Mohrensternia breviangulata	Sp. nov		Landau et al.	Miocene		Ukraine		
Mohrensternia tuzyakae	Sp. nov		Landau et al.	Miocene		Ukraine		
Monophorus balteatus	Sp. nov	Valid	Harzhauser & Landau	Miocene	Dej Formation	Austria; Hungary; Romania; Slovakia; Ukraine		
Mormula kyma	Sp. nov	Valid	Harzhauser, Micali & Landau	Miocene		Romania		
Murexsul pliozezae	Sp. nov	Valid	Forli, Cresti & Pagli			Italy	A species of Murexsul.	
Naria microhelvola	Sp. nov	Valid	Lorenz	Neogene		Indonesia	A member of the family Cypraeidae.	
Naria porarina	Sp. nov	Valid	Lorenz	Neogene		Indonesia	A member of the family Cypraeidae.	
Naria quasierosa	Sp. nov	Valid	Lorenz	Neogene		Indonesia	A member of the family Cypraeidae.	
Nassarina pseudoglypta	Sp. nov	Valid	Landau & Monsecour			Dominican Republic		
Nassarina williamdalli	Sp. nov	Valid	Landau & Monsecour	Pliocene		Dominican Republic		
Nassarius anisi	Sp. nov	Valid	Bose et al.	Miocene	Gaj Formation	India	A species of Nassarius.	
Neritopsis mortuaaqua	Nom. nov	Valid	Pacaud in Coan et al.	Cretaceous (possibly Barremian)		France	A member of the family Neritopsidae; a replacement name for Fusus delphinulus d'Orbigny (1850).	
Neubaueriella	Gen. et comb. nov	Valid	Harzhauser, Landau & Malaquias	Miocene		Austria; Czech Republic; Hungary; Romania; Slovakia	A member of the family Haminoeidae; a new genus for "Atys (Alicula)" lapugyensis Berger (1949).	
Nitidella johnsoni	Sp. nov	Valid	Landau & Monsecour	Miocene		Dominican Republic		
Niveria ukrainica	Sp. nov		Landau et al.	Miocene		Ukraine		
Nodulus pupoides	Sp. nov		Landau et al.	Miocene		Ukraine		
Nummogaultina granata	Nom. nov	Valid	Pacaud in Coan et al.	Early Cretaceous (Albian)		France	A member of the family Turbinidae; a replacement name for Solarium granosum d'Orbigny (1842).	
Obtusella parvobesa	Sp. nov		Landau et al.	Miocene		Ukraine		
Obtusella pseudomacilenta	Sp. nov		Landau et al.	Miocene		Ukraine		
Ocenebra inzanii	Sp. nov	Valid	Kovács & Vicián	Miocene		Hungary		
Oleginina krutskevychi	Sp. nov		Landau et al.	Miocene		Ukraine		
Omphalotrochus bulibiya	Nom. nov	Valid	Pacaud in Coan et al.	Carboniferous		Bolivia	A member of the family Euomphalidae; a replacement name for Solarium antiquum d'Orbigny (1839).	
Oonia feidtorum	Sp. nov	Valid	Monari et al.	Early Jurassic (Hettangian)	Luxembourg Sandstone	Luxembourg	A member of the family Ampullinidae.	
Oonia haasi	Sp. nov	Valid	Monari et al.	Early Jurassic (Hettangian)	Luxembourg Sandstone	Luxembourg	A member of the family Ampullinidae.	
Palmadusta giromontina	Sp. nov	Valid	Lorenz	Neogene		Indonesia	A member of the family Cypraeidae.	
Paracerithium jhuraensis	Sp. nov		Saha, Das & Mondal	Late Jurassic		India		
Paracerithium malmica	Sp. nov		Saha, Das & Mondal	Late Jurassic		India		
Parapyrgiscus orea	Sp. nov	Valid	Harzhauser, Micali & Landau	Miocene		Czech Republic	A member of the family Pyramidellidae.	
Paraturbonilla pliocaenica	Sp. nov	Valid	Harzhauser, Micali & Landau	Pliocene		Spain		
Parietiplicatum kalaallitianum	Sp. nov	Valid	Pacaud	Paleocene	Agatdal Formation	Greenland	A member of the family Acteonidae.	
Parietiplicatum tanasi	Nom. nov	Valid	Pacaud	Late Cretaceous (Campanian-Maastrichtian)		United States (Tennessee)	A member of the family Acteonidae; a replacement name for Acteon conicus Wade (1926).	
Parietiplicatum tenuistriatum	Sp. nov	Valid	Pacaud	Paleocene	Agatdal Formation	Greenland	A member of the family Acteonidae.	
Parthenina alkyone	Sp. nov	Valid	Harzhauser, Micali & Landau	Miocene		Romania		
Parthenina beroe	Sp. nov	Valid	Harzhauser, Micali & Landau	Miocene		Austria		
Parthenina dodona	Sp. nov	Valid	Harzhauser, Micali & Landau	Miocene		Czech Republic		
Parthenina eidyia	Sp. nov	Valid	Harzhauser, Micali & Landau	Miocene		Austria		
Parthenina erato	Sp. nov	Valid	Harzhauser, Micali & Landau	Miocene		Poland		
Parthenina keto	Sp. nov	Valid	Harzhauser, Micali & Landau	Miocene		Austria		
Parthenina nofronii	Sp. nov	Valid	Harzhauser, Micali & Landau	Miocene		Ukraine		
Parthenina sagaritis	Sp. nov	Valid	Harzhauser, Micali & Landau	Miocene		Romania		
Parthenina steini	Sp. nov	Valid	Harzhauser, Micali & Landau	Miocene		Romania		
Parthenina thalia	Sp. nov	Valid	Harzhauser, Micali & Landau	Miocene		Austria		
Parvanachis nehmi	Sp. nov	Valid	Landau & Monsecour	Miocene		Dominican Republic		
Parvanachis silvai	Sp. nov	Valid	Landau & Monsecour	Miocene		Dominican Republic		
Peramphiperas	Gen. et comb. nov	Valid	Dolin & Garvie	Eocene	Reklaw Formation	United States (Texas)	A member of the family Ovulidae belonging to the subfamily Sulcocypraeinae. The type species is "Cypraeorbis" bulbus Garvie (1996).	
Phanerotrema albosensis	Nom. nov	Valid	Pacaud in Coan et al.	Devonian		Austria	A replacement name for Pleurotomaria (Phanerotrema) labrosa var. alpina Spitz (1907).	
Phenacovolva polita	Sp. nov	Valid	Celzard	Miocene		Indonesia	A member of the family Ovulidae.	
Phyllocoma letkesensis	Sp. nov	Valid	Kovács & Vicián	Miocene		Hungary		
Plesioharpa	Gen. et comb. nov		Altaba & Dovesi	Oligocene		Peru	A member of the family Harpidae. The type species is "Harpa" myrmia Olsson (1931).	
Pleurotomaria bajocassiana	Nom. nov	Valid	Pacaud in Coan et al.	Middle Jurassic (Bajocian)		France	A replacement name for Pleurotomaria unisulcata d'Orbigny (1856).	
Pleurotomaria laurenti	Sp. nov	Valid	Chaix & Grenier	Late Cretaceous (Campanian)		France		
Plicopyrazus massalia	Nom. nov	Valid	Pacaud in Coan et al.	Late Cretaceous		France	A replacement name for Cerithium provinciale d'Orbigny (1843).	
Potamides praefraterculus	Sp. nov		Landau et al.	Miocene		Ukraine		
Priscoficus laszloi	Sp. nov	Valid	Kovács et al.	Eocene		Hungary		
Propustularia peculiaris	Sp. nov	Valid	Lorenz	Neogene		Indonesia	A member of the family Cypraeidae.	
Protocypraedia creberrima	Sp. nov	Valid	Celzard, Alberti & Pacaud	Eocene		Italy		
Pseudavena bella	Sp. nov	Valid	Harzhauser, Landau & Malaquias	Miocene		Czech Republic	A member of Heterobranchia of uncertain affinities.	
Pseudochileutomia striata	Sp. nov		Landau et al.	Miocene		Ukraine		
Pseudocypraea alba	Sp. nov	Valid	Celzard	Miocene		Indonesia	A member of the family Ovulidae.	
Pseudocypraea charlenae	Sp. nov	Valid	Celzard & Pacaud	Pliocene		Indonesia		
Pseudolivella albaresensis	Sp. nov	Valid	Masse et al.	Eocene (Ypresian)		France	An olive snail.	
?Pseudopisania cretacea	Sp. nov	Valid	Merle	Late Cretaceous (Maastrichtian)		France		
Purpuradusta tridens	Sp. nov	Valid	Lorenz	Neogene		Indonesia	A member of the family Cypraeidae.	
Purpurarissacia	Gen. et sp. nov	Valid	Groh & Hutterer	Pliocene		Spain (Canary Islands)	A member of the family Ferussaciidae. Genus includes new species P. banki.	
Pusia zalutskyii	Sp. nov		Landau et al.	Miocene		Ukraine		
Pustularia proglobulus	Sp. nov	Valid	Lorenz	Neogene		Indonesia	A member of the family Cypraeidae.	
Pyrgiscus ananke	Sp. nov	Valid	Harzhauser, Micali & Landau	Miocene		Romania		
Pyrgiscus karya	Sp. nov	Valid	Harzhauser, Micali & Landau	Miocene		Austria		
Pyrgiscus pasiphe	Sp. nov	Valid	Harzhauser, Micali & Landau	Miocene		Romania		
Pyrgostylus adarsteia	Sp. nov	Valid	Harzhauser, Micali & Landau	Miocene		Austria		
Pyrgostylus asterope	Sp. nov	Valid	Harzhauser, Micali & Landau	Miocene		Austria		
Pyrgostylus lachesis	Sp. nov	Valid	Harzhauser, Micali & Landau	Miocene		Austria		
Pyrgulina alekto	Sp. nov	Valid	Harzhauser, Micali & Landau	Miocene		Hungary		
Pyrgulina hesione	Sp. nov	Valid	Harzhauser, Micali & Landau	Miocene		Romania		
Pyrgulina moira	Sp. nov	Valid	Harzhauser, Micali & Landau	Miocene		Romania		
Pyrunculus microromanicus	Sp. nov	Valid	Harzhauser, Landau & Malaquias	Miocene	Dej Formation	Romania	A member of the family Retusidae.	
Pyrunculus szobiensis	Sp. nov	Valid	Harzhauser, Landau & Malaquias	Miocene		Austria; Hungary	A member of the family Retusidae.	
Pyrunculus zuschini	Sp. nov	Valid	Harzhauser, Landau & Malaquias	Miocene	Baden Formation	Austria; Romania	A member of the family Retusidae.	
Qilianodiscus	Gen. et sp. nov		Li et al.	Ordovician (Katian)	Koumenzi Formation	China	A member of the family Bellerophontidae. Genus includes new species Q. qilianensis.	
Ransoniella gracilirostris	Sp. nov	Valid	Lorenz	Neogene		Indonesia	A member of the family Cypraeidae.	
"Retilaskeya" pulchra	Sp. nov	Valid	Harzhauser & Landau	Miocene	Dej Formation	Romania	A member of the family Newtoniellidae.	
Retusa mystica	Sp. nov	Valid	Harzhauser, Landau & Malaquias	Miocene	Dej Formation	Austria; Hungary; Romania; Slovakia	A species of Retusa.	
Rhaphisotostoma	Gen. et sp. nov	Valid	Páll-Gergely & Neubauer in Páll-Gergely et al.	Late Cretaceous (Santonian)	Ajka Coal Formation	Hungary	Genus includes new species R. asztalosi.	
Rhinoclavis parvisulcatus	Sp. nov	Valid	Merle	Late Cretaceous (Maastrichtian)		France		
Rhombopsis grenieri	Sp. nov	Valid	Chaix & Grenier	Late Cretaceous (Campanian)		France		
Rhombopsis vergonzanneae	Sp. nov	Valid	Chaix & Grenier	Late Cretaceous (Campanian)		France		
Rictaxis austriacus	Sp. nov	Valid	Harzhauser, Landau & Malaquias	Miocene	Grund Formation	Austria	A species of Rictaxis.	
Rictaxis siedli	Sp. nov	Valid	Harzhauser, Landau & Malaquias	Miocene	Baden Formation	Austria	A species of Rictaxis.	
Rictaxis ursulae	Sp. nov	Valid	Harzhauser, Landau & Malaquias	Miocene	Grund Formation	Austria	A species of Rictaxis.	
Ringicula daisyae	Sp. nov	Valid	Harzhauser, Landau & Malaquias	Miocene	Dej Formation	Romania	A species of Ringicula.	
Roxania bomba	Nom. nov	Valid	Harzhauser, Landau & Malaquias	Miocene		Austria	A species of Roxania; a replacement name for Sabatia callifera helvetica Berger (1949).	
Roxania minuscula	Sp. nov		Landau et al.	Miocene		Ukraine		
Roxania oviformis	Sp. nov	Valid	Harzhauser, Landau & Malaquias	Miocene	Baden Formation	Austria	A species of Roxania.	
Roxania pila	Sp. nov	Valid	Harzhauser, Landau & Malaquias	Miocene	Dej Formation	Romania	A species of Roxania.	
Sabatia quasimodoi	Sp. nov	Valid	Harzhauser, Landau & Malaquias	Miocene		Czech Republic	A species of Sabatia.	
Scalptia ondrejickovae	Sp. nov	Valid	Biskupič	Miocene (Serravallian)	Stupava Formation	Slovakia		
Scaphander alatissimus	Sp. nov	Valid	Harzhauser, Landau & Malaquias	Miocene	Grund Formation	Austria	A species of Scaphander.	
Scaphander catena	Sp. nov	Valid	Harzhauser, Landau & Malaquias	Miocene	Dej Formation	Bosnia and Herzegovina? Romania	A species of Scaphander.	
Scaphander krijgsmani	Sp. nov	Valid	Harzhauser, Landau & Malaquias	Miocene	Dej Formation	Romania	A species of Scaphander.	
Scaphander perforatus	Sp. nov	Valid	Harzhauser, Landau & Malaquias	Miocene	Baden Formation	Austria; Czech Republic	A species of Scaphander.	
Scaphander schollnbergeri	Sp. nov	Valid	Harzhauser, Landau & Malaquias	Miocene		Czech Republic; Hungary?	A species of Scaphander.	
Schuettemmericia prysiazhniuki	Sp. nov		Landau et al.	Miocene		Ukraine		
Scutellastra kadotai	Sp. nov	Valid	Hashimoto & Kase in Hashimoto et al.	Miocene	Makinoko Limestone	Japan	A member of the family Patellidae.	
Simnia akersae	Sp. nov	Valid	Dolin & Garvie	Eocene	Cook Mountain Formation	United States (Texas)	A member of the family Ovulidae belonging to the subfamily Simniinae.	
Sinaxila babosicoensis	Sp. nov	Valid	Landau & Monsecour	Pliocene		Dominican Republic		
Sparnollonia	Gen. et sp. nov	Valid	Merle	Late Cretaceous (Maastrichtian)		France	A member of the family Colloniidae. The type species is S. bicarinata.	
Sphaerocypraea extensa	Sp. nov	Valid	Zamberlan & Lovato	Eocene		Italy	A species of Sphaerocypraea.	
Sphaerovula	Gen. et 2 sp. nov	Valid	Dolin & Garvie	Eocene	Cook Mountain Formation	United States (Texas)	A member of the family Ovulidae belonging to the subfamily Sulcocypraeinae. The type species is S. ericksoni; genus also includes S. stenzeli.	
Staphylaea incisa	Sp. nov	Valid	Lorenz	Neogene		Indonesia	A member of the family Cypraeidae.	
Steironepion gabbi	Sp. nov	Valid	Landau & Monsecour	Miocene		Dominican Republic		
Steironepion heitzi	Sp. nov	Valid	Landau & Monsecour	Miocene		Dominican Republic		
Strobiligera cecalupoi	Sp. nov	Valid	Harzhauser & Landau	Miocene		Czech Republic		
Strobiligera sabellii	Sp. nov	Valid	Harzhauser & Landau	Miocene	Dej Formation	Romania		
Styliferina jansseni	Sp. nov		Landau et al.	Miocene		Ukraine		
Subepona burlesonensis	Sp. nov	Valid	Dolin & Garvie	Eocene	Weches Formation	United States (Texas)	A member of the family Cypraeidae belonging to the subfamily Erosariinae.	
Sulcoturbonilla oizys	Sp. nov	Valid	Harzhauser, Micali & Landau	Miocene		Romania		
Sveltella binkhorsti	Sp. nov	Valid	Merle	Late Cretaceous (Maastrichtian)		France		
Synthopsis pachygaster	Sp. nov	Valid	Harzhauser & Landau	Miocene	Dej Formation	Romania		
Syrnola aoniformoides	Sp. nov		Landau et al.	Miocene		Ukraine		
Talostolida dactylus	Sp. nov	Valid	Lorenz	Neogene		Indonesia	A member of the family Cypraeidae.	
Tangarilda darestei	Sp. nov	Valid	Monari et al.	Early Jurassic (Hettangian)	Luxembourg Sandstone	Luxembourg	A member of the family Mathildidae.	
Tchangmargarya ashimaae	Sp. nov	Valid	Xiang, Wang, He & Chen in Xiang et al.	Quaternary	Ciying Formation	China	A member of the family Viviparidae.	
Tchangmargarya buhou	Sp. nov	Valid	Xiang, Wang, He & Chen in Xiang et al.	Neogene	Ciying Formation	China	A member of the family Viviparidae.	
Tchangmargarya cunshan	Sp. nov	Valid	Xiang, Wang, He & Lv in Xiang et al.	Quaternary	Ciying Formation	China	A member of the family Viviparidae.	
Tchangmargarya laojin	Sp. nov	Valid	Xiang, Wang, He & Chen in Xiang et al.	Neogene	Ciying Formation	China	A member of the family Viviparidae.	
Tchangmargarya liyoufui	Sp. nov	Valid	Xiang, Wang, He & Chen in Xiang et al.	Quaternary	Ciying Formation	China	A member of the family Viviparidae.	
Tchangmargarya luyizhii	Sp. nov	Valid	Xiang, Wang, He & Chen in Xiang et al.	Quaternary	Ciying Formation	China	A member of the family Viviparidae.	
Tchangmargarya mohou	Sp. nov	Valid	Xiang, Wang, He & Chen in Xiang et al.	Neogene	Ciying Formation	China	A member of the family Viviparidae.	
Tchangmargarya sparkleae	Sp. nov	Valid	Xiang, Wang, He & Chen in Xiang et al.	Quaternary	Ciying Formation	China	A member of the family Viviparidae.	
Tchangmargarya yangjizhoui	Sp. nov	Valid	Xiang, Wang, He & Chen in Xiang et al.	Neogene	Ciying Formation	China	A member of the family Viviparidae.	
Tchangmargarya yumi	Sp. nov	Valid	Xiang, Zha, He & Chen in Xiang et al.	Quaternary	Ciying Formation	China	A member of the family Viviparidae.	
Tchangmargarya zhangxianmingi	Sp. nov	Valid	Xiang, Zha, He & Chen in Xiang et al.	Neogene	Ciying Formation	China	A member of the family Viviparidae.	
?Tectus acmantensis	Sp. nov	Valid	Merle	Late Cretaceous (Maastrichtian)		France		
?Tectus boisdroni	Sp. nov	Valid	Chaix & Grenier	Late Cretaceous (Campanian)		France		
?Tectus fraterculus	Sp. nov	Valid	Merle	Late Cretaceous (Maastrichtian)		France		
?Tectus senarmonti	Sp. nov	Valid	Merle	Late Cretaceous (Maastrichtian)		France		
Trabecula terpsichore	Sp. nov	Valid	Harzhauser, Micali & Landau	Miocene		Romania		
Traceya	Gen. et sp. nov	Valid	Dolin & Garvie	Eocene	Cook Mountain Formation	United States (Texas)	A member of the family Ovulidae belonging to the subfamily Cypraediinae. The type species is T. zyzania.	
Tragula euphrosyne	Sp. nov	Valid	Harzhauser, Micali & Landau	Miocene		Romania		
Tragula micalii	Sp. nov		Landau et al.	Miocene		Ukraine		
Transovula parvabrazensis	Sp. nov	Valid	Dolin & Garvie	Eocene	Cook Mountain Formation	United States (Texas)	A member of the family Ovulidae belonging to the subfamily Eocypraeinae.	
Triphora (s. lato) fabresa	Nom. nov	Valid	Masse et al.	Eocene (Ypresian)		France	A member of the family Triphoridae; a replacement name for Triforis (Epetrium) longissimus Doncieux (1908).	
Tritia dubikovskae	Sp. nov		Landau et al.	Miocene		Ukraine		
Tubbreva paratethyca	Sp. nov		Landau et al.	Miocene		Ukraine		
Turbonilla alkmene	Sp. nov	Valid	Harzhauser, Micali & Landau	Miocene		Austria		
Turbonilla anaxo	Sp. nov	Valid	Harzhauser, Micali & Landau	Miocene		Austria		
Turbonilla andromeda	Sp. nov	Valid	Harzhauser, Micali & Landau	Miocene		Austria		
Turbonilla chariklo	Sp. nov	Valid	Harzhauser, Micali & Landau	Miocene		Austria		
Turbonilla cymadoce	Sp. nov	Valid	Harzhauser, Micali & Landau	Miocene		Romania		
Turbonilla deiopea	Sp. nov	Valid	Harzhauser, Micali & Landau	Miocene		Romania		
Turbonilla echo	Sp. nov	Valid	Harzhauser, Micali & Landau	Miocene		Austria		
Turbonilla galaxaule	Sp. nov	Valid	Harzhauser, Micali & Landau	Miocene		Romania		
Turbonilla harmonia	Sp. nov	Valid	Harzhauser, Micali & Landau	Miocene		Romania		
Turbonilla kalypso	Sp. nov	Valid	Harzhauser, Micali & Landau	Miocene		Czech Republic		
Turbonilla koryphe	Sp. nov	Valid	Harzhauser, Micali & Landau	Miocene		Austria		
Turbonilla lilaia	Sp. nov	Valid	Harzhauser, Micali & Landau	Miocene		Austria		
Turbonilla ozomene	Sp. nov	Valid	Harzhauser, Micali & Landau	Miocene		Austria		
Turbonilla pherusa	Sp. nov	Valid	Harzhauser, Micali & Landau	Miocene		Austria		
Turbonilla ptelea	Sp. nov	Valid	Harzhauser, Micali & Landau	Miocene		Romania		
Turritella vindinonensis	Nom. nov	Valid	Pacaud in Coan et al.	Late Cretaceous (Cenomanian)		France	A replacement name for Turritella ornata d'Orbigny (1843).	
Turritelloidea? bockfielsensis	Sp. nov	Valid	Monari et al.	Early Jurassic (Hettangian)	Luxembourg Sandstone	Luxembourg	A member of the family Gordenellidae.	
Unitas stipii	Sp. nov	Valid	Kovács et al.	Eocene		Hungary		
Unitas vargai	Sp. nov	Valid	Kovács et al.	Eocene		Hungary		
Vermetus jyllandensis	Sp. nov	Valid	Kočí et al.	Oligocene	Brejning Formation	Denmark	A species of Vermetus.	
?Vicinocerithium heberti	Sp. nov	Valid	Merle	Late Cretaceous (Maastrichtian)		France		
Volutilithes gujaratensis	Sp. nov		Saha, Das & Mondal	Late Jurassic		India		
Wadeina	Gen. et comb. nov	Valid	Bakayeva et al.	Late Cretaceous (Campanian)	Coon Creek Formation	United States (Mississippi; Tennessee)	A member of the family Personidae. The type species is "Colombellina" americana Wade (1926).	
Xandarovula praecursor	Sp. nov	Valid	Dolin & Garvie	Eocene	Weches Formation	United States (Texas)	A member of the family Ovulidae belonging to the subfamily Eocypraeinae.	
Zanassarina jungi	Sp. nov	Valid	Landau & Monsecour	Miocene		Dominican Republic		
Zikkuratia saqqaqana	Sp. nov	Valid	Pacaud	Paleocene	Agatdal Formation	Greenland	A member of the family Retusidae.	
Zitaia	Gen. et sp. nov	Valid	Kovács et al.	Eocene		Hungary	Genus includes new species Z. szilviae.	

=== Gastropod research ===
- Evidence of a southward expansion of nerineoid gastropods from the Boreal Realm into the Tethyan Realm during the Jurassic period is presented by Leshno Afriat, Rabinovich & Edelman-Furstenberg (2026).
- Li, Xiao & Yu (2026) report the discovery of new fossil material of Coptocheilus electrothauma (originally named Schistoloma electrothauma) from the Cretaceous amber from Myanmar, and revise the diagnostic traits of this species.
- The first known fossils of members of extant species Lanayrella vagabunda are reported from the Miocene strata of the Monte León Formation (Argentina) by Di Luca & Pastorino (2026).
- Botka & Magyar (2026) revise the late Miocene lymnaeid assemblage from the Lake Pannon in Central Europe, identifying 11 species within five genera.
- Evidence from the study of viviparid fossils from the Kitadani Formation (Japan) indicative of presence of key life-history traits of extant viviparids in Early Cretaceous members of the group is presented by Yoshimura et al. (2026).
- Systematic revision of Neogastropoda, including a review of their fossil record, is published by Fedosov et al. (2026).
- Merle & Pacaud (2026) classify "Murex" subfusifomis as a member of the genus Pseudotrophonopsis.
- Evidence of impact of preservational biases on biodiversity patterns of Cretaceous and Paleogene gastropods estimated from their fossil record is presented by Crestohl & Bush (2026).
- Osipova & Lin (2026) study the composition of the assemblage of pelagic gastropods from the Pleistocene strata of the Szekou Formation (Taiwan), and find no evidence of significant spatial and temporal separation of Pleistocene holoplanktonic gastropod assemblages from different parts of the Indo–West Pacific region.

== Other molluscs ==
Name	Novelty	Status	Authors	Age	Type locality	Location	Notes	Images
Biyiella	Gen. et sp. nov	Valid	Gao et al.	Cambrian (Fortunian)	Kuanchuanpu Formation	China	A member of the family Maikhanellidae. The type species is B. hanzhongensis.	
Cadulus scarabinorum	Sp. nov	Valid	Roco-Villablanca, Rivadeneira & Nielsen	Miocene	Lacui Formation	Chile	A tusk shell, a species of Cadulus.	
Craspedochiton sciutoi	Sp. nov	Valid	Dell'Angelo et al.	Pliocene		Italy	A chiton, a species of Craspedochiton.	
Dischides nor	Sp. nov	Valid	Roco-Villablanca, Rivadeneira & Nielsen	Miocene	Lacui Formation	Chile	A tusk shell, a species of Dischides.	
Eremusella	Gen. et sp. nov		Xu & Steiner	Cambrian Stage 3	Daagandel Formation	Mongolia	A member of the family Khairkhaniidae. Genus includes new species E. subevoluta.	
Fissidentalium taverai	Sp. nov	Valid	Roco-Villablanca, Rivadeneira & Nielsen	Miocene	Lacui Formation	Chile	A tusk shell, a species of Fissidentalium.	
"Lepidochitona" hyblaea	Sp. nov	Valid	Dell'Angelo et al.	Pliocene		Italy	A chiton belonging to the family Tonicellidae.	
Mokshatuba	Gen. et sp. nov	Valid	Mazaev	Carboniferous		Russia	A member of Rostroconchia belonging to the family Pseudobigaleaidae. Genus includes new species M. okaensis.	
Polyschides pichi	Sp. nov	Valid	Roco-Villablanca, Rivadeneira & Nielsen	Miocene	Lacui Formation	Chile	A tusk shell, a species of Polyschides.	
Prosinuites dazhuangensis	Sp. nov		Gong et al.	Cambrian	Xinji Formation	China	A helcionellid.	

=== Other molluscan research ===
- Hou et al. (2026) provide new information on the sclerite ultrastructure of Cambrian maikhanellids from the Kuanchuanpu Formation (China), and interpret maikhanellids as a distinct clade in the stem group of Mollusca.
- A study on the microstructure of shells of Bemella simplex, Latouchella korobkovi and Merismoconcha tommotica from the Cambrian Bayangol Formation (Mongolia), providing evidence of occurrence of a bidirectional foliated aragonite microstructure, is published by Xia & Li (2026).

== General research ==
- Evidence from the study of the molluscan fossil record, indicative of higher frequency of origination of unique and first occurrences of repeated phenotypes during the first 96 million years of the evolutionary history of the group (in the Cambrian and Ordovician) than during the remaining 444 million years of their history, is presented by Vermeij & Thomson (2026).
- Reynolds et al. (2026) provide new carbonate clumped isotope data from belemnite and bivalve fossils from the Sundance Formation, interpreted as indicative of elevated sea-surface temperatures in the Sundance Sea compared to the open ocean during the Oxfordian, reaching temperatures similar to those of warmest modern tropical seas, a.
- Cataldo et al. (2026) study biogeographic affinities of marine benthic assemblages of bivalves and gastropods from the Maastrichtian strata from Argentinian Patagonia, identifying two distinct biogeographic units and reporting evidence of weak affinities with coeval assemblages from central Chile and Antarctic Peninsula.
- A study on the fossil record of bivalves and gastropods from the North American Pacific coast ranging from the Late Cretaceous to the Eocene, providing evidence of loss of morphological diversity after the Cretaceous–Paleogene extinction event and a recovery during the Paleocene, is published by Contreras-Figueroa, Hendy & Aragón (2026).
- Morales-Ortega & González-Barba (2026) study the impact climate and environmental changes on composition of Eocene molluscan assemblages from North and South America, reporting evidence of faunal exchanges between the Atlantic, Pacific and Caribbean Sea, and evidence indicating that peaks of molluscan biodiversity coincided with hyperthermal events.
- Bellosi et al. (2026) revise the age and distribution of the molluscan assemblages from Patagonia living at the time of the Chattian-Langhian marine incursions into southern South America, and provide calibrated dating of the youngest fauna dominated by tropical species.
- A study on the fossil record of late Neogene bivalves and gastropods from the Atlantic coast of North America, providing evidence of links between basal metabolic rates and extinction patterns of the studied molluscs, is published by Rojas-Ariza, Strotz & Lieberman (2026).
- Evidence from the study of the fossil record of molluscs from the East Pisco Basin on the Peruvian continental margin ranging from the late Miocene to the present, indicative of a major faunal shift between 6 and 4 million years ago, is presented by Medina-Franco et al. (2026).
- DeVries (2026) studies the composition of late Pliocene and Pleistocene marine molluscan assemblages from northwestern Peru, and reports evidence of a shift from a cool-water to warm-water fauna during the Pleistocene that might have been linked to uplift of the coastal plain and/or altered equatorial circulation.
- Danise et al. (2026) review the diversity and distribution of Mediterranean molluscs during the Last Interglacial.
- Schweigl et al. (2026) study the functional composition and diversity of Late Quaternary molluscan assemblages from the nearshore communities from the Adriatic Sea, and find evidence of differences of composition of the assemblage from the Last Glacial Period compared to assemblages from both the Last Interglacial and the Holocene.
- Betz et al. (2026) evaluate functional traits of Pliocene-Holocene bivalves and gastropods from the West Atlantic, finding no evidence of a significant association of the studied traits with increased extinction risk of the studied molluscs.
- Kiel (2026) reports evidence from the study of extant and extinct molluscs from cold seep environments indicative of a dip of diversity of the studied mollucs from 200 to 1000 m depth in subtropical regions that persisted at least since Oligocene, interpreted as likely linked to presence of oxygen minimum zones.
- Neubauer (2026) applies two statistical methods used to determine species richness on the basis of description rates to the fossil record of non-marine molluscs, European freshwater gastropods and Mesozoic–Cenozoic scallops, reports evidence of impact of incompleteness of datasets on results of analyses, and argues that decelerating description rates might not be a conclusive evidence of the fossil record reaching completeness.
