= Requienia =

Requienia is the scientific name of two genera of organisms and may refer to:

- Requienia (bivalve), a genus of fossil molluscs in the family Requieniidae
- Requienia (plant), a genus of plants in the family Fabaceae
