= Eoceras =

Eoceras Temporal range: Early Cambrian (Series 2, Stage 3)

Scientific classification
- Kingdom: Animalia
- Phylum: Mollusca
- Class: Cephalopoda
- Order: incertae sedis
- Family: incertae sedis
- Genus: †Eoceras; Song & Guo in Song et al., 2026
- Species: †E. shaanxiense

Binomial name
- †Eoceras shaanxiense Song & Guo in Song et al., 2026

Genus of extinct cephalopod

Eoceras (lit. 'dawn horn') is an extinct genus of ancient cephalopod mollusc known from the Cambrian Stage 3 Shuijingtuo Formation of China. The genus contains a single species, Eoceras shaanxiense, known from 32 shells. Eoceras is recognized as the earliest known fossil cephalopod, extending the fossil record from the previous oldest taxon, Plectronoceras, which is known from the end of the Cambrian period.

The shells of Eoceras are only a millimetre long and have a blunt conical shape. They have wide, segmented siphuncles on the ventral (bottom) half of the shell.

== Discovery and naming ==
The Eoceras fossil material was discovered in the phosphatic limestone outcrops of the lower Shuijingtuo Formation. This site is located near Liaoyeba village in Shaanxi Province, China, and can be assigned to the Eoredlichia–Wutingaspis Biozone. The specimens—comprising 32 three-dimensionally preserved shells of varying completeness—are housed in the palaeontological collections of Chang'an University (CU), where they are permanently accessioned under separate numbers.

In 2026, Zuchen Song and colleagues described Eoceras shaanxiense as a new genus and species of early cephalopod based on these fossil remains, establishing specimen CUBar297-1 as the holotype specimen. They also formally recognized seven paratype specimens. The remaining 24 specimens include the broken ventral portions of five phragmocones, eight isolated siphuncles, seven broken shells, and four isolated septa. The generic name, Eoceras, combines the Greek suffix eo-, meaning 'dawn', with the Greek ceras, meaning 'horn', alluding to the recognition of this siphuncle-bearing taxon at the 'dawn' of cephalopod evolution. The specific name, shaanxiense, references the discovery of this species in Shaanxi Province.

== Phylogeny ==
Cladogram from Song et al. 2026, showing the position of Eoceras as the basalmost stem-cephalopod. The traditional mollusc clades Aculifera and Conchifera were recovered by the study in a polytomy with the hyoliths, traditionally considered non-molluscan lophophorates.

- Mollusca (total group)
  - Conchifera
    - - - - Scaphopoda
          - Bivalvia
        - Gastropoda
      - Cephalopoda (total group)
        - ? "Orthoconic camerate taxa" (e.g. †Tannuella)
        - - †Eoceras
          - - †Plectronocerida
            - - †Yanhecerida
              - - †Ellesmeroceratoidea
                - - - †Endoceratoidea
                    - †Multiceratoidea
                  - - †Orthoceratoidea
                    - Cephalopoda (crown group)
                      - Nautilidea
                      - Coleoidea
    - Monoplacophora
  - Aculifera
  - †Hyolitha
