= Eoconus sauridens =

Scientific classification
- Kingdom: Animalia
- Phylum: Mollusca
- Class: Gastropoda
- Subclass: Caenogastropoda
- Order: Neogastropoda
- Superfamily: Conoidea
- Family: Conidae
- Genus: †Eoconus
- Species: †E. sauridens

Binomial name
- †Eoconus sauridens (Conrad, 1833)

Synonyms
- † Conus alveatus T. A. Conrad, 1865; † Conus claibornensis Lea, 1833; † Conus cracens R. C. Hoerle, 1976; † Conus jacksonensis Meyer, 1885; † Conus nocens Garve, 1996; † Conus parvus Lea, 1841; † Conus sauridens Conrad, 1833 (original combination); † Conus subsauridens T. A. Conrad, 1865; † Conus tortilis T. A. Conrad, 1854; † Conus sauridens Conrad, 1833; † Leptoconus santander Gardner, 1945

Extinct species of gastropod

Eoconus sauridens is an extinct species of sea snail, a marine gastropod mollusk, in the family Conidae.

It has one subspecies: † Conus sauridens chiraensis A. A. Olsson, 1930

== Description ==
The shell of Eoconus sauridens can reach up to 65 mm.

== Distribution ==
Fossils of this species were found in Southern USA.
