= Eoconus sulciferus =

Scientific classification
- Kingdom: Animalia
- Phylum: Mollusca
- Class: Gastropoda
- Subclass: Caenogastropoda
- Order: Neogastropoda
- Superfamily: Conoidea
- Family: Conidae
- Genus: †Eoconus
- Species: †E. sulciferus

Binomial name
- †Eoconus sulciferus (Deshayes, 1835)

Synonyms
- † Conus sulciferus Deshayes, 1835

Extinct species of gastropod

Eoconus sulciferus is an extinct species of sea snail, a marine gastropod mollusk, in the family Conidae.

== Description ==
The length of the shell attains 63 mm.

== Distribution ==
Fossils of this species were found in Eocene strata in the Paris Basin, France.
