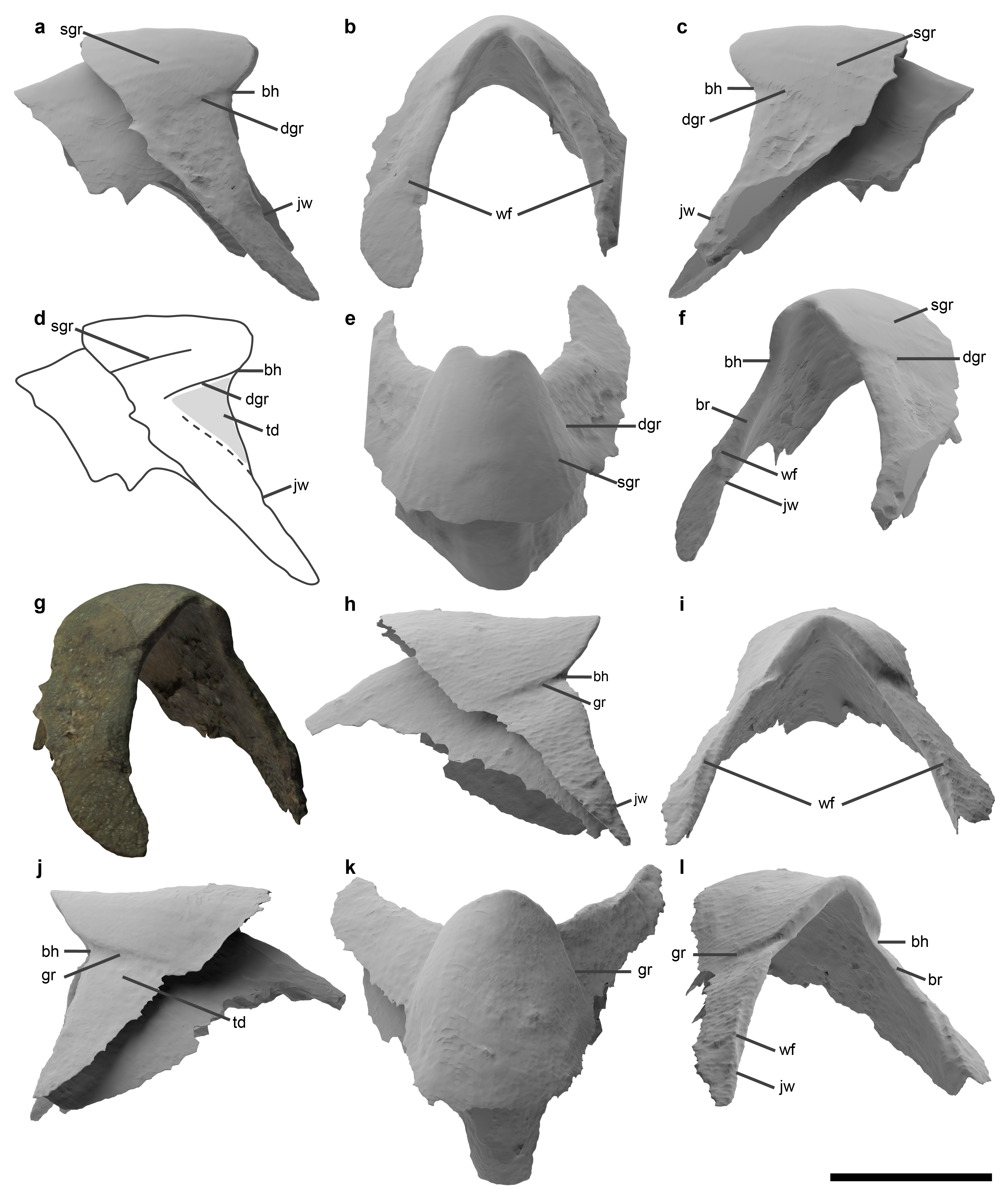
- Lower beaks of Uluciala rotundata

Scientific classification
- Kingdom: Animalia
- Phylum: Mollusca
- Class: Cephalopoda
- Superorder: Decapodiformes
- Order: incertae sedis
- Genus: †Uluciala; Sugiura et al., 2026
- Species: †U. rotundata

Binomial name
- †Uluciala rotundata Sugiura et al., 2026

= Uluciala =

Uluciala Temporal range: Late Cretaceous (Campanian–Maastrichtian), ~74–67 Ma

Genus of extinct cephalopods

Uluciala (lit. 'owl wing') is an extinct genus of decabrachian (squid relative) cephalopod mollusc known from Late Cretaceous Pierre Shale and Fox Hill Formation of South Dakota, United States. The genus contains a single species, Uluciala rotundata, named based on two lower beaks. These show a morphology intermediate between Sepiida (cuttlefish) and Sepiolida (bobtail squid), indicating Uluciala is closely related to these clades. These remains were discovered using "digital fossil-mining" techniques that incorporated a zero-shot learning AI model, representing the first application of this technology in both paleontological research and full-color tomographic data.

== Discovery and naming ==
Digital fossil-mining and AI-segmenting process for a U. rotundata specimen

The Uluciala fossil material, comprising two lower beaks, was preserved in carbonate concretions collected in outcrops representing deposits of the Western Interior Seaway in South Dakota, United States. One beak-bearing concretion was found in the upper part of the Pierre Shale (AMNH loc. 3274) in Meade County. This locality has been assigned to the Baculites compressus/cuneatus ammonite Zone, dating it to the late Campanian age (~74 million years ago) via biostratigraphy. The second concretion was found in the Timber Lake Member of the Fox Hill Formation (AMNH loc. 3272) in Dewey County. This locality has been assigned to the Hoploscaphites nebrascensis ammonite Zone, dating it to the late Maastrichtian (~67 million years ago).

To study the contents of these carbonate concretions, researchers began by cutting them into appropriately-sized blocks and conducting grinding tomography. This is a destructive imaging technique in which the block is slowly ground down in slices (increments of 50 μm (0.050 mm) or 25 μm (0.025 mm) used for these specimens), with high-resolution photographs taken of the block after each 'slice'. The images can then be digitally stacked, allowing the full structure of the specimen(s) to be viewed at any layer in cross-section. To allow efficient segmentation of the sectional data, the researchers applied DEVA (decoupled video segmentation approach) technology, an artificial intelligence-powered tool developed for recognizing and tracking objects between video frames. For this study, a zero-shot learning AI was used, which was pre-trained via DEVA on generalized mask data, but not on tomography- or fossil-specific data. As such, it can segment any object in the data, even if it has not been trained on it. Once the tomography slices have been segmented, a 3D model can be produced, allowing for full visualization of objects previously embedded in stone. The research by Sugiura and colleagues on these squid beaks is the first time zero-shot learning AI and DEVA technology have been applied to either colored tomographic data or paleontology research.

In 2026, Kanta Sugiura and colleagues described Uluciala rotundata as a new genus and species of cuttlefish-like decabrachian based on the digital models extracted from the tomography data. Since the original carbonate concretions—and the fossils contained therein—were destroyed to produce this data, the researchers treated these models as the known 'specimens', referred to as NMNS_DS00254_0k5cvkE.stl and NMNS_DS00285_ma2jp6.stl. These files are deposited in both the National Museum of Nature and Science (NMNS) in Tokyo, Japan, and the American Museum of Natural History (AMNH) in New York, United States. The generic name, Uluciala, combines the Latin words ulucus, meaning 'owl', and ala, meaning 'wing', in reference to the superficial similarity in form of the animal's beak with the wings of an owl. The specific name, rotundata, is a Latin word meaning 'rounded', alluding to the shape of the rostrum.

== Description and classification ==
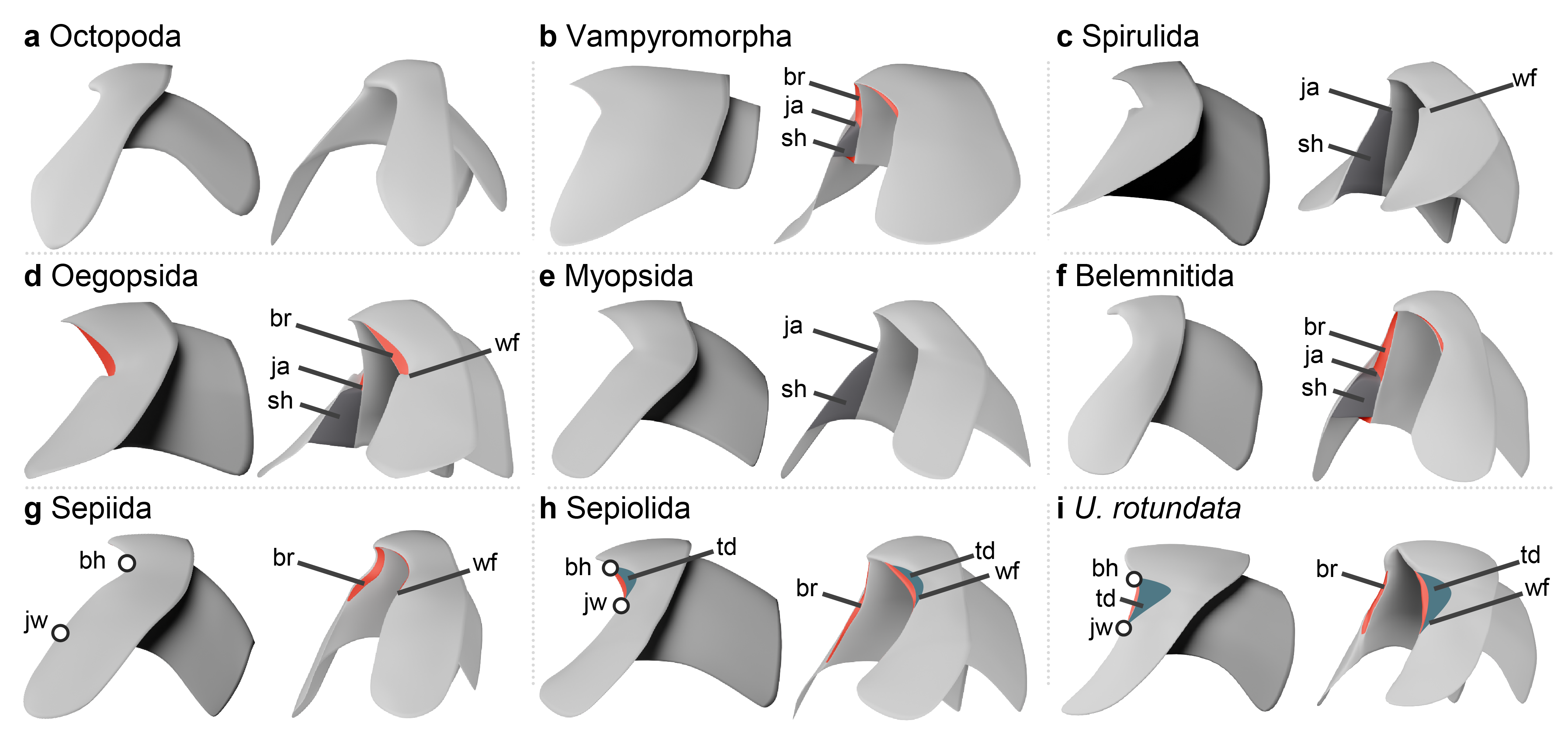
Comparison of the lower beak in various lineages of the Coleoidea

Uluciala is recognized as a 'sepioid', which is the name applied to the group including the clades Sepiida (cuttlefish) and Sepiolida (bobtail squid). As such, it is more closely related to these taxa than to nautiluses, octopuses, and other squid. Furthermore, Uluciala is the oldest known member of this lineage. The rostral tip of th beak of Uluciala forms a large, rounded hook.
