= Monopleura =

Monopleura Temporal range: Cretaceous

Scientific classification
- Domain: Eukaryota
- Kingdom: Animalia
- Phylum: Mollusca
- Class: Bivalvia
- Order: †Hippuritida
- Family: †Monopleuridae
- Genus: †Monopleura; Matheron, 1842

Type species
- †Monopleura varians Matheron, 1842 (type by subsequent designation)

Species
- †Monopleura aliena (Počta, 1889); †Monopleura cumulus Počta, 1889; †Monopleura michaillensis Pictet & Campiche, 1868; †Monopleura taurica Pchelintsev, 1959

Extinct genus of bivalves

Monopleura is a genus of saltwater clams, marine bivalve mollusks in the family Monopleuridae. These fossils have been dated back to the Cretaceous Period (145.5 million to 66 million years ago).

These bivalves are known as pachyodonts.

== Description ==
The thick triangular shell in this genus is capped by a smaller dome-shaped shell. Some of the pachyodonts possessed open passageways through the shell that allowed for fluids to pass. These pachyodont bivalves were habitually sedentary and grew upright with the pointed end anchored in the substrate.
