= Eoconus bareti =

Scientific classification
- Kingdom: Animalia
- Phylum: Mollusca
- Class: Gastropoda
- Subclass: Caenogastropoda
- Order: Neogastropoda
- Superfamily: Conoidea
- Family: Conidae
- Genus: †Eoconus
- Species: †E. bareti

Binomial name
- †Eoconus bareti (Vasseur, 1882)

Synonyms
- † Conus bareti Vasseur, 1882

Extinct species of gastropod

Eoconus bareti is an extinct species of sea snail, a marine gastropod mollusk, in the family Conidae.

== Description ==
The length of the shell attains 35 mm.

== Distribution ==
Fossils of this species were found in Brittany, France.
