= Eoconus diversiformis =

Scientific classification
- Kingdom: Animalia
- Phylum: Mollusca
- Class: Gastropoda
- Subclass: Caenogastropoda
- Order: Neogastropoda
- Superfamily: Conoidea
- Family: Conidae
- Genus: †Eoconus
- Species: †E. diversiformis

Binomial name
- †Eoconus diversiformis (Deshayes, 1835)

Synonyms
- †Conus diversiformis Deshayes, 1835

Extinct species of gastropod

Eoconus diversiformis is an extinct species of sea snail, a marine gastropod mollusk, in the family Conidae.

== Description ==
The length of the shell attains 42 mm.

== Distribution ==
Fossils of this species were found in the Paris Basin, France.
