= Metaconulus heres =

Scientific classification
- Kingdom: Animalia
- Phylum: Mollusca
- Class: Gastropoda
- Subclass: Vetigastropoda
- Order: Trochida
- Superfamily: Trochoidea
- Family: Calliostomatidae
- Genus: †Metaconulus
- Species: †M. heres

Binomial name
- †Metaconulus heres (Deshayes, 1863)

Synonyms
- Metaconulus buchozi LeRenard, 1994; Metaconulus princeps (Deshayes, 1863); Trochus heres Deshayes, 1863; Trochus princeps Deshayes, 1863

Extinct species of gastropod

Metaconulus heres is an extinct species of sea snail, a marine gastropod mollusk, in the family Calliostomatidae within the superfamily Trochoidea, the top snails, turban snails and their allies.
