= Monopleuridae =

Scientific classification
- Kingdom: Animalia
- Phylum: Mollusca
- Class: Bivalvia
- Order: †Hippuritida
- Superfamily: †Radiolitoidea
- Family: †Monopleuridae

Genera
- See text

Family of extinct bivalves

Monopleuridae is a family of bivalves that belongs to the order Hippuritida (rudists). Some genera such as Monopleura are known to have a global distribution with a wide temporal range from the Tithonian age of the Jurassic period to the Maastrichtian age of the Cretaceous period.

Members of the family are characterized by their myophoral plates projecting from the free valve and into the attached valve.

Unlike members of the family Requieniidae who play a major role in “rudist formations”, Monopleurids tended to play a limited physiognomic role in early Cretaceous shallow water carbonate platforms located in the Mediterranean region. Members of the family were locally abundant and during the ages from the early Valanginian to the late Aptian–Albian, they had significant constructional potential. The family experienced drastic levels of extinction during the Aptian Extinction (Mid-Aptian crisis) of the early Cretaceous period. During the Aptian extinction, many rudist bivalves became extinct with more than 90% of the rudist species from the Mediterranean and 70% of the genera going extinct. These rates of extinction were mostly from the families Requieniidae and Monopleuridae.

== Taxonomy ==
The family was described in 1873 by Ernest Munier-Chalmas, a French geologist who is known for his contributions to the study of the Cretaceous period. Monopleura is the representative genus of the family. It was the second clade identified within the suborder Hippuritidina. Monopleura is the representative genus of the family.

Monopleura is also considered as the root of family being the oldest member. It is potentially ancestor of primitive representatives of families such as Radiolitidae, Polyconitidae and Caprotinidae. Besides myophoral changes, the lineage from Monopleura to Homopleura seems to record similar size changes. The genus Homopleura may be the ancestor of the family Polyconitidae and may also be the root of the Caprinulidae.

=== Genera ===
- Bicornucopina Hoffman, 2012- taxonomic placement possibly uncertain
- Homopleura Masse & Fenerci-Masse
- Debrunia Masse & Fenerci-Masse, 2009
- Mathesia Mainelli, 1996
- Monopleura Matheron, 1843
- Petalodontia Pocta, 1889
- Pseudopetalodontia Masse et al. 2007

=== Previously assigned genera ===
- Agriopleura Kühn
