= Eoconus veteratoris =

Scientific classification
- Domain: Eukaryota
- Kingdom: Animalia
- Phylum: Mollusca
- Class: Gastropoda
- Subclass: Caenogastropoda
- Order: Neogastropoda
- Superfamily: Conoidea
- Family: Conidae
- Genus: †Eoconus
- Species: †E. veteratoris

Binomial name
- †Eoconus veteratoris Tracey & Craig, 2017

Extinct species of gastropod

Eoconus veteratoris is an extinct species of sea snail, a marine gastropod mollusk, in the family Conidae.

== Distribution ==
Fossils of this species were found in Eocene strata in the Paris basin, France.
