= Metaconulus mauliaensis =

Scientific classification
- Kingdom: Animalia
- Phylum: Mollusca
- Class: Gastropoda
- Subclass: Vetigastropoda
- Order: Trochida
- Superfamily: Trochoidea
- Family: Calliostomatidae
- Genus: †Metaconulus
- Species: †M. mauliaensis

Binomial name
- †Metaconulus mauliaensis Belliard & Gain, 2015

Extinct species of gastropod

Metaconulus mauliaensis is an extinct species of sea snail, a marine gastropod mollusk, in the family Calliostomatidae within the superfamily Trochoidea, the top snails, turban snails and their allies.
