= Eoconus derelictus =

Scientific classification
- Kingdom: Animalia
- Phylum: Mollusca
- Class: Gastropoda
- Subclass: Caenogastropoda
- Order: Neogastropoda
- Superfamily: Conoidea
- Family: Conidae
- Genus: †Eoconus
- Species: †E. derelictus

Binomial name
- †Eoconus derelictus (Deshayes, 1865)

Synonyms
- † Conus derelictus Deshayes, 1865; † Lithoconus derelictus G.P. Deshayes, 1866

Extinct species of gastropod

Eoconus derelictus is an extinct species of predatory sea snail, a marine gastropod mollusk in the family Conidae.

== Description ==
The length of the shell attains 55 mm.

== Distribution ==
Fossils of this species were found in Paris Basin, northwest France, and were dated back to the late Lutetian period.
