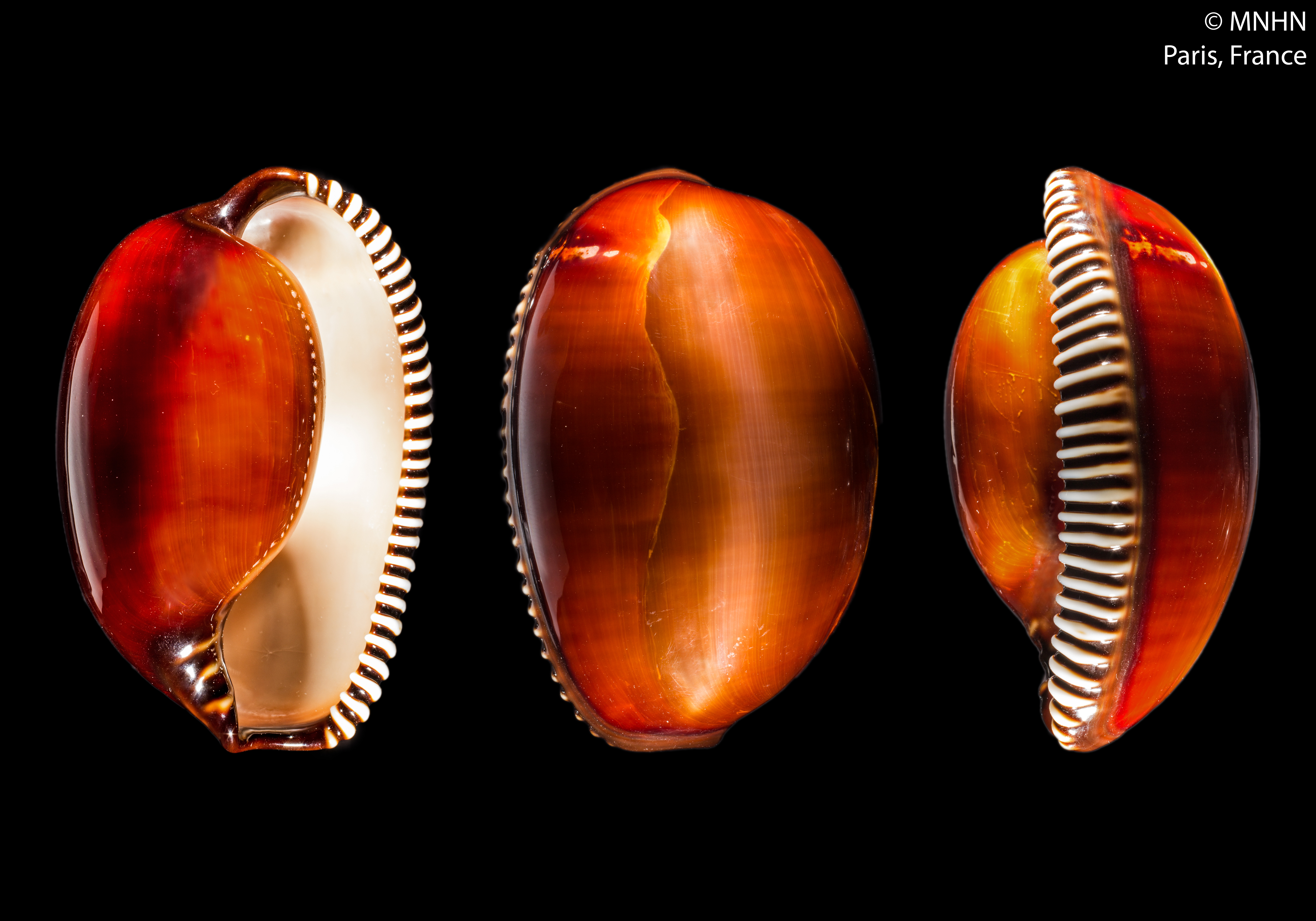
- Shell of Sphaerocypraea incomparabilis (holotype at MNHN, Paris)

Scientific classification
- Kingdom: Animalia
- Phylum: Mollusca
- Class: Gastropoda
- Subclass: Caenogastropoda
- Order: Littorinimorpha
- Superfamily: Cypraeoidea
- Family: Eocypraeidae
- Genus: Sphaerocypraea; F. A. Schilder, 1924

Type species
- † Cypraea bowerbankii Sowerby in Dixon, 1850

Synonyms
- Chimaeria Briano, 1993; Eocypraea (Sphaerocypraea) F. A. Schilder, 1927 (original combination); † Marginocypraea Ingram, 1947

= Sphaerocypraea =

Genus of gastropods

Sphaerocypraea is a genus of large sea snails, marine gastropod molluscs in the family Eocypraeidae, belonging to the cowries and cowry allies.

== Species ==
- † Sphaerocypraea bowerbankii (Sowerby in Dixon, 1850)
- † Sphaerocypraea bullaeformis (Tate, 1898)
- † Sphaerocypraea camboritus Pacaud, 2018
- † Sphaerocypraea gallica Pacaud, 2018
- Sphaerocypraea incomparabilis (Briano, 1993)
- † Sphaerocypraea jacksonensis (C. W. Johnson, 1899)
- † † Sphaerocypraea levesquei (Deshayes, 1835)
- Sphaerocypraea paraguana (Ingram, 1947)
- † Sphaerocypraea tessieri (Amard, Collignon & Roman, 1983)
