= Maikhanellidae =

Maikhanellidae Temporal range: Early Cambrian

Scientific classification
- Domain: Eukaryota
- Kingdom: Animalia
- Phylum: Mollusca
- Class: Monoplacophora
- Family: †Maikhanellidae

Extinct family of molluscs

The Maikhanellidae are a family of Early Cambrian monoplacophora with a limpet-like morphology.
