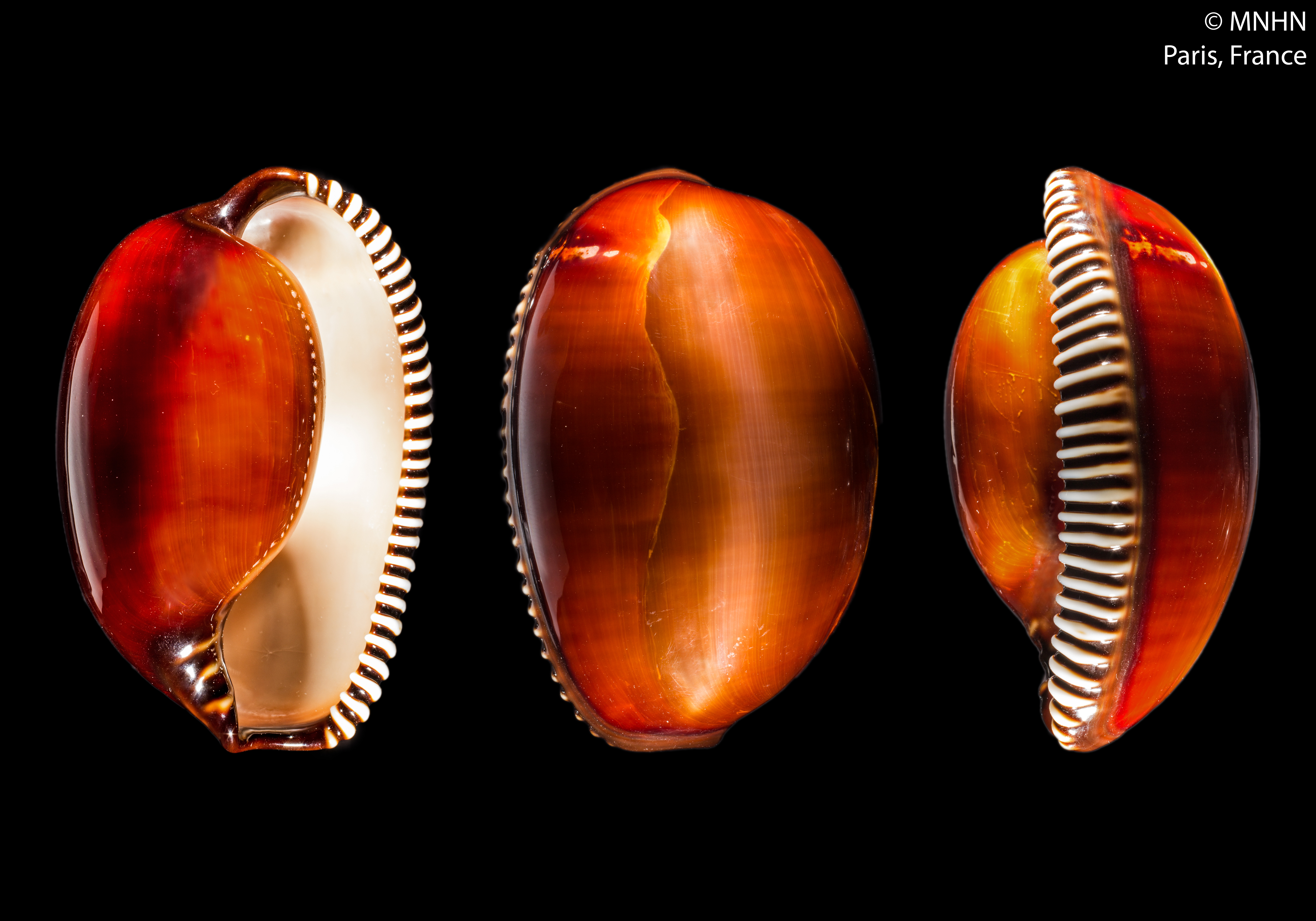
- Shell of Sphaerocypraea incomparabilis

Scientific classification
- Kingdom: Animalia
- Phylum: Mollusca
- Class: Gastropoda
- Subclass: Caenogastropoda
- Order: Littorinimorpha
- Superfamily: Cypraeoidea
- Family: Eocypraeidae; F. A. Schilder, 1924

Genera
- See text

= Eocypraeidae =

Family of gastropods

Eocypraeidae is a small family of large sea snails, marine gastropod molluscs in the superfamily Cypraeoidea, the cowries and cowry allies.

The family Eocypraeidae consists mainly of fossil species, except for two species: Sphaerocypraea incomparabilis Briano, 1993 (regarded as valid) and an as yet undescribed species found in the southern Atlantic.

In 1963, a fresh shell of what was subsequently named Sphaerocypraea incomparabilis was dredged up by a Soviet trawler in the Gulf of Aden. There are currently (2009) only six known specimens of this shell in various collections.

== Taxonomy ==
The taxonomy of Eocypraeidae is not fully understood and has undergone several modifications.

=== 2005 taxonomy ===
According to the taxonomy of Bouchet & Rocroi (2005) this family belonged to the tribe Eocypraeini in the subfamily Ovulinae within the family Ovulidae.

=== 2007 taxonomy ===
Fehse (2007) has raised the tribe Eocypraeini to the status of the family Eocypraeidae, based on morphological research of the radulae, shell and animal morphology and molecular phylogeny research of the 16S ribosomal RNA gene.

=== 2016 taxonomy ===
Dolin thought that Eocypraeidae was part of the subfamily Prionovolvinae Fehse, 2007 in the family Ovulidae.

This line of thought was followed by Reijnen & van der Meij (2019) and even for a while by the database WoRMS and Zvonareva et al., 2020, each relying on a previous author.

=== 2021 taxonomy ===
In 2021 Fehse accepted the systematic position of Eocypraeidae as valid and more consistent. Still he urges for a complete revision of the Eocypraeidae as well as the fossil Cypraeidae based exclusively on the type shells.

== Genera ==
Genera within the family Eocypraeidae include:

Eocypraeinae F. A. Schilder, 1924

- † Allmoniella Dolin & Dockery, 2018
- † Apiocypraea F. A. Schilder, 1927
  - † Apiocypraea davidi (Fontannes, 1880)
  - † Apiocypraea parvoastensis (Sacco, 1894)
  - † Apiocypraea spatiosa Fehse, 2003
- † Cypropterina de Gregorio, 1880
- † Eocypraea Cossmann, 1903 It is extinct since the end of the Eocene. This is the type genus of the family.
- † Eschatocypraea F. A. Schilder, 1966
- † Grovesia Dolin & Ledon, 2002
- † Oxycypraea F. A. Schilder, 1927
- † Taviania Dolin & Pacaud, 2009
- † Borystheniella Pacaud, 2018 (uncertain > taxon inquirendum, controversial status)

Sulcocypraeinae Schilder, 1932

- † Gaskoinia Roberts, 1870 (assignment uncertain)
- † Luponovula Sacco, 1894 †
- Sphaerocypraea F. A. Schilder, 1927
- † Sulcocypraea Conrad, 1865
- † Willungia Powell, 1938

Synonyms

- Chimaeria Briano, 1993: synonym of Sphaerocypraea F. A. Schilder, 1927
- † Marginocypraea Ingram, 1947: synonym of Sphaerocypraea F. A. Schilder, 1927
