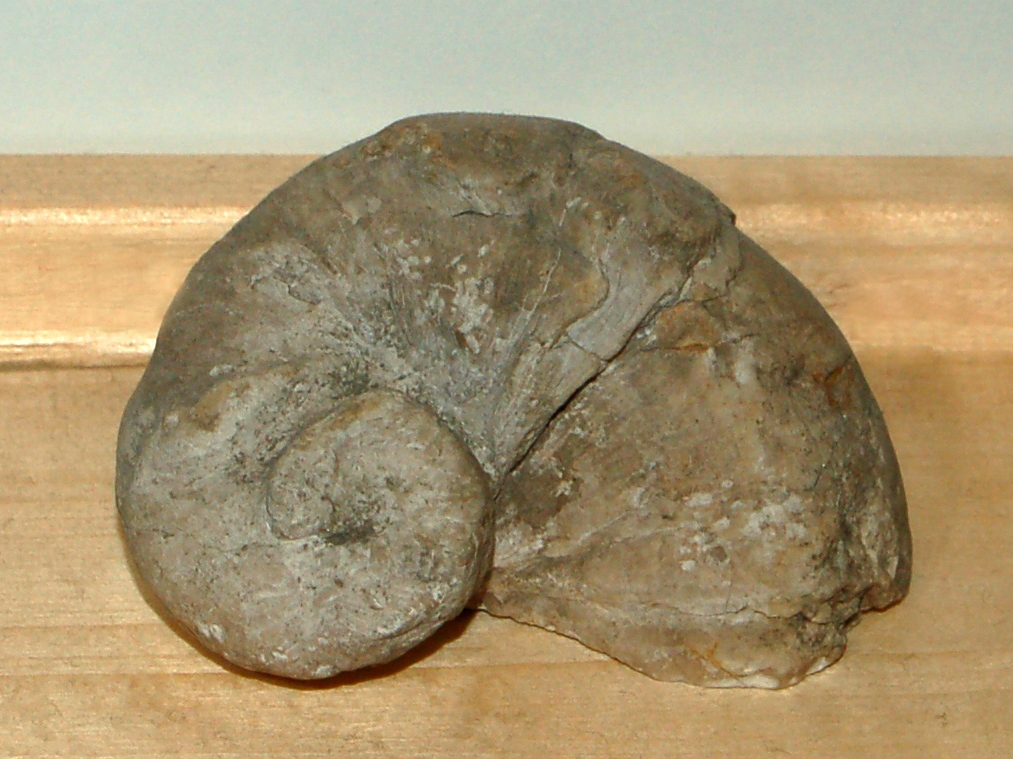
- Requienia ammonia from Cretaceous of France

Scientific classification
- Kingdom: Animalia
- Phylum: Mollusca
- Class: Bivalvia
- Order: †Hippuritida
- Family: †Requieniidae
- Genus: †Requienia; Zakhera, 2011

= Requienia (bivalve) =

Requienia Temporal range: Valanginian-Campanian ~140–71 Ma

Extinct genus of bivalves

Requienia is an extinct genus of fossil saltwater clam, a marine bivalve molluscs in the order Hippuritida, family Requieniidae. These rudists lived in the Cretaceous period, from the Valanginian age (136.4–140.2) to the Campanian age (70.6–83.5 mya). They were stationary intermediate-level suspension feeders.

== Distribution ==
This genus occurs in the Cretaceous of Albania (collection), Croatia, France, Germany, Hungary, Iraq, Italy, Mexico, Oman, Portugal, Serbia, Spain, Switzerland, Turkey, Ukraine, United States, Venezuela; Jurassic of Hungary.

== Species ==
- Requienia ammonia
- Requienia migliorinii
- Requienia renevieri
