= Bicornucopina =

Scientific classification
- Kingdom: Animalia
- Phylum: Mollusca
- Class: Bivalvia
- Order: †Hippuritida
- Family: †Monopleuridae
- Genus: †Bicornucopina; Hofmann, 1912

Type species
- Bicornucopina petersi Hofmann, 1912

Extinct bivalve genus

Bicornucopina is an extinct genus of bivalve that belongs to the family Monopleuridae. The genus lived in the region of Western Europe during the Early Cretaceous period from the early Aptian to Barremian age. The type species is a characteristic member of the Carpatho-Cimmerian bioprovince.

The genus is characterized by the dorsal side and convex being flat or depressed and their ventral sides being rounded. Their shell valves are hemispherical and arcuate. They also lack radial bands.

== Taxonomy ==
The genus currently contains two described species. They are listed below:

- Bicornucopina acuminata- Masse et al. 2026
- Bicornucopina petersi- Hofmann, 2012 (type species)

=== Taxonomic history ===
The genus was described in 2012 by Hofmann with the type species being Bicornucopina petersi. While it is now considered to be a member of the family Monopleuridae, its taxonomic placement since its description was unclear.

The genus was considered a close relative to Praecaprina and Pachytraga by Czabalay Lenke in 1968. It was even considered to be a close relative to Caprinula by Perkins and Coogan in the study Dechaseaux et al. 1969 however placed in an uncertain family by the rest of the papers authors. The existence of “radial canals” suggests that Bicornucopina may have possible affinities to the family Caprinidae. This possible affinity was rejected by Masse (1992). This was done by providing evidence that these “radial canals” correspond to radial partitions developed in the two RV teeth sockets.
