= Eoconus =

Scientific classification
- Kingdom: Animalia
- Phylum: Mollusca
- Class: Gastropoda
- Subclass: Caenogastropoda
- Order: Neogastropoda
- Superfamily: Conoidea
- Family: Conidae
- Genus: †Eoconus; J. K. Tucker & Tenorio, 2009

Type species
- † Conus sauridens Conrad, 1833

Extinct genus of gastropods

Eoconus is an extinct genus of sea snails, marine gastropod mollusks, in the family Conidae, the cone snails and their allies.

== Species ==
Species within the genus Eoconus include:

- † Eoconus bareti (Vasseur, 1882)
- † Eoconus derelictus (Deshayes, 1865)
- † Eoconus diversiformis (Deshayes, 1835)
- † Eoconus sauridens (Conrad, 1833)
- † Eoconus sulciferus (Deshayes, 1835)
- † Eoconus veteratoris Tracey & Craig, 2017
