= Tannuella =

Tannuella Temporal range: Early Cambrian

Scientific classification
- Domain: Eukaryota
- Kingdom: Animalia
- Phylum: Mollusca
- Class: †Helcionelloida
- Order: †Helcionelliformes
- Family: †Helcionellidae
- Genus: †Tannuella

Extinct genus of molluscs

Tannuella is a genus of helcionellids known from Lower Cambrian strata.

It has a high, septate shell similar to that of Knightoconus . These genera were once considered ancestral cephalopods, but are more broadly assigned to the helcionellids (or putatively the tergomyans); i.e. "Cambrian monoplacophora".
