= Metaconulus =

Scientific classification
- Kingdom: Animalia
- Phylum: Mollusca
- Class: Gastropoda
- Subclass: Vetigastropoda
- Order: Trochida
- Superfamily: Trochoidea
- Family: Calliostomatidae
- Genus: †Metaconulus; Cossmann, 1918

Synonyms
- Proconulus (Metaconulus) Cossmann, 1918

Extinct genus of gastropods

Metaconulus is an extinct genus of sea snails, marine gastropod mollusks, in the family Calliostomatidae within the superfamily Trochoidea, the top snails, turban snails and their allies.

== Species ==
Species within the genus Metaconulus include:

- † Metaconulus brasili (Cossmann, 1902)
- † Metaconulus heres (Deshayes, 1863)
- † Metaconulus mauliaensis Belliard & Gain, 2015

The following species were brought into synonymy:

- † Metaconulus buchozi LeRenard, 1994
- † Metaconulus princeps (Deshayes, 1863)
