= Requieniidae =

Requieniidae Temporal range: 155.7–66.043 Ma

Scientific classification
- Kingdom: Animalia
- Phylum: Mollusca
- Class: Bivalvia
- Order: †Hippuritida
- Suborder: †Requieniidina
- Superfamily: †Requienioidea
- Family: †Requieniidae

Family of extinct molluscs

Requieniidae is a family of rudists, in the order Hippuritida, which lived from 155.7 to 66.043 million years ago.

== Taxonomy ==
Placed by the WoRMS and Fossilworks.

Family Requieniidae Kutassy, 1934

- Subfamily: Matheroniinae
  - Genus: Hypelasma
  - Genus: Kugleria
  - Genus: Lovetchenia
  - Genus: Matheronia
  - Genus: Rutonia
- Subfamily: Requieniinae
  - Genus: Apricardia
  - Genus: Bayleia
  - Genus: Bayleoidea
  - Genus: Pseudotoucasia
  - Genus: Requienia
  - Genus: Toucasia
