= List of hyolith genera =

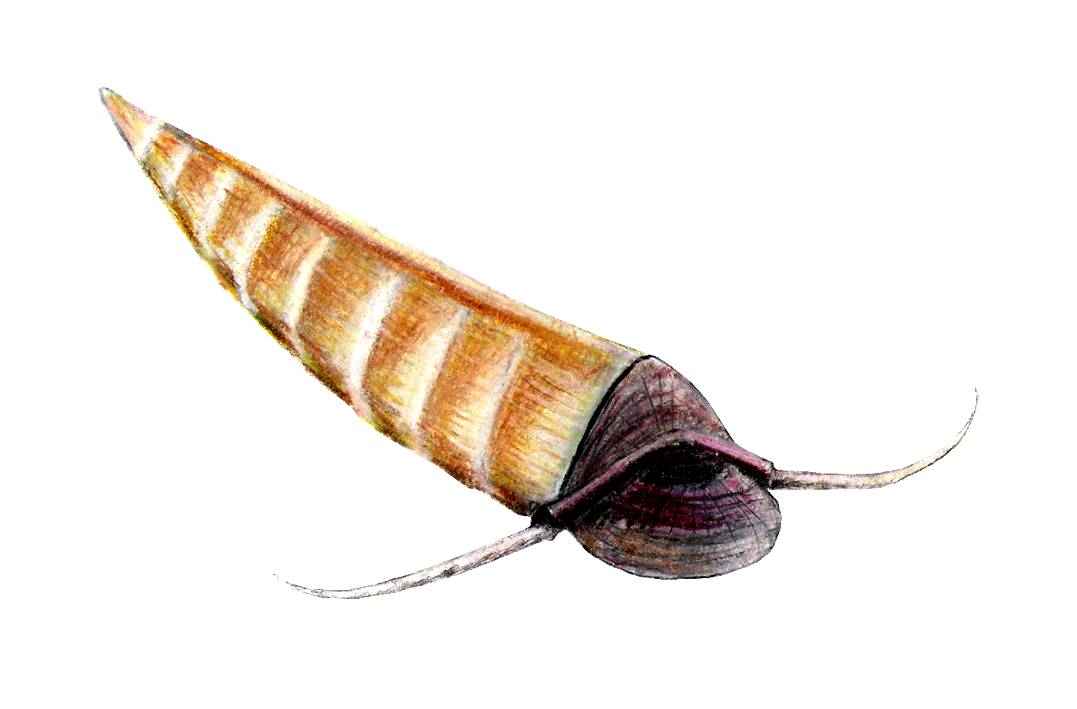
Haplophrentis

This list of hyoliths is an attempt to create a comprehensive listing of all genera from the fossil record that have ever been considered to be members of hyolitha, excluding purely vernacular terms. The list includes all commonly accepted genera, but also genera that are now considered invalid, doubtful (nomina dubia), or were not formally published (nomina nuda), as well as junior synonyms of more established names, and genera that are no longer considered hyoliths.

== Naming conventions and terminology ==
Naming conventions and terminology follow the International Code of Zoological Nomenclature. Technical terms used include:

- Junior synonym: A name which describes the same taxon as a previously published name. If two or more genera are formally designated and the type specimens are later assigned to the same genus, the first to be published (in chronological order) is the senior synonym, and all other instances are junior synonyms. Senior synonyms are generally used, except by special decision of the ICZN, but junior synonyms cannot be used again, even if deprecated. Junior synonymy is often subjective, unless the genera described were both based on the same type specimen.
- Nomen nudum (Latin for "naked name"): A name that has appeared in print but has not yet been formally published by the standards of the ICZN. Nomina nuda (the plural form) are invalid, and are therefore not italicized as a proper generic name would be. If the name is later formally published, that name is no longer a nomen nudum and will be italicized on this list. Often, the formally published name will differ from any nomina nuda that describe the same specimen.
- Nomen oblitum (Latin for "forgotten name"): A name that has not been used in the scientific community for more than fifty years after its original proposal.
- Preoccupied name: A name that is formally published, but which has already been used for another taxon. This second use is invalid (as are all subsequent uses) and the name must be replaced. As preoccupied names are not valid generic names, they will also go unitalicized on this list.
- Nomen dubium (Latin for "dubious name"): A name describing a fossil with no unique diagnostic features. As this can be an extremely subjective and controversial designation, this term is not used on this list.

== The list ==
Genus	Authors	Year	Status	Age	Location	Notes
Adyshevitheca						
Aimitus						
Aldanotheca						
Allatheca						
Altaicornus						
Ambrolinevitus						
Amydaicornus						
Anabaricornus						
Ancheilotheca						
Angusticornus						
Antiquatheca						
Arathecus						
Asijatheca						
Atdabanithes						
Bactrotheca						
Bolitheca						
Borealicornus						
Brevilabiatus						
Bucanotheca						
Burithes						
Calcitheca						
Camerotheca						
Carinitheca						
Carinolithes						
Cavernolites						
Ceratotheca						
Chelsonella						
Circotheca						
Cobboldiella						
Conotheca						
Contitheca						
Costatheca						
Crestjahitus						
Crossbitheca						
Cupitheca						Probably an orthothecid
Curtitheca						
Decipilites						
Decoritheca						
Devoniotheca						
Dilites						
Diplotheca						
Doescherina						
Doliutus						
Dorsojugatus						
Dorsolinevitus						
Ebianotheca						
Egdetheca						
Elegantilites						
Emarites						
Ensitheca						
Eonovitatus						
Erraticornus						
Eumorpholites						
Exilitheca						
Extentitheca						
Firmicornus						
Foersteotheca						
Galicornus						
Globorilus						
Globoritubulus						
Gompholites						
Goniocornus						
Gracilitheca						
Grandicornus						
Grantitheca						
Hallotheca						
Haplophrentis						
Helenia						
Holmitheca						
Hyolithes						
Hyptiotheca						
Inflaticornus						
Ingolitotheca						
Insignicornus						
Isititheca						
Jacuticornus						
Jacutolitus						
Joachimilites						
Ketemecornus						
Khetatheca						
Korilithes						
Kotuyitheca						
Kugdatheca						
Kunyangotheca						
Kuonamkicornus						
Kygmaeoceras						
Ladatheca						
Laratheca						
Laticornus						
Leibotheca						
Lenalitus						
Lenatheca						
Lentitheca						
Leolites						
Linevitus						
Lirotheca						
Loculitheca						
Lophotheca						
Macrotheca						The largest hyoliths, exceeding 20 cm in linear dimension
Majatheca						
Malykanotheca						
Meitanovitus						
Micatheca						
Microcornus						
Minitheca						
Mojczatheca						
Mooritheca						
Neobactrotheca						
Neogloborilus						
Neopauxillites						
Nephrotheca						
Nervolites						
Nevadotheca						
Nikatheca						
Nitoricornus						
Notabilitus						
Novakotheca						
Novitatus						
Obliquatheca						
Oblisicornus						
Oboedalites						
Orthotheca						
Ovalitheca						
Oxytus						
Panitheca						
Parahyolithes						
Parakorilithes						
Parkula						
Patholites						
Pauxillites						
Pedunculotheca						With a (disputed) pedicle
Persicitheca						
Petasotheca						
Planotheca						
Plicitheca						
Pseudotoxeuma						
Pterigotheca						
Quadrotheca						
Quinquelithes						
Rarissimetus						
Recilites						
Renitheca						
Rodentilites						
Semielliptotheca						
Slapylites						
Sokolovitheca						
Spinulitheca						
Stimulitheca						
Sulcagloborilus						
Sulcavitus						
Tajinella						
Tcharatheca						
Tchuranitheca						
Tetratheca						
Tizilites						
Toxeumorphora						
Trapezotheca						
Trapezovitus						
Tulenicornus						
Tuojdachithes						
Turcutheca						
Uniformitheca						
Virgatotheca						
Virgulaxonaria						
Xiadongtubulus						
Yacutolithuus						
Yankongovitus						

== See also ==
- List of prehistoric brittle stars
- List of prehistoric sea cucumbers
- List of crinoid genera
