= Yanjiahe Formation =

Geologic formation in Hubei, China

- Stratigraphic range: Ediacaran - Fortunian; ~542–529 Ma
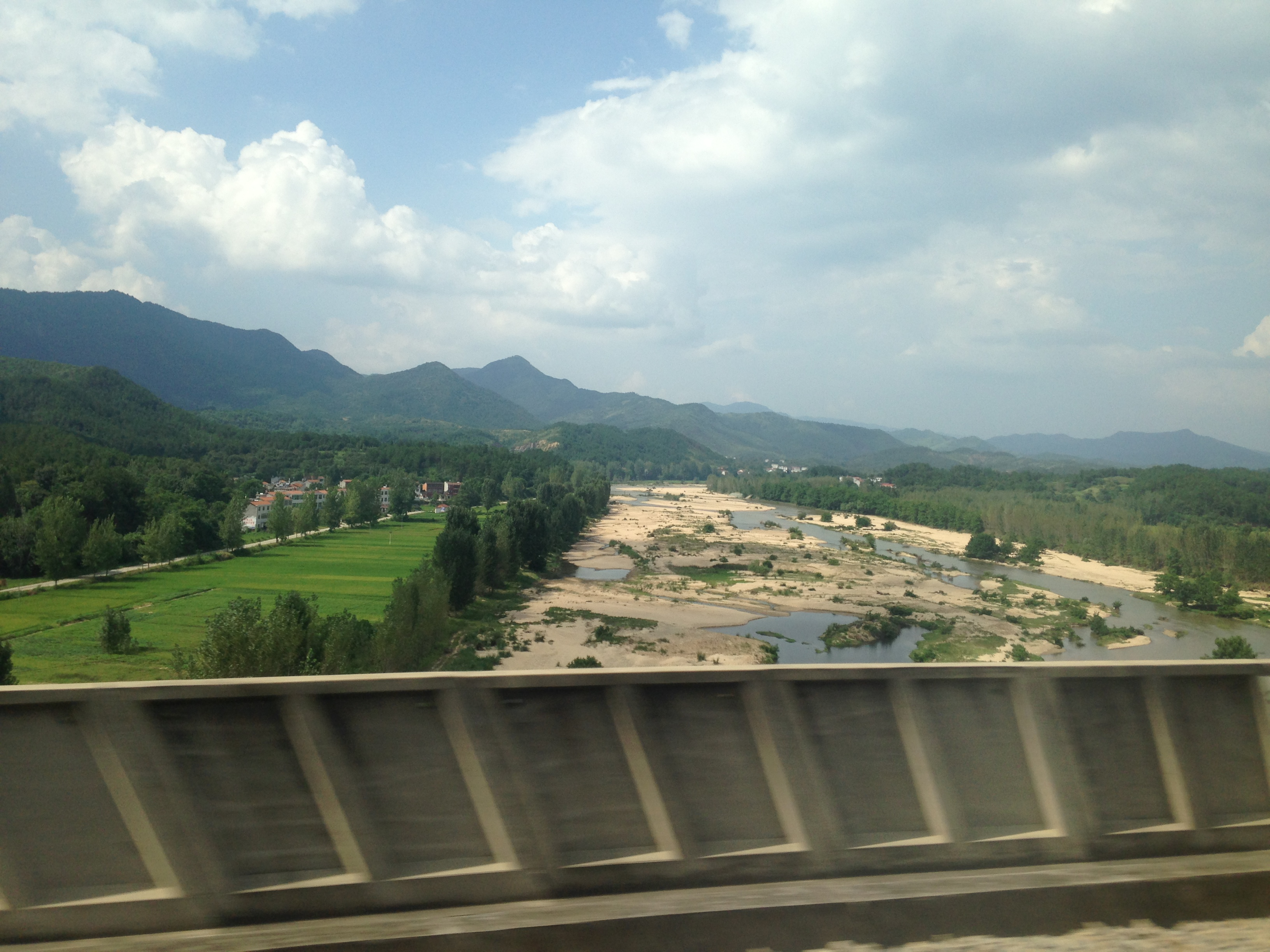
- View of Yanjiahe River in Macheng, Huanggang, Hubei, the locality after which the formation is named.
- Type: Formation
- Sub-units: See: Beds
- Underlies: (Major Hiatus) Shuijingtuo Formation
- Overlies: (Unconformably) Dengying Formation

Lithology
- Primary: Shale, limestone, dolomite
- Other: Chert, phosphorite

Location
- Coordinates: 30.8°N 111.3°E
- Approximate paleocoordinates: 27.6°N 160.2°E
- Region: Hubei
- Country: China
- Extent: Yangtze Gorges

Type section
- Named for: Yanjiahe River
- Yanjiahe Formation (China) Yanjiahe Formation (Hubei)

The Yanjiahe Formation is a late Ediacaran to early Cambrian aged geologic formation in Hubei Province, South China. It is a notably fossiliferous formation, with fossils found from the base to the top.

== Geology ==
The stratigraphy of Cambrian rocks in Hubei Province

The Yanjiahe Formation can be found outcropping in a quarry near to Luojiacun village in Hubei Province, South China. It unconformably overlies the siliceous dolostones of the Dengying Formation, whilst it is separated from the overlying shales of the Shuijingtuo Formation by a major sedimentary hiatus. The formation is composed of five beds, all of which contain fossil material to varying degrees.

=== Beds ===
The beds are as follows, in ascending stratigraphic order (lowest to highest):

- Bed 1: This bed is predominately composed of basal dolomitic conglomerates, with dolostone to sandy dolostone and banded black cherts found throughout.
- Bed 2: This bed is primarily composed of siliceous phosphatic dolostone, with flat pebble conglomerates.
- Bed 3: This bed, which is notably the thickest of the five, is variably composed of shales, with the presence of siliceous-phosphatic nodules, as well as layers of limestone.
- Bed 4: This bed is entirely composed of carbonaceous limestones.
- Bed 5: This bed is primarily composed of cherts and siliceous phosphatic dolostone, with flat pebble conglomerates.

== Dating ==
The Yanjiahe Formation has been dated through various methods. The top of the formation is dated at 526.5±1.1 Ma and 526.4±5.3 Ma using radiometric dating on ash beds within the area. Likewise, the base of the formation has been dated to between 542±0 Ma to 526±0 Ma through carbon isotopic correlations. This gives an overall temporal range of ~542 - 526 Ma, which is just 16 Ma in duration.

== Paleobiota ==
The Yanjiahe Formation contains a wide range of unique organisms from the base of the Cambrian, from the probable earliest stem group echinoderm Yanjiahella, to the ecdysozoan Beretella, alongside a large wealth of early molluscs, such as Watsonella and Scenella. The formation is also home to several large but incomplete ecdysozoan-like cuticles, exceeding the other fully complete ecdysozoans like Beretella and Saccorhytus in size. Despite their incompleteness, they still offer an insight into the already varied biodiversity of ecdysozoans during the early Cambrian. There can also be found a suite of acritarch microfossils, such as Comasphaeridium.

Color key
| Taxon | Reclassified taxon | Taxon falsely reported as present | Dubious taxon or junior synonym | Ichnotaxon | Ootaxon | Morphotaxon |

Notes
Uncertain or tentative taxa are in small text; ~~crossed out~~ taxa are discredited.

=== Cnidaria ===
Cnidaria
| Genus | Species | Notes | Images |
|---|---|---|---|
| Octapyrgites | O. elongatus | Olivooid Medusozoan, larger than any known Olivooid. | |
| Quadrapyrgites | O. quadratacris | Olivooid Medusozoan. | |
| Olivooides | Olivooides sp.; O. multisulcatus; O. mirabilis | Olivooid Medusozoan. | |
| Pseudooides | Pseudooides sp. | Medusozoan. | |
| Septuconularia | S. yanjiaheensis; S. crassiformis | Hexangulaconulariid Medusozoan. | |
| Decimoconularia | D. isofacialis | Hexangulaconulariid medusozoan. | |
| Carinachites | C. spinatus | Carinachitid cnidarian sclerite, related to the conulariids. | |
| Cambrorhytium | C. major | Elongated cone-like cnidarian. | |
| Sphenothallus | Sphenothallus sp. | Conulariid cnidarian. | |

=== Chancelloriida ===
Chancelloriida
| Genus | Species | Notes | Images |
|---|---|---|---|
| Chancelloria | Chancelloria sp. | Sponge-like eumetazoan. | |

=== Deuterostome ===
Deuterostome
| Genus | Species | Notes | Images |
|---|---|---|---|
| Protohertzina | P. unguliformis; P. anabarica; P. robusta | Possibly a Protoconodont, Paraconodont, or a Chaetognath. | |
| Tarimspira | T. plana | Possible Paraconodont. | |
| Yunnanodus | Yunnanodus sp.; Y. yanjiahensis | Possible Paraconodont. | |
| Yanjiahella | Y. biscarpa | Ambulacrarian; possibly earliest stem group echinoderm. | |
| Yuknessia | Yuknessia sp. | Unbranched pterobranch. | |
| Hertzina | H. guizhouensis; H. tenuis | Furnishinid Paraconodont. | |

=== Ecdysozoa ===
Ecdysozoa
| Genus | Species | Notes | Images |
|---|---|---|---|
| Beretella | B. spinosa | Possibly adult or larval ecdysozoan. | |
| Saccorhytus | Saccorhytus sp. | Possibly adult or larval ecdysozoan. | |

=== Lophotrochozoa ===
Lophotrochozoa
| Genus | Species | Notes | Images |
|---|---|---|---|
| Hyolithellus | H. tenuis?; H. decorus | Annelid lophotrochozoan, previously thought to be a Hyolith. | |
| Rushtonia | R. minuta | Annelid lophotrochozoan. | |
| Conotheca | C. subcurvata; C. obesa; C. nana; C. transulcata | Hyolith lophotrochozoan. | |
| Lapworthella | Lapworthella sp. | Tommotiid lophotrochozoan. | |
| Spinulitheca | S. billingsi | Hyolith lophotrochozoan. | |
| Microcornus | M. parvulus? | Hyolith lophotrochozoan. | |
| Cupitheca | C. mira | Hyolith lophotrochozoan. | |
| Turcutheca | T. crasseocochlia; T. lubrica | Hyolith lophotrochozoan. | |
| Lophotheca | L. costellata | Hyolith lophotrochozoan. | |
| Circotheca | C. longiconica; C. longiconica | Circothecid Hyolith. | |
| Aldanella | A. attleborensis; A. yanjiaheensis | Mollusc with a coiled shell. | |
| Eohalobia | E. diadongensis; Eohalobia sp. | Halkieriid mollusc. | |
| Ocruranus | Ocruranus sp.; O. trulliformis; O. finial | Halkieriid mollusc. | |
| Scenella | S. jijiapoensis | Scenellid mollusc. | |
| Siphogonuchites | S. triangularis | Siphogonuchitid mollusc. | |
| Maikhanella | M. pristinis | Maikhanellid mollusc. | |
| Aldanella | A. attleborensis; A. yanjiaheensis | Aldanellid mollusc. | |
| Lopochites | L. latezonalis | Lopochitid mollusc. | |
| Aegitellus | A. emeishanensis | Mollusc. | |
| Phyrgula | P. nana | Mollusc. | |
| Bemella | B. costa; B. simplex | Mollusc. | |
| Xianfengella | X. ovata; X. prima | Mollusc. | |
| Obtusoconus | O. paucicostatus | Mollusc. | |
| Paleosulcachites | P. biformis | Mollusc. | |
| Sacciconus | S. yanjiaheensis | Mollusc. | |
| Tuberoconus | T. paucipapillae | Mollusc. | |
| Watsonella | W. crosbyi | Mollusc. | |
| Anabarella | A. plana | Helcionelloid mollusc. | |
| Igorella | I. emeiensis; I. maidipingensis; Igorella sp. | Helcionelloid mollusc. | |
| Oelandiella | O. korobkovi | Helcionelloid mollusc. | |
| Ceratoconus | C. bucers | Helcionelloid mollusc. | |

=== Porifera ===
Porifera
| Genus | Species | Notes | Images |
|---|---|---|---|
| Blastulospongia | Blastulospongia sp. | Globular demosponge, previously postured to be a radiolarian. | |

=== incertae sedis ===
incertae sedis
| Genus | Species | Notes | Images |
|---|---|---|---|
| Anabarites | A. trisulcatus; A. tianzhushanensis; A. gracilis; A. ternarius; A. cf. ternarius | Anabaritid small shelly fossil. | |
| Tiksitheca | T. korobovi | Anabaritid small shelly fossil. | |
| Cambrotubulus | C. decurvatus | Anabaritid small shelly fossil. | |
| Protoconites | P. minor | Curved conical organism, possible relations to Cnidaria. | |
| Purella | P. antiqua; P. lepidites | Small shelly fossil. | |
| Emeiconus | E. antiqua | Small shelly fossil. | |
| Rugatotheca | Rugatotheca sp. | Small shelly fossil. | |
| Coleolella | C. recta | Small shelly fossil. | |
| Torellella | T. lentiformis | Tubicolous fossil. | |

=== Flora ===
Flora
| Genus | Species | Notes | Images |
|---|---|---|---|
| Archaeophycus | A. yunnanensis | Either a cyanobacteria or the early developmental stage of an alga. | (J) |
| Konglingiphyton (?) | Konglingiphyton (?) sp. | Macroalgae. | Konglingiphyton erecta from the Ancanping assemblage of the Doushantuo Formation |
| Megathrix | M. longus | Filamentous cyanobacterium. | |
| Myxococcoides | Myxococcoides spp. | Cyanobacteria. | |
| Archaeooides | A. granulates | Microalgae. | |
| Vendotaenia | Vendotaenia sp. | Ribbon-like organism. | |

=== Microorganisms ===
Microorganisms
| Genus | Species | Notes | Images |
|---|---|---|---|
| Asteridium | A. tornatum | Acritarch. | |
| Comasphaeridium | C. annulare | Acritarch. | |
| Heliosphaeridium | H. ampliatum | Acritarch. | |
| Micrhystridium | M. regulare | Acritarch. | |
| Yurtusia | Y. uniformis | Acritarch. | |
| Dictyotidium (?) | Dictyotidium (?) sp. | Acritarch. | |

=== Undescribed ===
Undescribed
| Genus | Species | Notes | Images |
|---|---|---|---|
| Hexactinellid spicules | ??? | A collection of monaxons, diaxons and triaxons. | |
| Unnamed probable cnidarian | ??? | Curved tubular organism, possible affinities to cnidarians. | |
| Form A | ??? | Four specimens with a vermiform morphology that is annulated in appearance, maximum known length is 3.1 mm (0.1 in). Surface ornamentation noted to resemble that seen in the pancrustacean Yicaris from the Yu’anshan Formation, as well as the ecdysozoan Saccorhytus from this formation. | |
| Form B | ??? | A singular specimen of a trunk segment covered in spines of varying sizes, maximum length of the specimen is 2.7 mm (0.1 in). Is comparable to various ecdysozoan groups, such as lobopods, and more so to the extant kinorhynchs. It is noted that if the latter interpretation is valid, the specimen would likely be placed as a crown-group kinorhynch, although more evidence is needed. | |
| Form C | ??? | The most abundant, with seventeen specimens known, and found in two modes of preservation. Specimens are covered in fractured spines of varying shapes, and the maximum known length of this form being 4.3 mm (0.2 in). Is noted to be comparable to various small shelly fossils such as Protohertzina and Mongolodus, and several ecdysozoans such as Eokinorhynchus, Scalidodendron, and Saccorhytus. | |
| Form D | ??? | Two specimens with a vermiform morphology, and is only known to attain a length of 1.8 mm (0.1 in), making it the smallest of the known forms. These specimens have been compared to the likes of Eopriapulites and Palaeoscolex. | |
| Form E | ??? | Two specimens, which are evenly covered in small papillate knobs, and attain a maximum known length of 4.9 mm (0.2 in). They have been compared to a wide range of papillate knob-bearing acritarchs, embryos, algae-like forms, and tentative sponges, such as Bacatisphaera, Archaeooides, Shaanisphaera, and Aetholicopalla respectively. | |
| Form F | ??? | Five specimens with a dense covering of short coniform to hook-like spines, and are the largest of the forms, attaining a maximum length of 8.9 mm (0.4 in). The five specimens are noted to bear a striking resemblance to Saccorhytus, although they are also notably much larger, suggesting that saccorhytids may have attained much larger sizes than currently known. | |

== See also ==
- Ediacaran biota
