= Ladatheca =

Scientific classification
- Kingdom: Animalia
- Class: †Hyolitha
- Order: †Hyolithida
- Family: †Hyolithidae
- Genus: †Ladatheca

Extinct genus of shelled animals

Ladatheca is a genus of hyolith that closely resembles Turcutheca. It has a straight conch with a smooth internal surface, and is found with what may be its operculum.
