= Bactrotheca =

Scientific classification
- Domain: Eukaryota
- Kingdom: Animalia
- Phylum: Brachiopoda
- Class: †Hyolitha
- Order: †Orthothecida
- Family: †Orthothecidae
- Genus: †Bactrotheca

Extinct genus of shelled animals

Bactrotheca is an extinct genus of orthothecid hyolith with a bulbous "protoconch".
