= Slapylitidae =

Slapylitidae Temporal range: Cambrian Stage 3 – Paibian

Scientific classification
- Kingdom: Animalia
- Class: †Hyolitha
- Order: †Hyolithida
- Family: †Slapylitidae; Valent, Martin; Fatka, Oldřich; Marek, Ladislav (2017)

Genera
- Slapylites Marek, 1980; Nevadalites Marek, 1976

Extinct family of shelled animals

Slapylitidae is a family of hyolithid hyoliths known from articulated skeletons that lack helens. This family is now extinct. The two genera included in this family are Slapylites and Nevadalites, which are found in the mid-Cambrian, particularly of the Barrundian area. A possible additional representative in the open systematic nomenclature might extend the range of this genus to the Devonian.
