= Conotheca =

Conotheca Temporal range: Cambrian

Scientific classification
- Domain: Eukaryota
- Kingdom: Animalia
- Phylum: Brachiopoda
- Class: †Hyolitha
- Order: †Orthothecida (?)
- Family: †Circothecidae
- Genus: †Conotheca; Rozanov et al. 1969

Extinct genus of shelled animals

Conotheca is a genus of Cambrian hyoliths.
