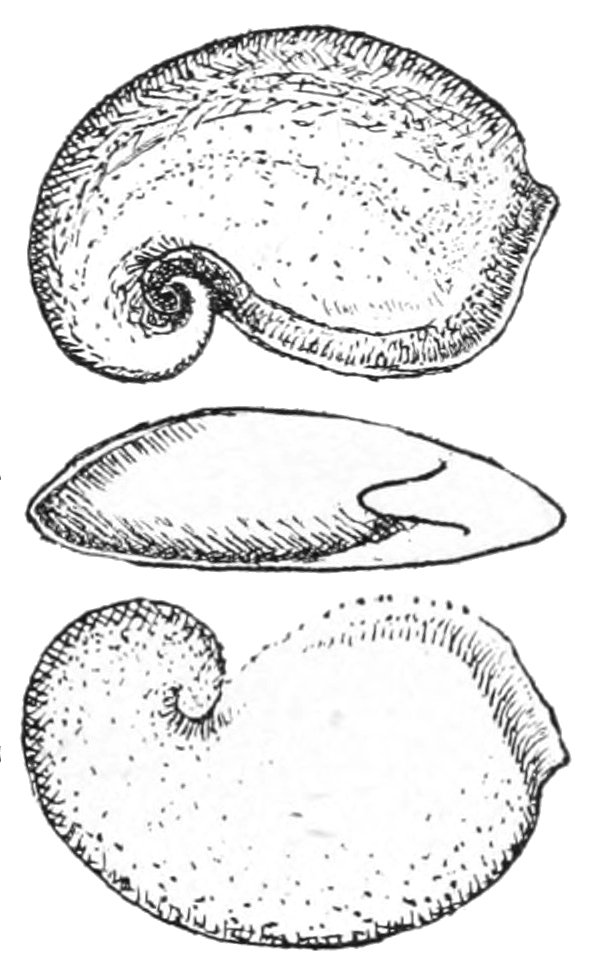
- Drawing of the apical, apertural and basal view of Pelagiella atlantoides.

Scientific classification
- Kingdom: Animalia
- Phylum: Mollusca
- Class: incertae sedis
- Superfamily: †Pelagielloidea
- Family: †Pelagiellidae; Knight, 1956

Genera
- See text

Synonyms
- Proeccyliopteridae Kobayashi, 1962 (n.a.); Protoscaevogyridae Kobayashi, 1962 (n.a.)

= Pelagiellidae =

Extinct family of gastropods

Pelagiellidae is an extinct family of Paleozoic fossil 'snails'. Some material assigned to this taxon represents gastropod molluscs, but some chaeta-bearing specimens first assigned to Pelagiella (now Pseudopelagiella) are perhaps better interpreted as tube-bearing annelid worms.

== Mineralogy ==
Aragonite, with various microstructures - details in reference

== Taxonomy ==
The taxonomy of the Gastropoda by Bouchet & Rocroi, 2005 categorizes Pelagiellidae in the superfamilia Pelagielloidea within the Paleozoic molluscs of uncertain systematic position. This family has no subfamilies.

According to P. Yu. Parkhaev, the family Pelagiellidae is in the order Pelagielliformes MacKinnon, 1985 within the subclass Archaeobranchia Parkhaev, 2001, in the class Helcionelloida Peel, 1991.

=== Genera ===
Genera in the family Pelagiellidae include:

- Pelagiella Matthew, 1895 - type genus of the family Pelagiellidae
  - Pelagiella atlantoides - synonym: Cyrtolithes atlantoides
  - Pelagiella emeishanensis - image
  - Pelagiella exigua - synonym: Pseudopelagiella exigua
- Proeccyliopterus Kobayashi, 1962
- Protoscaevogyra Kobayashi, 1939
- Cambretina Horný, 1964
- Costipelagiella Horný, 1964
