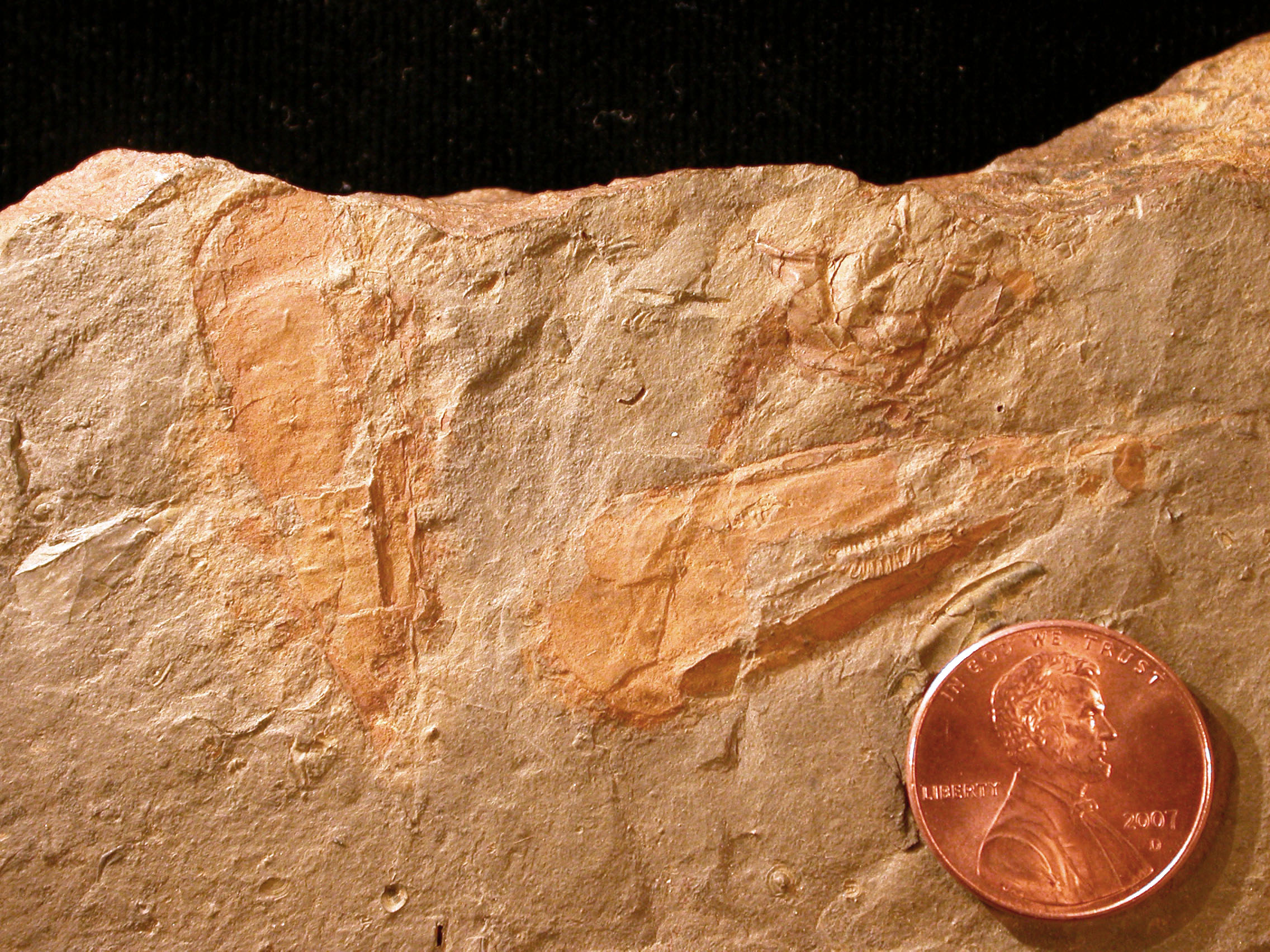
- Hyolithes cerops
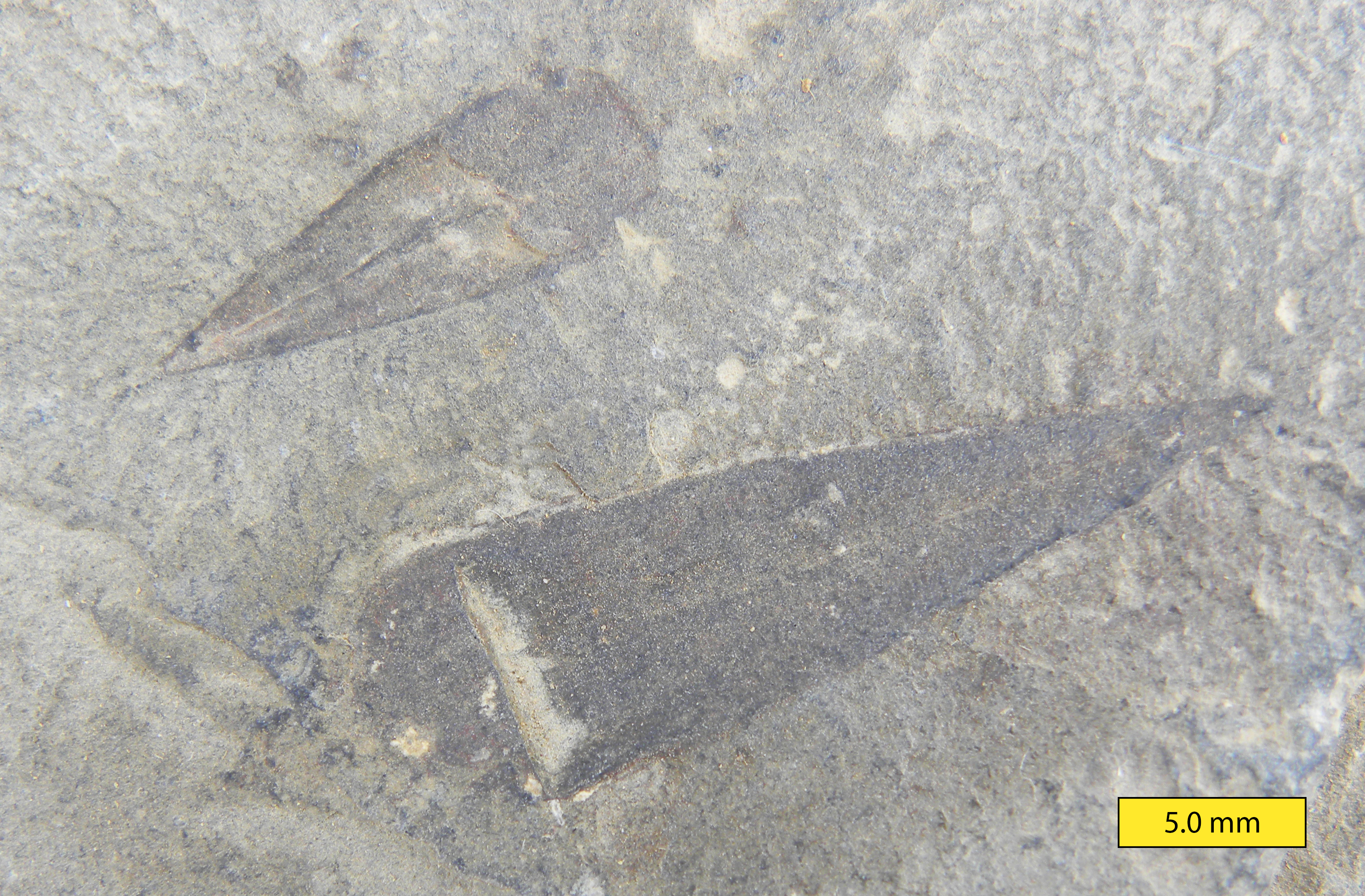
- Haplophrentis carinatus

Scientific classification
- Kingdom: Animalia
- Class: †Hyolitha
- Order: †Hyolithida
- Family: †Hyolithidae; Nicholson, 1872

Type genus
- †Hyolithes d'Eichwald, 1840

Genera
- See text

= Hyolithidae =

Hyolithidae Temporal range: Early Cambrian–Late Permian

Extinct family of lophotrochozoans

The Hyolithidae are a family of hyoliths (an extinct class of basal lophotrochozoans) that lived from the Early Cambrian until the Late Permian.

== Genera ==
- †Brittanella Malinky & Racheboeuf, 2010
- †Carinolithes Sysoev, 1958
- †Dilytes Marek, 1974
- †Elegantilites Marek, 1966
- †Eumorpholites Marek, 1967
- †Gompholites Marek, 1967
- †Hallotheca Malinky, Linsley & Yochelson, 1987
- †Haplophrentis Matthew, 1899
- †Helenia Walcott, 1890
- †Hyolithes d'Eichwald, 1840 (type)
- †Joachimilites Marek, 1967
- †Korilithes Missarzhevsky, 1969
- †Maxilites Marek, 1972
- †Nevadalites Marek, 1976
- †Nevadotheca Malinky, 1988
- †Novakotheca Malinky, 1990

=== Possible members ===
- †Amphorotheca Pillet & Beaulieu, 1995
- †Australolithes Burrow & Smith, 2024
- †Nervolites Marek, 1974
- †Sololites Marek, 1967
- †Yalarrnga Kruse, 2002
