= Pelagielloidea =

Pelagielloidea Temporal range: Middle Ordovician–Late Ordovician

Scientific classification
- Kingdom: Animalia
- Phylum: Mollusca
- Class: incertae sedis
- Superfamily: †Pelagielloidea; Knight, 1956

Extinct superfamily of molluscs

Pelagielloidea is an extinct superfamily of Paleozoic fossil molluscs of uncertain position, either (Gastropoda or Monoplacophora).

== Families ==
Families in the superfamily Pelagielloidea:

- † Pelagiellidae
- † Aldanellidae
