= Turcutheca =

Turcutheca Temporal range: Early Cambrian

Scientific classification
- Domain: Eukaryota
- Kingdom: Animalia
- Phylum: Brachiopoda
- Class: †Hyolitha
- Order: †Orthothecida (?)
- Family: †Circothecidae
- Genus: †Turcutheca

Extinct genus of molluscs

Turcutheca is a Tommotian (Early Cambrian) genus of shelly fossil whose affinities are uncertain, generally considered as an orthothecid hyolith (which would make it a brachiopod, but also resembling the ellesmeroceratids (early cephalopods).
