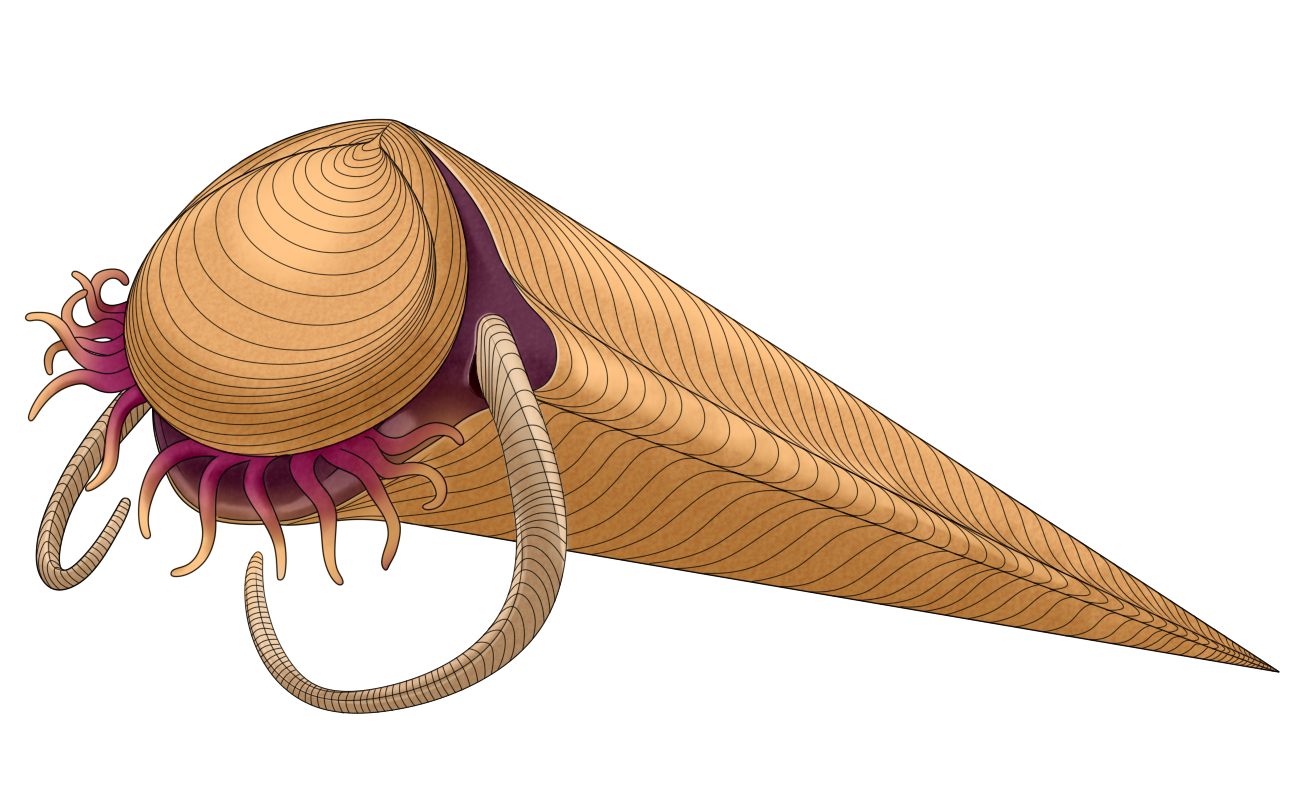
- Reconstruction of Haplophrentis

Scientific classification
- Kingdom: Animalia
- Class: †Hyolitha
- Order: †Hyolithida
- Family: †Hyolithidae
- Genus: †Haplophrentis; Matthew, 1899

Species
- H. carinatus (Matthew, 1899) (= H. cecrops Walcott); H. reesei Babcock & Robison 1988 (type)

= Haplophrentis =

Haplophrentis Temporal range: Middle Cambrian

Extinct genus of Cambrian organisms

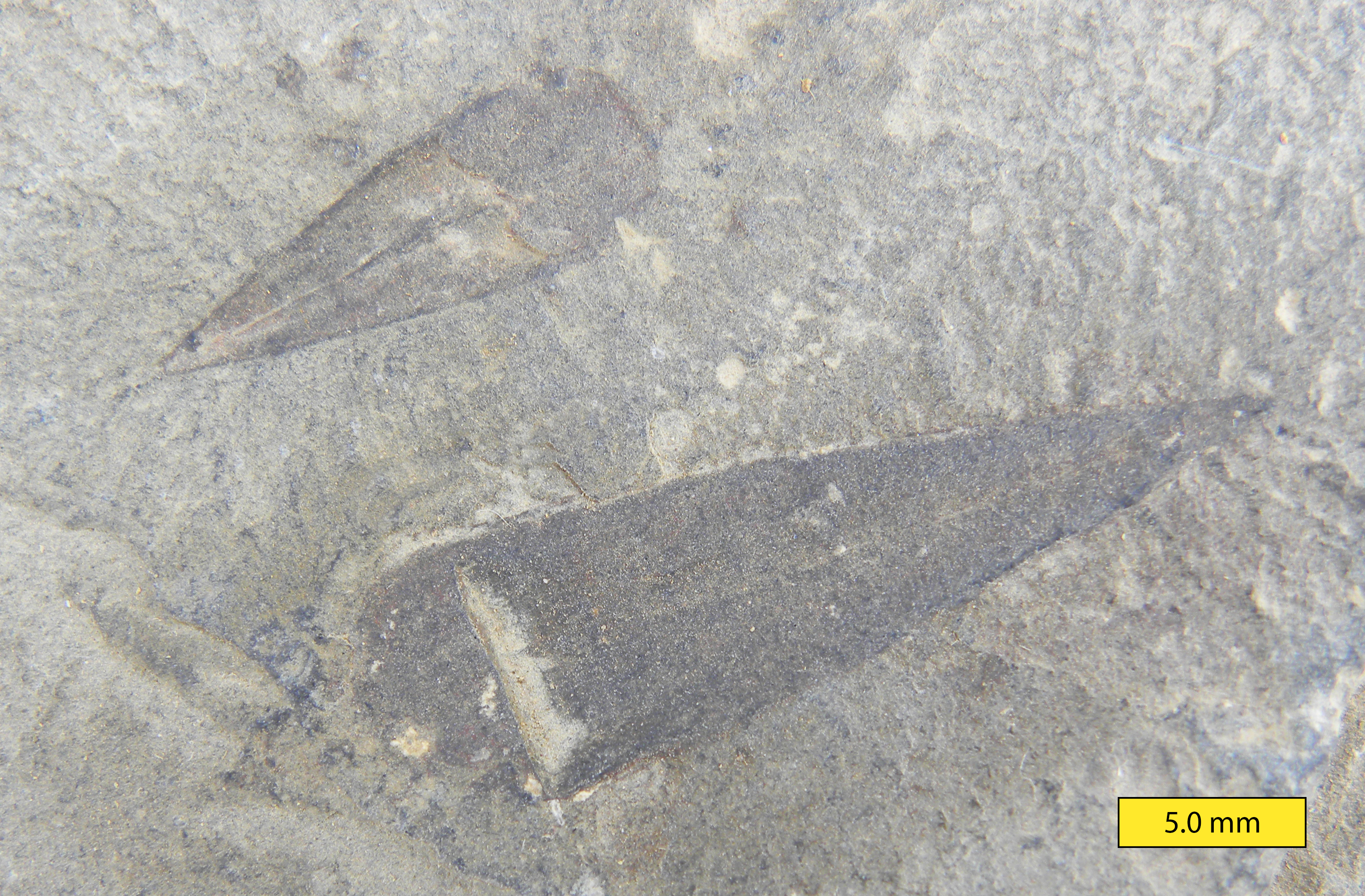
Haplophrentis carinatus from the Stephen Formation, Burgess Shale (Middle Cambrian), Burgess Pass, British Columbia, Canada.

Haplophrentis is a genus of tiny shelled hyolithid which lived in the Cambrian Period. Its shell was long and conical, with the open end protected by an operculum, from which two fleshy arms called helens protruded at the sides. These arms served to elevate the opening of the shells above the sea floor, acting like stilts.

== Morphology ==
Shell length of H. reesi reached up to 4.6 centimetres (1.8 in) while H. carinatus reached up to 3.05 centimetres (1.20 in). Juveniles could of course be smaller. It is distinguished from Hyolithes by the presence of a longitudinal septum on the middle of the inner surface of the top of the shell.

Its soft anatomy comprises 12 (H. carinatus) to 16 (H. reesi) tentacles attached to a horseshoe-shaped lophophore. A pair of wide structures of uncertain function extend along the length of the conical shell. A larval shell is attached to the shell apex.

== Affinity ==
The soft anatomy of Haplophrentis was key to establishing the hyoliths as members of the Lophophorata, the group containing brachiopods and phoronids. While some studies supported this interpretation, other studies considered hyoliths as basal lophotrochozoans or mollusks.

== Ecology ==
Haplophrentis was a filter feeder, using its lophophore to extract organic matter from passing seawater. Specimens of Haplophrentis have been found in the gut of the predator Ottoia.

== Occurrence ==
186 specimens of Haplophrentis are known from the Greater Phyllopod bed, where they comprise 0.35% of the community. It is also known from several specimens in the Spence Shale, and occurs prolifically at the Marble Canyon locality. Many specimens at Stanley Glacier display soft tissue well.
