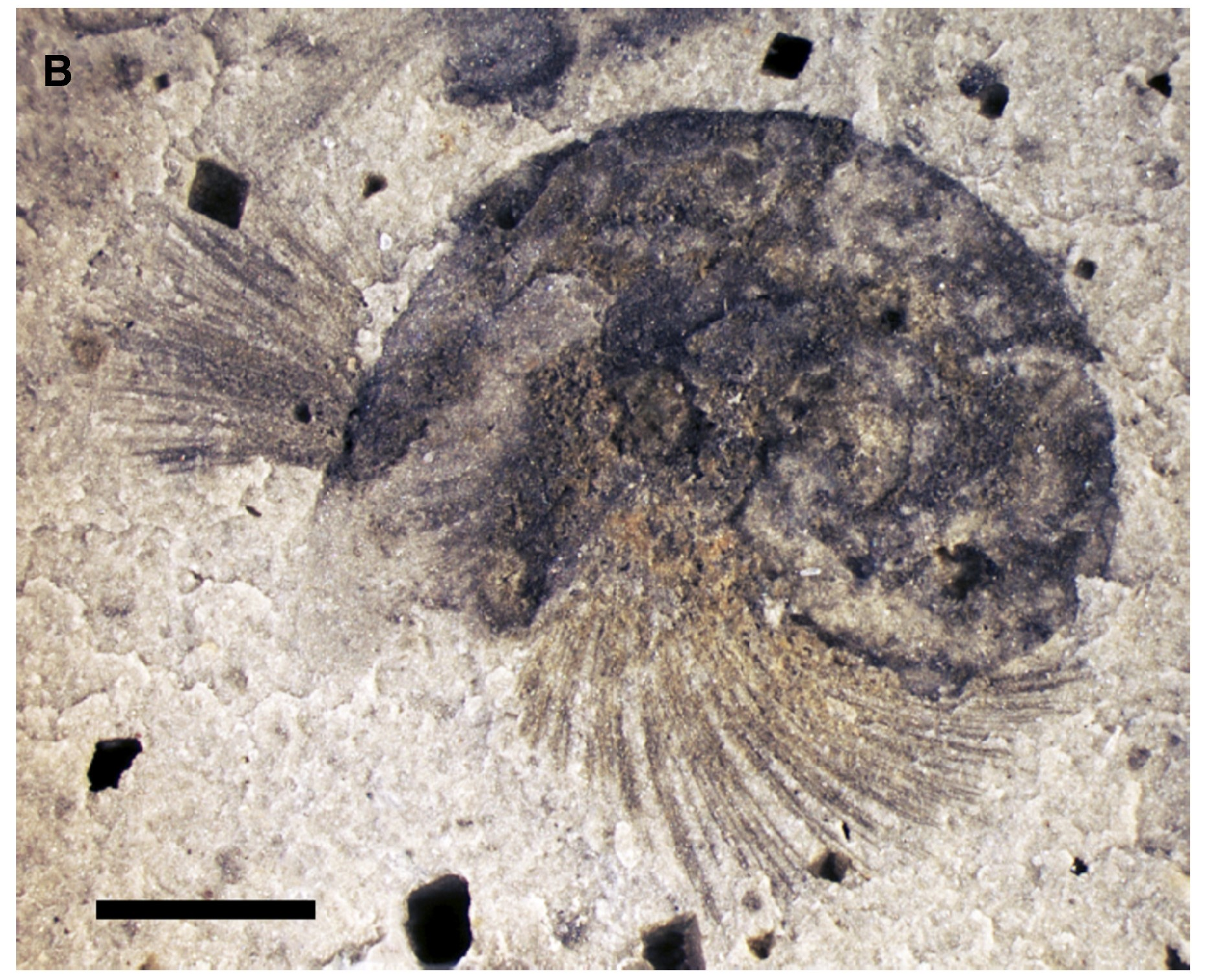
- Fossil of "Pelagiella" exigua

Scientific classification
- Kingdom: Animalia
- Phylum: Annelida (?)
- Genus: †Pseudopelagiella; Landing, Geyer, Jirkov & Schiaparelli, 2021
- Species: †P. exigua

Binomial name
- †Pseudopelagiella exigua (Resser & Howell, 1938)

= Pseudopelagiella =

Pseudopelagiella Temporal range: 512 Ma

Extinct genus of protostome

Pseudopelagiella is a genus established by Landing Ed. to separate the chaetose members that were previously assigned to Pelagiella. It may be invalid.

The only species in the genus, Pseudopelagiella exigua, was originally described as Pelagiella exigua.

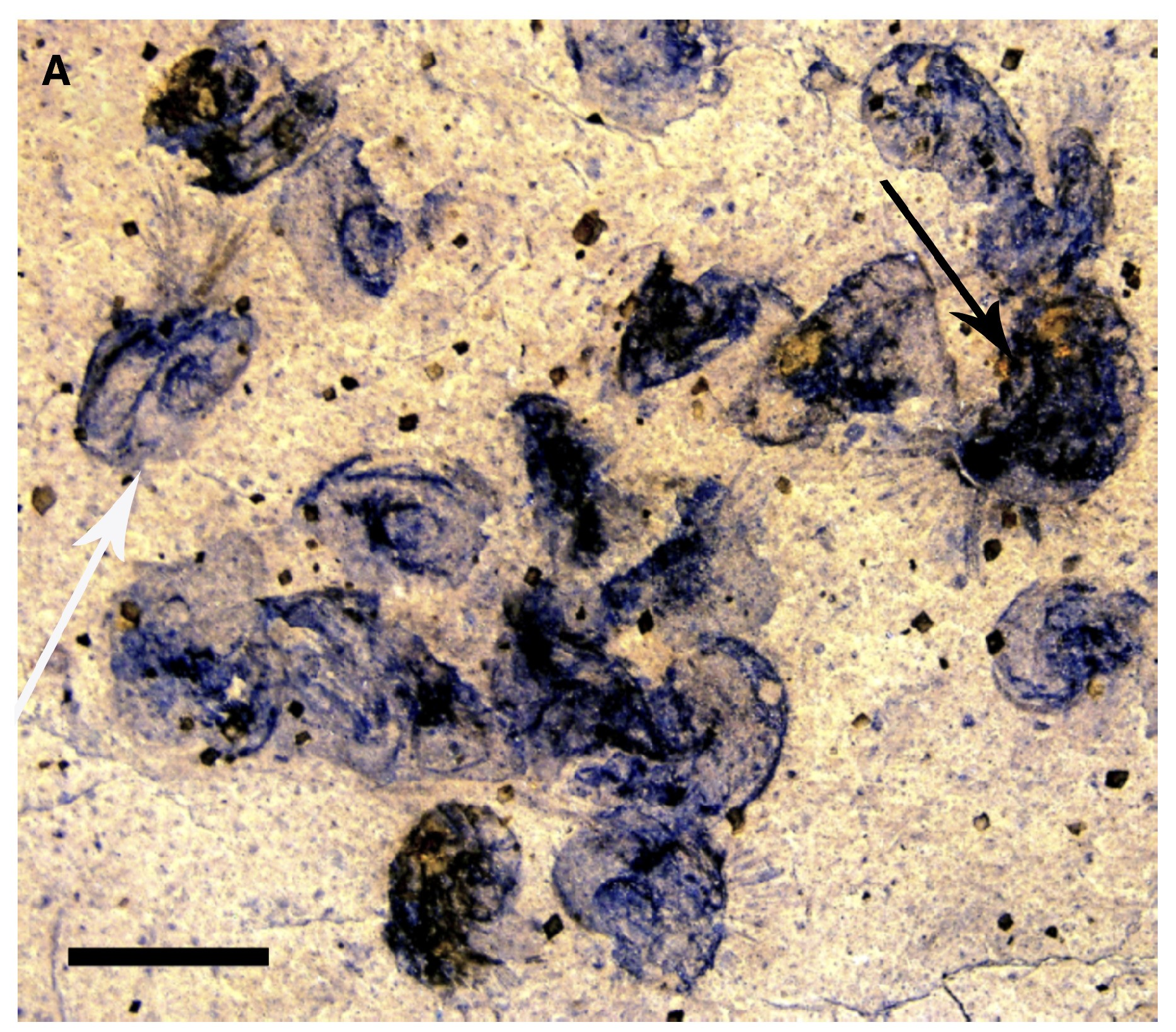
Fossilized groups of Pseudopelagiella

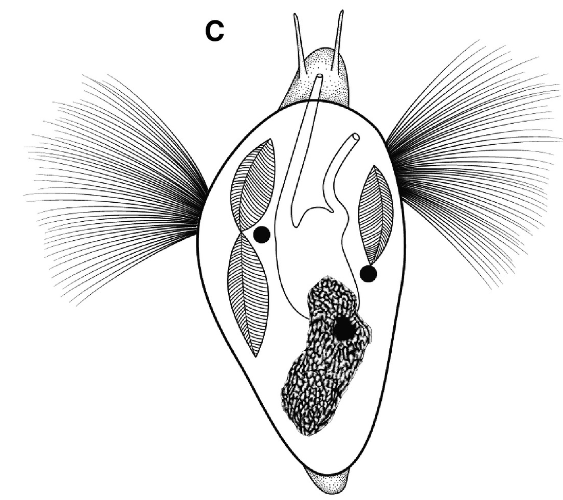
Internal reconstruction of Pseudopelagiella exigua when it was still part of Pelagiella as a mollusk with a U-shaped gut with setae.

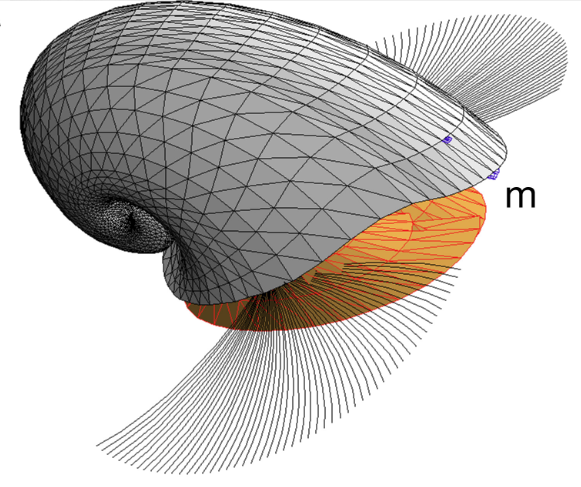
Reconstruction of Pseudopelagiella in 3D.
