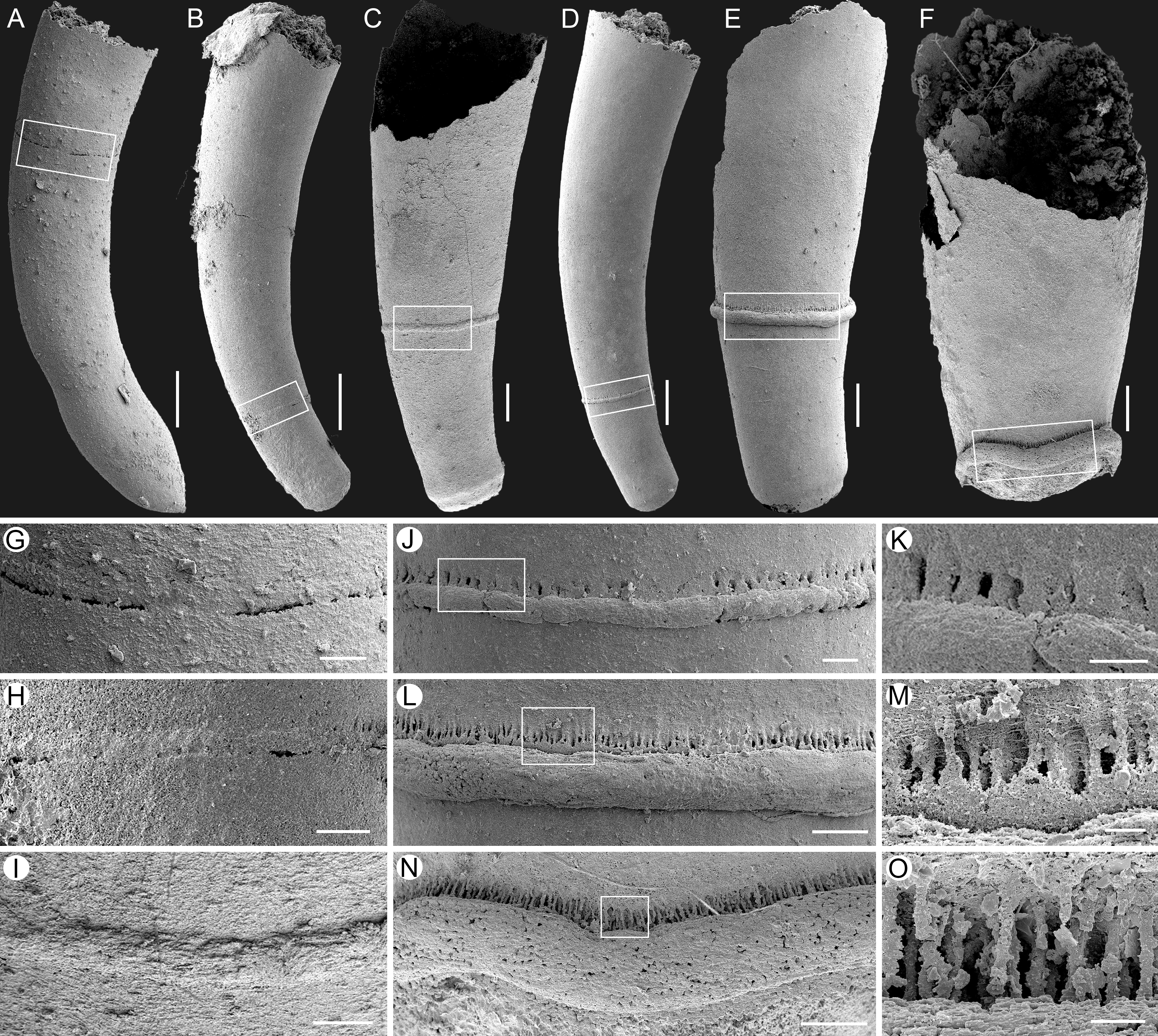
- Fossils of Cupitheca decollata

Scientific classification
- Kingdom: Animalia
- Class: †Hyolitha
- Order: †incertae sedis
- Genus: †Cupitheca; Duan in Xing et al., 1984

Species
- †C. clathrata Bengtson in Bengtson et al., 1990; †C. costellata Xiao & Zhou, 1984; †C. convexa Sun et al., 2018; †C. decollata Sun et al., 2019; †C. holocyclata Bengtson in Bengtson et al., 1990; †C. mira He in Qian, 1977

= Cupitheca =

Extinct genus of shelled animals

Cupitheca is a genus of Cambrian hyolith with the unusual distinction of shedding the apex of its camerate conical shell. As with Triplicatella and Hyptiotheca, its designation to the hyolithids or orthothecids is not straightforward, exhibiting as it does a mixture of the characters that would normally demark the two subtaxa of Hyolitha.
