= Pedunculotheca =

Pedunculotheca Temporal range: Chengjiang

Scientific classification
- Kingdom: Animalia
- Class: †Hyolitha
- Order: †Orthothecida
- Genus: †Pedunculotheca
- Species: †P. diania

Binomial name
- †Pedunculotheca diania Sun, Zhao & Zhu 2018

Extinct genus of shelled animals

Pedunculotheca is a genus of orthothecid hyolith known from the Chengjiang biota of China, notable for its possession of a pedunculate attachment structure likened to the brachiopod pedicle.

On account of this pedicle and its flattened larval shell, it is reconstructed as the earliest diverging hyolith, and a model for the ancestral morphology of this lineage of stem-group brachiopods.
