= Orthotheca =

Orthotheca Temporal range: Early Cambrian–Early Devonian

Scientific classification
- Domain: Eukaryota
- Kingdom: Animalia
- Phylum: Brachiopoda
- Class: †Hyolitha
- Order: †Orthothecida
- Family: †Orthothecidae; Sysoev, 1958
- Genus: †Orthotheca; Novák, 1886

Species
- O. shriveri Malinky, 2009; Others, please add...

Extinct genus of molluscs

Orthotheca is a genus of sessile bottom-dwelling hyolith.
