= Aldanellidae =

Aldanellidae Temporal range: Nemakit-Daldynian–Atdabanian

Scientific classification
- Kingdom: Animalia
- Phylum: Mollusca
- Class: incertae sedis
- Superfamily: †Pelagielloidea
- Family: †Aldanellidae; Linsley & Kier, 1984

Genera
- see text.

Extinct family of molluscs

Aldanellidae is an extinct family of paleozoic molluscs that have been assigned to the Gastropod stem group but may also belong to a paraphyletic "Monoplacophora".

== Occurrence ==
In the upper Nemakit-Daldyninan, and possibly earlier in Mongolia.

== Systematics ==
The taxonomy of the Gastropoda by Bouchet & Rocroi, 2005 categorizes Aldanellidae in the superfamilia Pelagielloidea within the Paleozoic molluscs of uncertain systematic position. This family has no subfamilies.

According to the P. Yu. Parkhaev, is the Pelagiellidae the family in the order Pelagielliformes MacKinnon, 1985 within the subclass Archaeobranchia Parkhaev, 2001 in the class Helcionelloida Peel, 1991.

== Genera ==
Genera in the family Aldanellidae include:

- Aldanella, Vostokova, 1962 – type genus of the family Aldanellidae
