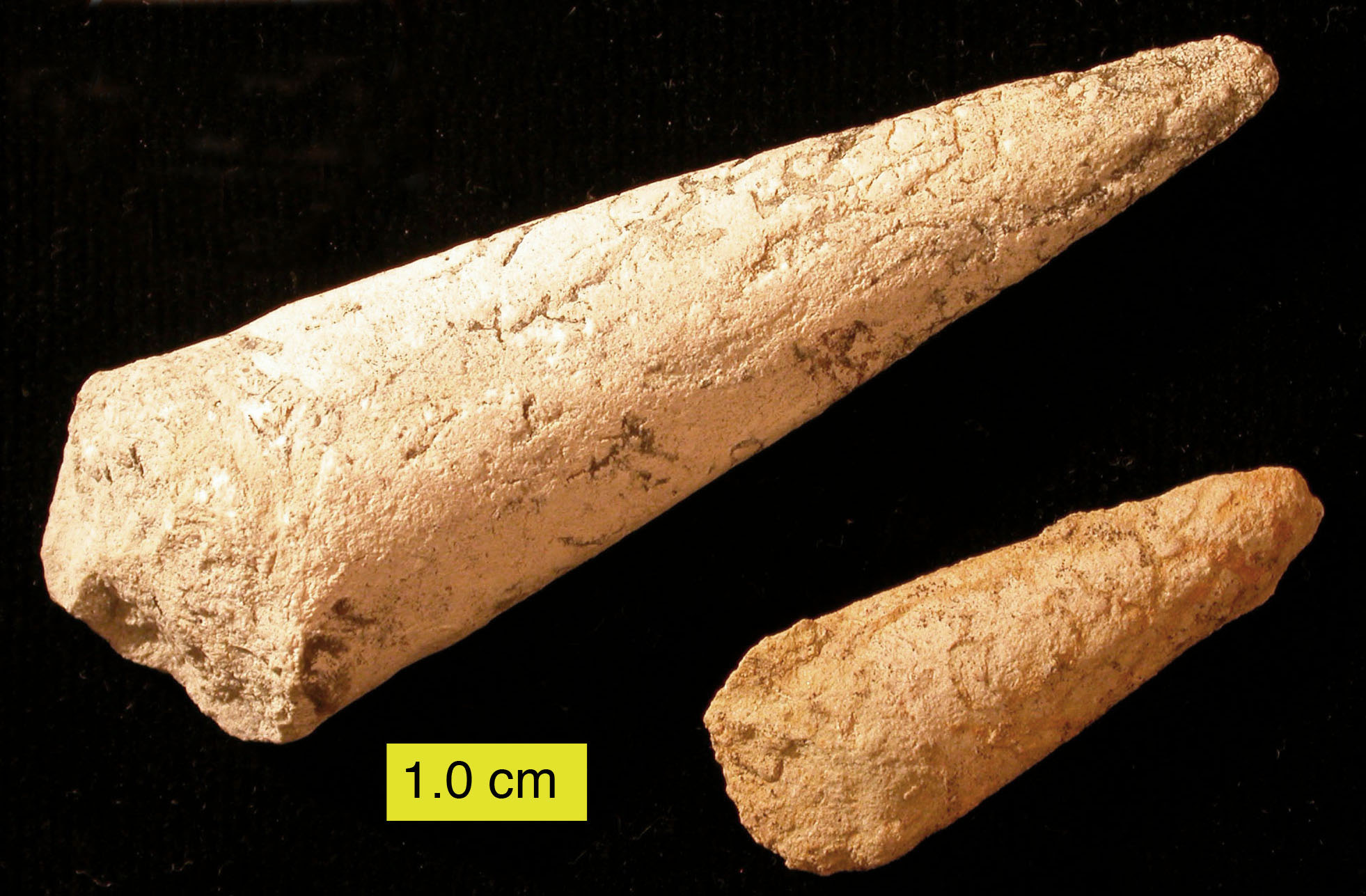

Scientific classification
- Kingdom: Animalia
- Class: †Hyolitha
- Order: †Hyolithida; Sussoiev, 1957

Families
- See text

= Hyolithida =

Hyolithida Temporal range: Early Cambrian – Upper Permian

Extinct order of lophotrochozoans

Hyolithida is an extinct order of lophotrochozoans, one of the two of hyoliths, the other being the Orthothecida. Most information on the hyolithids comes from studies on the Hyolitha. Both orders had an operculum that was not hinged to the conch. However, the Hyolithida are distinct from the Orthothecida in having additional paired, curved, tusk-like appendages. The Hyolithida were probably bottom feeders living in shallow water, and had tentacles.

== Families ==
Known families of the Hyolithida are:

- †Aimitidae Sysoiev, 1968
- †Aladracidae Geyer, 2017
- †Altaicornidae Sysoiev, 1970
- †Amydaicornidae Valkov, 1975
- †Angusticornidae Sysoiev, 1968
- †Australothecidae Malinky, 2009
- †Carinolithidae Marek in Valent, Fatka, Szabad & Vokáč, 2011
- †Crestjahitidae Sysoiev, 1968
- †Galicornidae Valkov, 1975
- †Hyolithidae Nicholson, 1872
- †Nelegerocornidae Meshkova, 1974
- †Notabilitidae Sysoiev, 1968
- †Pauxillitidae Marek, 1967
- †Pterygothecidae Sysoiev, 1958
- †Similothecidae Malinky, 1988
- †Trapezovitidae Valkov, 1975
