= Circothecidae =

Scientific classification
- Domain: Eukaryota
- Kingdom: Animalia
- Phylum: Brachiopoda
- Class: †Hyolitha
- Order: †Orthothecida (?)
- Family: †Circothecidae

Extinct family of problematic fossils

Circothecidae are a family of Cambrian problematica, sometimes attributed to the Hyolitha, though some authors suggest (on the basis of no specified evidence) that they are definitely not.
