= Orthothecida =

Orthothecida Temporal range: Early Cambrian – Early Devonian

Scientific classification
- Kingdom: Animalia
- Class: †Hyolitha
- Order: †Orthothecida; Marek, 1966

Families
- Allathecidae Rozanov et al., 1969; Circothecidae Rozanov et al., 1969; Gracilithecidae Syssoiev, 1972; Orthothecidae Syssoiev, 1957; Tetrathecidae Sysoyev, 1968

Extinct order of shelled animals

The orthothecids are one of the two hyolith orders.

Marek diagnoses the order thus: Conchs with a flat or concave ventral surface — opercula with large, flat cardinal processes but without clavicles – tightly sigmoidal, sediment-filled intestine – helens absent.

Sometimes the Circothecidae and Tetrathecidae are split out into a separate order 'Circothecida', which is defined by the bottom surface not being flat, the cardinal processes being pronounced, and a circular rim sometimes showing hints of differentiation into clavicles.

== Internal taxonomy ==
Marek gives the following diagnoses:

- Orthothecidae: Flat or concave bottom surface of conical shell. Transverse aperture.

Kouchinsky lists the following taxonomic criteria:

- Circothecidae: circular cross-section; same shape and sculpture on upper and lower surfaces.
- Turcurthecidae: oval or lenticular cross-section; top and bottom identical
- Allathecidae: top side flat or slightly convex; bottom side convex

Elsewhere is stated:

- Tetrathecidae: polyhedral cross-section; shell axially twisted
- Novitatidae: bottom side concave
- Lenatheca: aperture heart-shaped.

Additional genera are not assigned to a family:

- Probactrotheca
- Pedunculotheca
