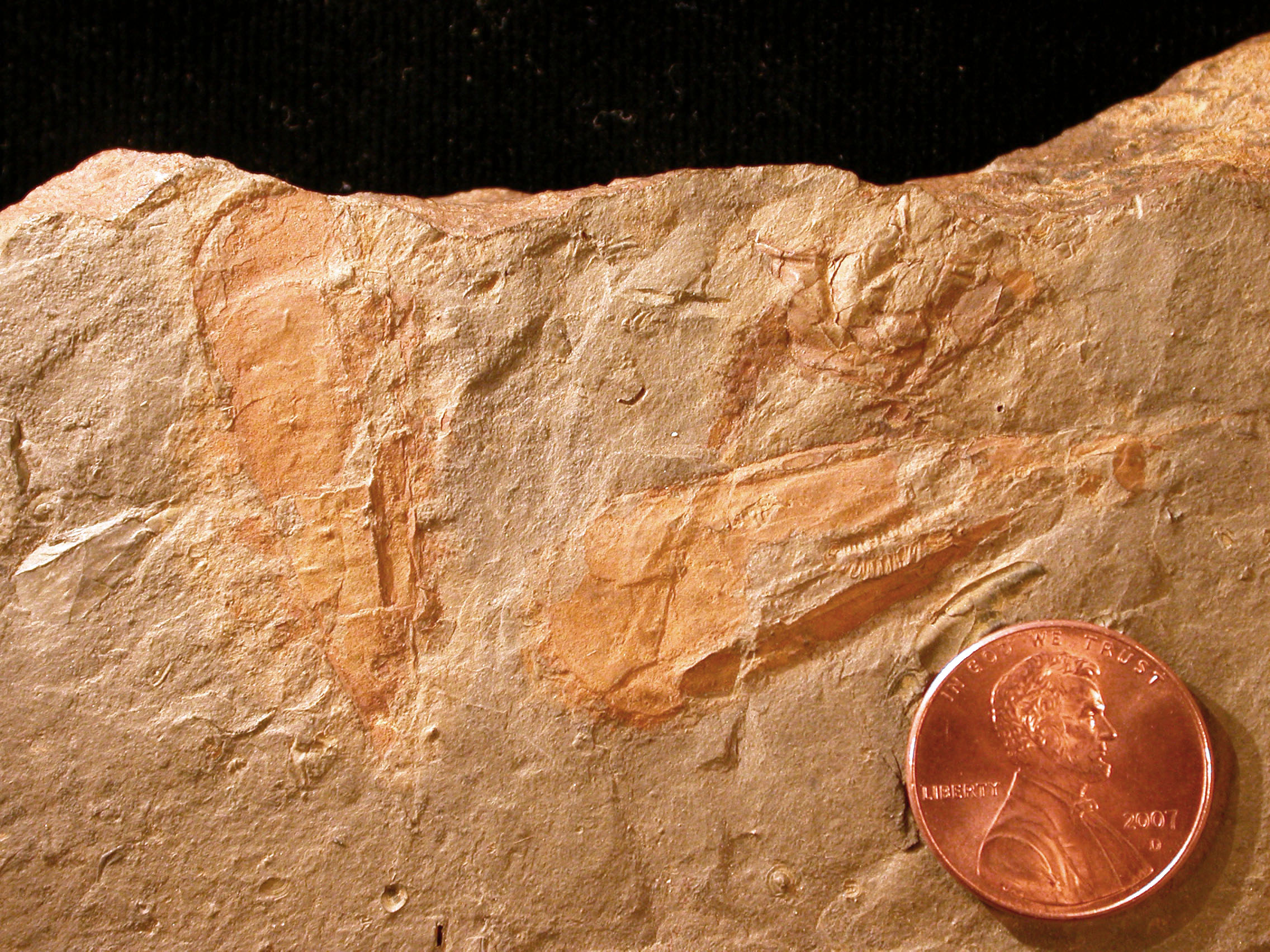
- Hyolithes cerops, Spence Shale, Idaho (Middle Cambrian)

Scientific classification
- Kingdom: Animalia
- Superphylum: Lophotrochozoa
- Class: †Hyolitha; Marek, 1963

Orders
- See text.

= Hyolitha =

Hyolitha Temporal range: Fortunian to end Permian, 536–251.9 Ma

Palaeozoic lophophorates with small conical shells

Hyoliths are an extinct group of invertebrates with small conical shells, known from fossils from the Palaeozoic era. They are at least considered lophotrochozoans, possibly being lophophorates, a group which includes the brachiopods (hyoliths may even be brachiopods themselves), while others consider them as being basal lophotrochozoans, or even molluscs.

== Morphology ==
The shell of a hyolith is typically one to four centimeters in length, triangular or elliptical in cross section. Some species have rings or stripes. It comprises two parts: the main conical shell (previously referred to as a 'conch') and a cap-like operculum. Some also had two curved supports known as helens They are calcareous – probably aragonitic All of these structures grew by marginal accretion.

=== Shell microstructure ===
The orthothecid shell has an internal layer with a microstructure of transverse bundles, and an external layer comprising longitudinal bundles.

=== Helens ===
Some hyoliths had helens, long structures that taper as they coil gently in a logarithmic spiral in a ventral direction. The helens had an organic-rich central core surrounded by concentric laminae of calcite. They grew by the addition of new material at their base, on the cavity side, leaving growth lines.

They were originally described by Walcott as separate fossils under the genus name Helenia (Walcott's wife was named Helena and his daughter Helen); Bruce Runnegar adopted the name helen when they were recognized as part of the hyolith organism. Encrusting organisms have been found on helens, and also on both sides of the main shell, all of which are therefore supposed to have been raised above the sea bed. The helens have been interpreted as props that supported the feeding organ, the lophophore, above the sea bed.

=== Operculum ===
The operculum closes over the aperture of the shell, leaving (in hyolithids) two gaps through which the helens can protrude. It comprises two parts: the cardinal shield, a flat region at the top of the shell; and the conical shield, the bottom part, which is more conical. The inside of the shell bears a number of protrusions, notably the dorsal cardinal processes and the radially-arranged clavicles.

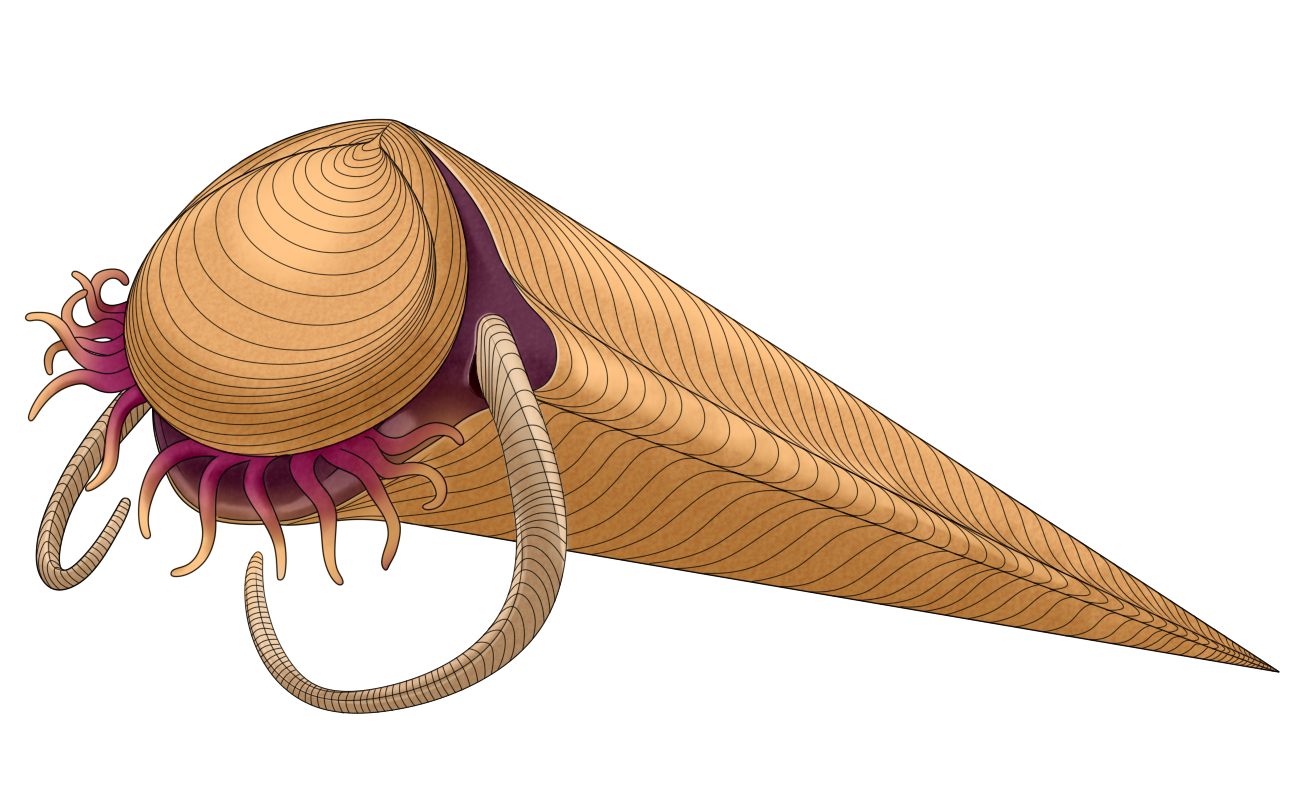
Reconstruction of Haplophrentis, hyolith with known soft tissue

=== Soft tissues ===
The soft tissues of the mid-Cambrian hyolith Haplophrentis, from the Burgess Shale and Spence Shale Lagerstätten include a gullwing-shaped band below the operculum. This band is interpreted as a lophophore, a feeding organ with a central mouth; it bears 12 to 16 tentacles. From the mouth a muscular pharynx leads to a gut, which loops back and exits beyond the crown of tentacles. Next to the gut are a pair of large kidney-shaped organs of uncertain nature. Under the operculum are muscles. The thin body wall circumscribes the interior of the shell, except the apex. Preserved intestines have been described from the Ordovician hyolith Girvanolithes thraivensis.

== Taxonomy ==
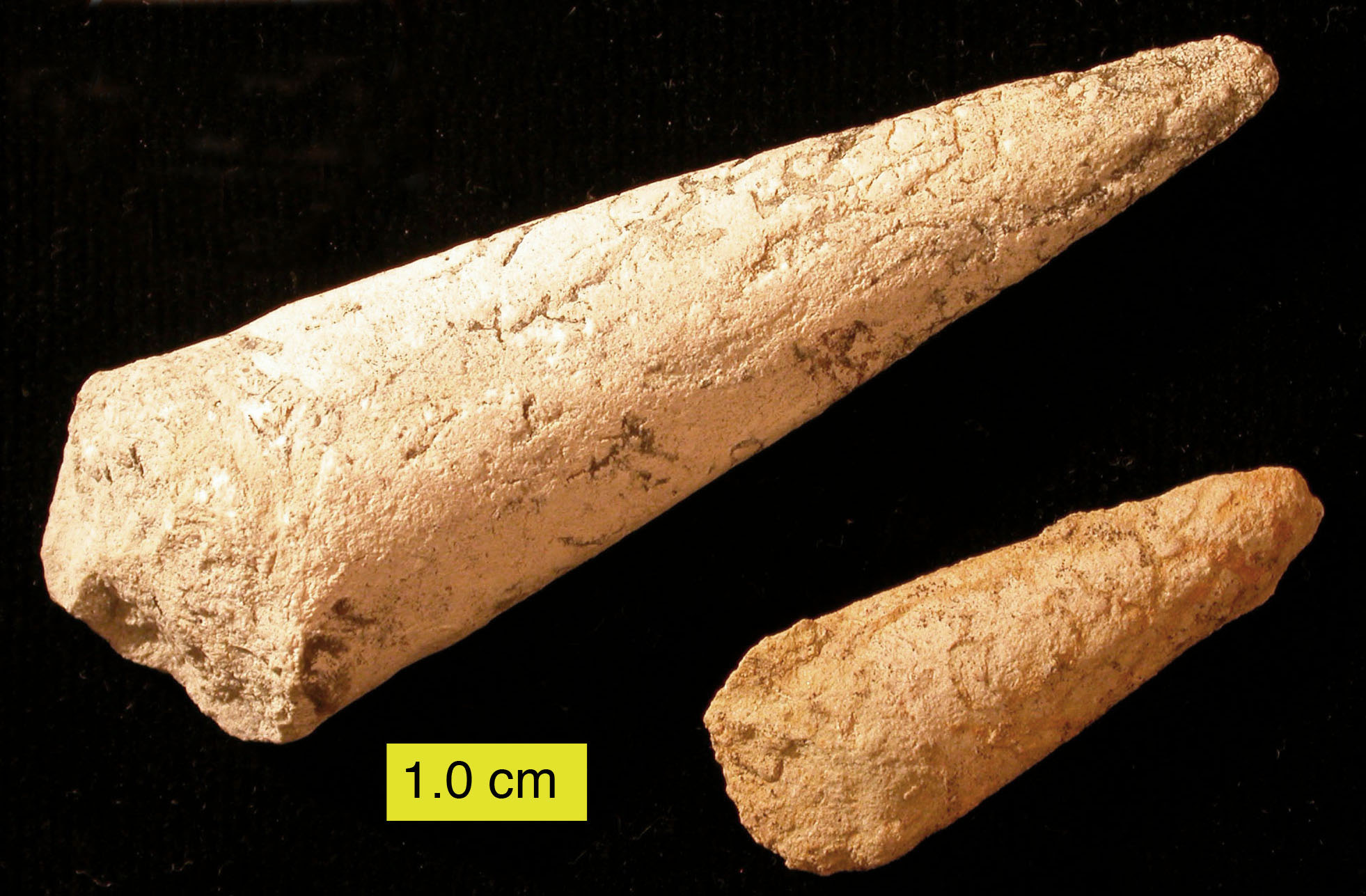
Hyoliths from the Middle Ordovician of northern Estonia; these are internal molds.

The hyoliths are divided into two orders, the Hyolithida and the Orthothecida.

Hyolitha have dorso-ventrally differentiated opercula, with the ventral surface of the shell extending forwards to form a shelf termed the ligula.

The Orthothecida are somewhat more problematic, and probably contain a number of non-hyoliths simply because they are so difficult to identify with confidence, especially if their operculum is absent. They have a straight (planar) opening, sometimes with a notch on the bottom side, and sealed with an operculum that has no ligula, clavicles, furrow or rooflets.

Hyptiotheca is an unusual hyolithid, in that it lacks clavicles.

Orthothecids fall into two groups: one, the orthothecida sensu stricto, is kidney or heart shaped in cross-section due to a longitudinal groove on its ventral surface, and its opercula bear cardinal processes; the other has a rounded cross-section and often lacks cardinal processes, making them difficult to distinguish from other cornet-shaped calcareous organisms. All were sessile and benthic; some may have been filter feeders.

== Phylogenetic position ==
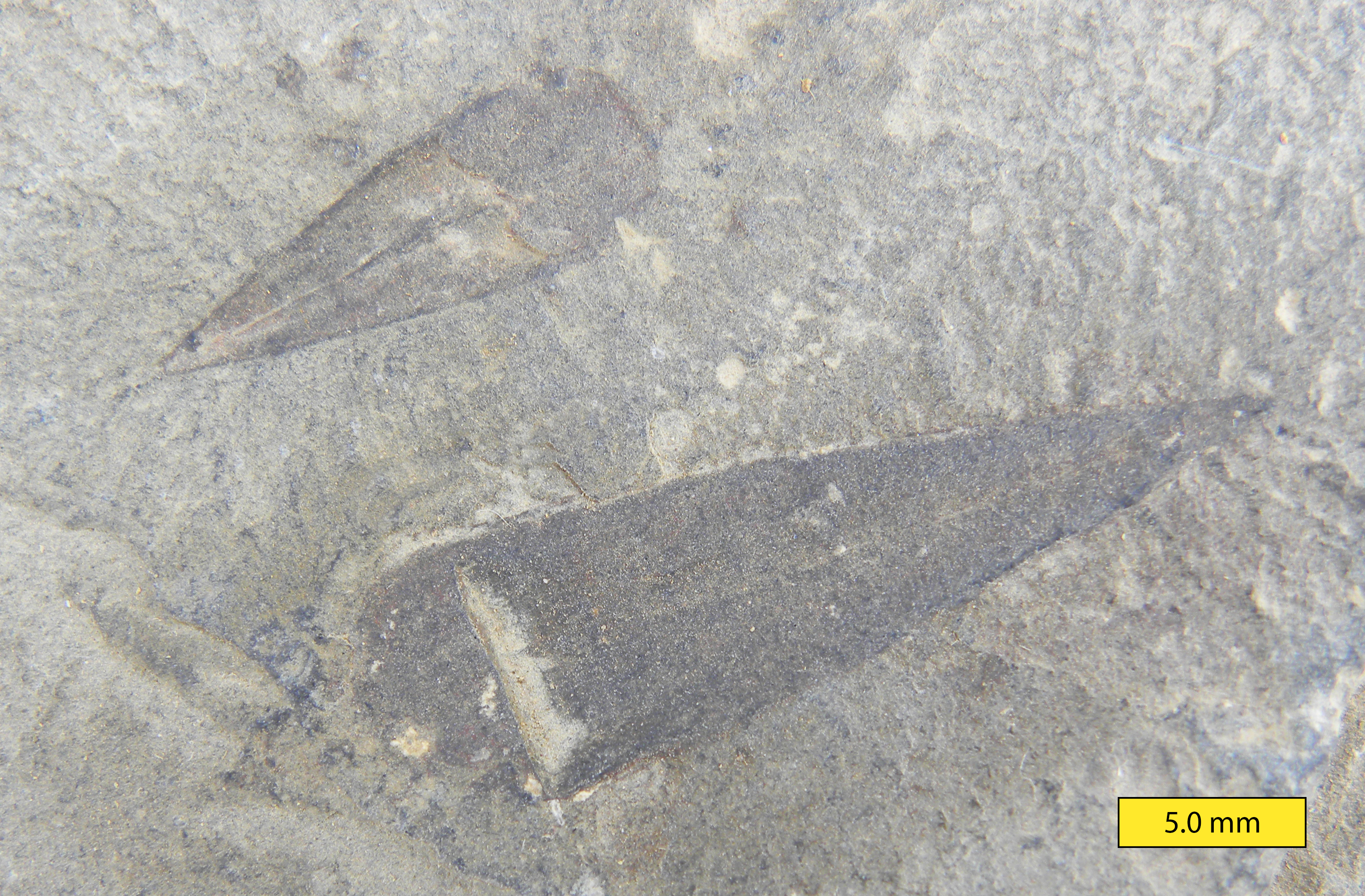
Haplophrentis carinatus from the Stephen Formation, Burgess Shale (Middle Cambrian), Burgess Pass, British Columbia, Canada.

Because hyoliths are extinct and do not obviously resemble any extant group, it has long been unclear which living group they are most closely related to. They have been supposed to be molluscs; or to belong to their own phylum in an unspecified part of the phylogenetic tree. Their grade of organization was historically considered to be of the 'mollusc-annelid-sipunculid' level, consistent with a Lophotrochozoan affinity, and comparison was primarily drawn with the molluscs or sipunculids. Older studies (predating the Lophotrochozoan concept) consider hyoliths to represent a stem lineage of the clade containing (Mollusca + Annelida + Arthropoda).

A secure classification at last became possible in 2017, on the basis of Burgess Shale specimens that preserve lophophores. This diagnostic characteristic demonstrates an affinity with the Lophophorata, a group that contains Brachiopoda, Bryozoa (perhaps), and Phoronida.

A study in 2019 estimated that hyoliths are more likely to be basal members of the lophotrochozoans rather than lophophorates. Meanwhile, a study in 2020 instead concluded that hyoliths belong to Mollusca, as did a different study in 2022.

== Ecology ==
Hyolithids were benthic (bottom-dwellers), using their helens as stilts to hold the opening of their shells above the sea floor. Orthothecids did not have helens, but are presumed to have been sessile and benthic.

In the Cambrian, their global distribution shows no sign of provinciality, suggesting a long-lived planktonic larval life stage (reflected by their protoconchs); but by the Ordovician distinct assemblages were becoming evident.

Some orthothecids are preserved in vertical [life] orientation, suggesting a sessile suspension-feeding habit; hyolithids tend to be flat on the bottom, and their shape and the occurrence of epibionts are consistent with a sessile suspension feeding habit via orientation relative to passive currents.

== Occurrence ==
The first hyolith fossils appeared about 540 million years ago in the Purella antiqua Zone of the Nemakit-Daldynian Stage of Siberia and in its analogue the Paragloborilus subglobosus–Purella squamulosa Zone of the Meishucunian Stage of China. Hyolith abundance and diversity attain a maximum in the Cambrian, followed by a progressive decline up to their Permian extinction.

== Similar organisms ==
Due to the simple shape of their shell, hyoliths have been something of a wastebasket taxon, and organisms originally interpreted as hyoliths have sometimes later been recognized as something else – as for example in the case of the cnidarian-like Glossolites and Palaeoconotuba.

== See also ==
- List of hyolith genera
