= Phytomyptera ruficornis =

Scientific classification
- Kingdom: Animalia
- Phylum: Arthropoda
- Class: Insecta
- Order: Diptera
- Family: Tachinidae
- Subfamily: Tachininae
- Tribe: Graphogastrini
- Genus: Phytomyptera
- Species: P. ruficornis

Binomial name
- Phytomyptera ruficornis (Greene, 1934)

Synonyms
- Schizotachina ruficornis Greene, 1934

Species of fly

Phytomyptera ruficornis is a species of bristle fly in the family Tachinidae.

== Distribution ==
Canada, United States.
