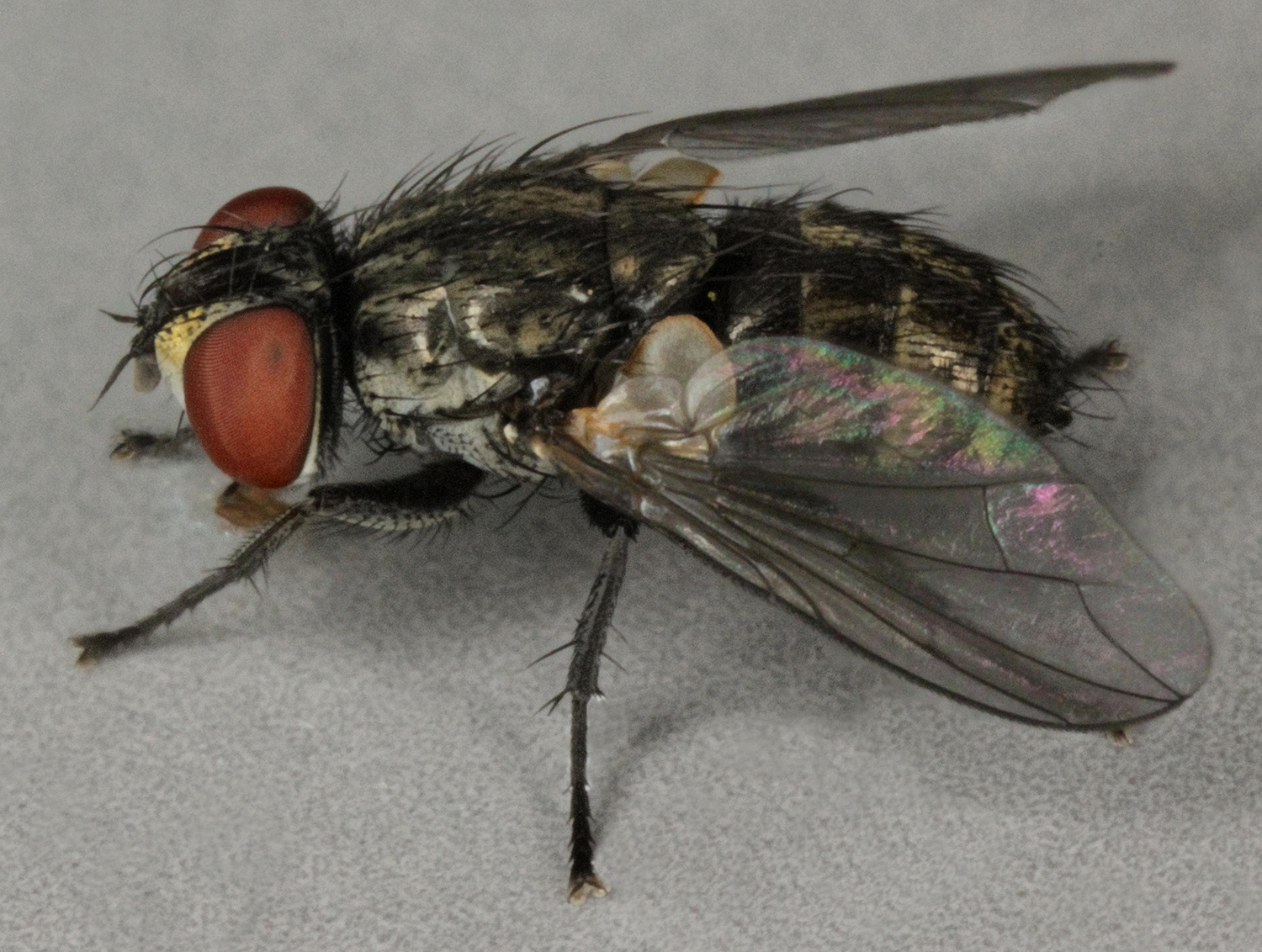

Scientific classification
- Kingdom: Animalia
- Phylum: Arthropoda
- Clade: Pancrustacea
- Class: Insecta
- Order: Diptera
- Family: Tachinidae
- Subfamily: Tachininae
- Tribe: Graphogastrini
- Genus: Phytomyptera
- Species: P. cingulata

Binomial name
- Phytomyptera cingulata (Robineau-Desvoidy, 1830)

Synonyms
- Actia cingulata Robineau-Desvoidy, 1830; Tachina perpingens Walker, 1853

= Phytomyptera cingulata =

Species of fly

Phytomyptera cingulata is a European species of fly in the family Tachinidae.
