= Ancistrophora =

Ancistrophora may refer to:

- Ancistrophora (fly), a genus of flies in the family Tachinidae
- Ancistrophora (plant), a genus of plants in the family Asteraceae, currently considered a synonym of Verbesina
