= Graphogaster brunnescens =

Scientific classification
- Kingdom: Animalia
- Phylum: Arthropoda
- Clade: Pancrustacea
- Class: Insecta
- Order: Diptera
- Family: Tachinidae
- Subfamily: Tachininae
- Tribe: Graphogastrini
- Genus: Graphogaster
- Species: G. brunnescens

Binomial name
- Graphogaster brunnescens Villeneuve, 1907

Species of fly

Graphogaster brunnescens is a European species of fly in the family Tachinidae.

== Distribution ==
Turkmenistan, British Isles, Czech Republic, Poland, Romania, Denmark, Sweden, Bulgaria, France, Germany, Netherlands, Switzerland, Russia.
