= Phytomyptera minutissima =

Scientific classification
- Kingdom: Animalia
- Phylum: Arthropoda
- Clade: Pancrustacea
- Class: Insecta
- Order: Diptera
- Family: Tachinidae
- Subfamily: Tachininae
- Tribe: Graphogastrini
- Genus: Phytomyptera
- Species: P. minutissima

Binomial name
- Phytomyptera minutissima (Zetterstedt, 1844)

Synonyms
- Tachina minutissima Zetterstedt, 1844; Craspedothrix vivipara Brauer & von Bergenstamm, 1893

Species of fly

Phytomyptera minutissima is a European species of fly in the family Tachinidae.

== Distribution ==
British Isles, Czech Republic, Denmark, Finland, Norway, Sweden, Italy, Spain, Austria, France, Germany, Netherlands, Switzerland, Russia.
