= Phytomyptera flavipes =

Scientific classification
- Kingdom: Animalia
- Phylum: Arthropoda
- Class: Insecta
- Order: Diptera
- Family: Tachinidae
- Subfamily: Tachininae
- Tribe: Graphogastrini
- Genus: Phytomyptera
- Species: P. flavipes

Binomial name
- Phytomyptera flavipes (Reinhard, 1943)

Synonyms
- Lispideosoma flavipes Reinhard, 1943

Species of fly

Phytomyptera flavipes is a species of bristle fly in the family Tachinidae.

== Distribution ==
Canada, United States.
