= Phytomyptera vitinervis =

Scientific classification
- Kingdom: Animalia
- Phylum: Arthropoda
- Class: Insecta
- Order: Diptera
- Family: Tachinidae
- Subfamily: Tachininae
- Tribe: Graphogastrini
- Genus: Phytomyptera
- Species: P. vitinervis

Binomial name
- Phytomyptera vitinervis (Thompson, 1911)

Synonyms
- Schizotachina vitinervis Thompson, 1911

Species of fly

Phytomyptera vitinervis is a species of bristle fly in the family Tachinidae.

== Distribution ==
Canada, United States.
