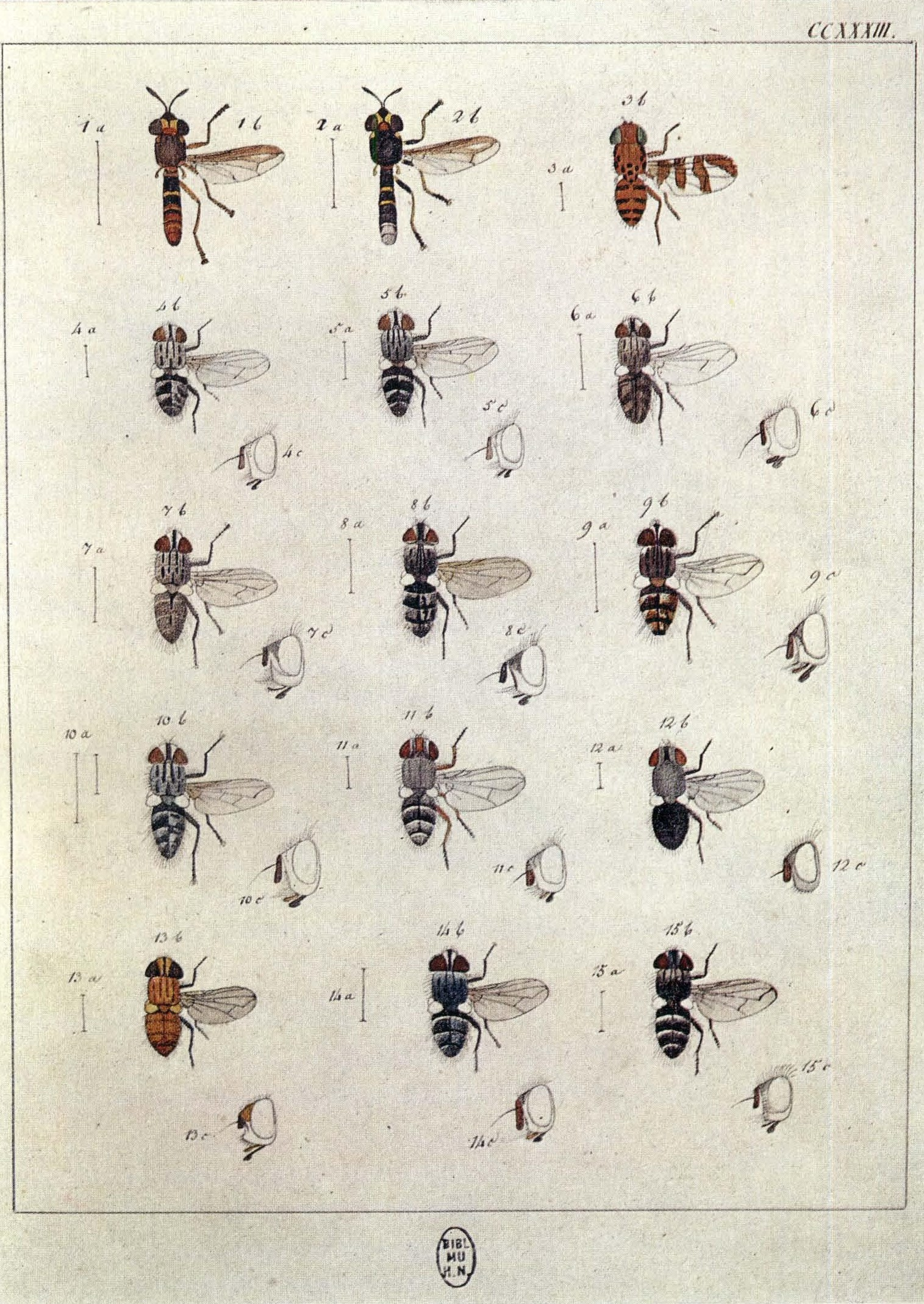
- Illustration in Johann Wilhelm Meigen Europäischen Zweiflügeligen Figure 12

Scientific classification
- Kingdom: Animalia
- Phylum: Arthropoda
- Clade: Pancrustacea
- Class: Insecta
- Order: Diptera
- Family: Tachinidae
- Subfamily: Tachininae
- Tribe: Graphogastrini
- Genus: Phytomyptera
- Species: P. nigrina

Binomial name
- Phytomyptera nigrina (Meigen, 1824)

Synonyms
- Tachina nigrina Meigen, 1824; Phytomyptera nitidiventris Rondani, 1845; Phytomyptera unicolor Rondani, 1865; Phytomyptera vaccinii Sintenis, 1897

= Phytomyptera nigrina =

Species of fly

Phytomyptera nigrina is a European species of fly in the family Tachinidae.

== Distribution ==
Tajikistan, British Isles, Czech Republic, Hungary, Lithuania, Poland, Romania, Slovakia, Ukraine, Denmark, Finland, Norway, Sweden, Andorra, Bulgaria, Croatia, Greece, Italy, Portugal, Spain, Austria, France, Germany, Netherlands, Switzerland, Israel, Mongolia, Canary Islands, Russia, Transcaucasia.
