= Camposodes =

Scientific classification
- Kingdom: Animalia
- Phylum: Arthropoda
- Clade: Pancrustacea
- Class: Insecta
- Order: Diptera
- Family: Tachinidae
- Subfamily: Tachininae
- Tribe: Graphogastrini
- Genus: Camposodes; Cortés, 1967

Type species
- Camposodes evanescens Cortés, 1967

Genus of flies

Camposodes is a genus of flies in the family Tachinidae.

== Species ==
- Camposodes evanescens Cortés, 1967

== Distribution ==
Argentina, Chile.
