= Austrophytomyptera =

Scientific classification
- Kingdom: Animalia
- Phylum: Arthropoda
- Class: Insecta
- Order: Diptera
- Family: Tachinidae
- Subfamily: Tachininae
- Tribe: Graphogastrini
- Genus: Austrophytomyptera; Blanchard, 1962

Type species
- Austrophytomyptera malloi Blanchard, 1962

Genus of flies

Austrophytomyptera is a genus of flies in the family Tachinidae.

== Species ==
- Austrophytomyptera malloi Blanchard, 1962

== Distribution ==
Argentina.
