= Clastoneuriopsis =

Scientific classification
- Kingdom: Animalia
- Phylum: Arthropoda
- Class: Insecta
- Order: Diptera
- Family: Tachinidae
- Subfamily: Tachininae
- Tribe: Graphogastrini
- Genus: Clastoneuriopsis; Reinhard, 1939

Type species
- Clastoneuriopsis meralis Reinhard, 1939

Genus of flies

Clastoneuriopsis is a genus of flies in the family Tachinidae.

== Species ==
- Clastoneuriopsis magallanica Cortés, 1986
- Clastoneuriopsis meralis Reinhard, 1939
