= Sarrorhina =

Scientific classification
- Kingdom: Animalia
- Phylum: Arthropoda
- Clade: Pancrustacea
- Class: Insecta
- Order: Diptera
- Family: Tachinidae
- Subfamily: Tachininae
- Tribe: Graphogastrini
- Genus: Sarrorhina; Villeneuve, 1936

Type species
- Sarrorhina pupilla Villeneuve, 1936

Synonyms
- Sarrhorina Crosskey, 1980

Genus of flies

Sarrorhina is a genus of flies in the family Tachinidae.

== Species ==
- Sarrorhina pupilla Villeneuve, 1936

== Distribution ==
South Africa.
