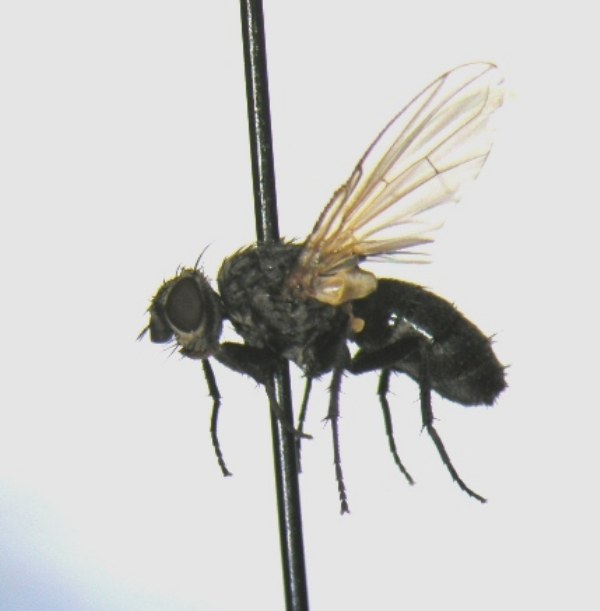

Scientific classification
- Kingdom: Animalia
- Phylum: Arthropoda
- Clade: Pancrustacea
- Class: Insecta
- Order: Diptera
- Family: Tachinidae
- Subfamily: Tachininae
- Tribe: Graphogastrini
- Genus: Phytomyptera
- Species: P. zonella

Binomial name
- Phytomyptera zonella (Zetterstedt, 1844)

Synonyms
- Tachina zonella Zetterstedt, 1844; Thryptocera exaculeata Pandellé, 1894

= Phytomyptera zonella =

Species of fly

Phytomyptera zonella is a European species of fly in the family Tachinidae.

== Distribution ==
British Isles, Czech Republic, Estonia, Poland, Slovakia, Denmark, Finland, Norway, Sweden, Italy, Austria, Belgium, France, Germany, Switzerland, Russia, China.
