= Graphogaster =

Scientific classification
- Kingdom: Animalia
- Phylum: Arthropoda
- Clade: Pancrustacea
- Class: Insecta
- Order: Diptera
- Family: Tachinidae
- Subfamily: Tachininae
- Tribe: Graphogastrini
- Genus: Graphogaster; Rondani, 1868

Synonyms
- Anurogyna Brauer & von Berganstamm, 1889; Neopsalidopteryx Brooks, 1942; Paracyrillia Strobl, 1893; Parahyria Bischof, 1900; Psalidopteryx Townsend, 1916; Pseudalophora Portschinsky, 1881

Genus of flies

Graphogaster is a genus of flies in the family Tachinidae.

== Species ==
- Graphogaster alaskensis (Brooks, 1942)
- Graphogaster alberta (Curran, 1927)
- Graphogaster altaica Mesnil, 1973
- Graphogaster bohdani Draber-Monko, 1965
- Graphogaster brunnea (Brooks, 1942)
- Graphogaster brunnescens Villeneuve, 1907
- Graphogaster buccata Herting, 1971
- Graphogaster deceptor (Curran, 1927)
- Graphogaster dispar (Brauer & von Berganstamm, 1889)
- Graphogaster dorsalis (Coquillett, 1902)
- Graphogaster fuscisquamis (Brooks, 1942)
- Graphogaster grandis (Brooks, 1942)
- Graphogaster inflata (Bischof, 1900)
- Graphogaster macdunnoughi (Brooks, 1942)
- Graphogaster nigrescens Herting, 1971
- Graphogaster nigrisquamata Tschorsnig, 1989
- Graphogaster nuda (Brooks, 1942)
- Graphogaster orientalis (Brooks, 1942)
- Graphogaster parvipalpis Kugler, 1974
- Graphogaster pollinosa (Brooks, 1942)
- Graphogaster pseudonuda (Brooks, 1942)
- Graphogaster psilocorsiphaga (Brooks, 1942)
- Graphogaster rostrata Herting, 1973
- Graphogaster slossonae (Townsend, 1916)
- Graphogaster vestitus Rondani, 1868
