= Trichschizotachina =

Scientific classification
- Kingdom: Animalia
- Phylum: Arthropoda
- Class: Insecta
- Order: Diptera
- Family: Tachinidae
- Subfamily: Tachininae
- Tribe: Graphogastrini
- Genus: Trichschizotachina; Townsend, 1935

Type species
- Trichschizotachina trinitas Townsend, 1935

Synonyms
- Trichoschizotachina Evenhuis et al. 2015

Genus of flies

Trichschizotachina is a genus of flies in the family Tachinidae.

== Species ==
- Trichschizotachina trinitas Townsend, 1935

== Distribution ==
Trinidad and Tobago.
