= Voriella =

Scientific classification
- Kingdom: Animalia
- Phylum: Arthropoda
- Class: Insecta
- Order: Diptera
- Family: Tachinidae
- Subfamily: Tachininae
- Tribe: Graphogastrini
- Genus: Voriella; Malloch, 1930

Type species
- Voriella uniseta Malloch, 1930

Synonyms
- Tongamyia Mesnil, 1953

Genus of flies

Voriella is a genus of flies in the family Tachinidae.

== Species ==
- Voriella cinerella (Mesnil, 1953)
- Voriella setiventris Malloch, 1935
- Voriella uniseta Malloch, 1930
