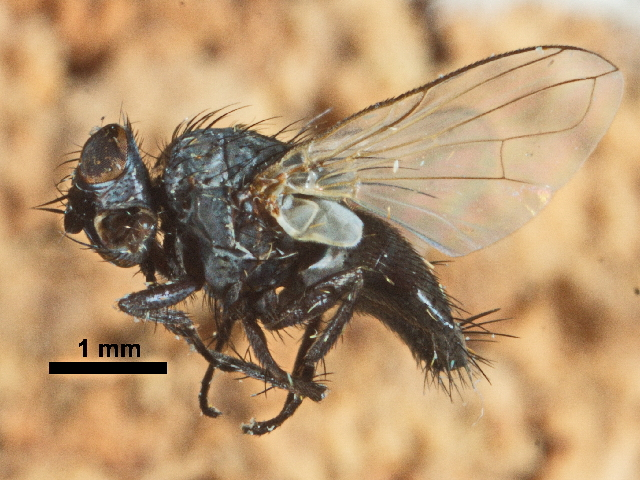
- Heraultia albipennis

Scientific classification
- Kingdom: Animalia
- Phylum: Arthropoda
- Clade: Pancrustacea
- Class: Insecta
- Order: Diptera
- Family: Tachinidae
- Subfamily: Tachininae
- Tribe: Graphogastrini
- Genus: Heraultia; Villeneuve, 1920

Type species
- Heraultia albipennis Villeneuve, 1920

= Heraultia =

Genus of flies

Heraultia is a genus of flies in the family Tachinidae.

== Species ==
- Heraultia albipennis Villeneuve, 1920
