= Sisyphomyia =

Scientific classification
- Kingdom: Animalia
- Phylum: Arthropoda
- Clade: Pancrustacea
- Class: Insecta
- Order: Diptera
- Family: Tachinidae
- Subfamily: Tachininae
- Tribe: Graphogastrini
- Genus: Sisyphomyia; Townsend, 1927

Genus of flies

Sisyphomyia is a genus of flies in the family Tachinidae.

== Species ==
- Sisyphomyia pygmaea Townsend, 1927

== Distribution ==
Brazil.
