= Planomyia =

Scientific classification
- Kingdom: Animalia
- Phylum: Arthropoda
- Class: Insecta
- Order: Diptera
- Family: Tachinidae
- Subfamily: Tachininae
- Tribe: Graphogastrini
- Genus: Planomyia; Aldrich, 1934

Type species
- Planomyia browni Aldrich, 1934

Genus of flies

Planomyia is a genus of flies in the family Tachinidae.

== Species ==
- Planomyia browni Aldrich, 1934
