= Haywardimyia =

Scientific classification
- Kingdom: Animalia
- Phylum: Arthropoda
- Class: Insecta
- Order: Diptera
- Family: Tachinidae
- Subfamily: Tachininae
- Tribe: Graphogastrini
- Genus: Haywardimyia; Blanchard, 1955

Type species
- Haywardimyia brevicornis Blanchard, 1955

Synonyms
- Haywardiamyia Guimarães 1971

Genus of flies

Haywardimyia is a genus of flies in the family Tachinidae.

== Species ==
- Haywardimyia brevicornis Blanchard, 1955

== Distribution ==
Argentina.
