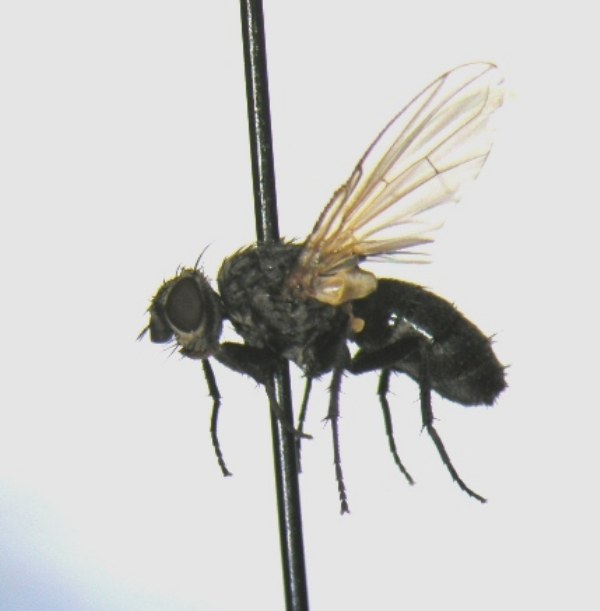
- Phytomyptera zonella

Scientific classification
- Kingdom: Animalia
- Phylum: Arthropoda
- Clade: Pancrustacea
- Class: Insecta
- Order: Diptera
- Family: Tachinidae
- Subfamily: Tachininae
- Tribe: Graphogastrini
- Genus: Phytomyptera; Rondani, 1845

Synonyms
- Apheloglutus Greene, 1934; Camposodes Cortés, 1967; Elfia Robineau-Desvoidy, 1850; Goliathocera Townsend, 1915; Gwenda Richter, 1977; Irwinia Cortés, 1967; Lispidea Coquillett, 1895; Lispideosoma Reinhard, 1943; Lophosiocera Townsend, 1916; Microphytomyptera Townsend, 1927; Nephopteropsis Townsend, 1916; Phasiostoma Townsend, 1915; Phitomyptera Lioy, 1864; Phylacteropoda Townsend, 1916; Phytomyzoptera Bezzi, 1906; Plectops Coquillett, 1897; Schizactia Townsend, 1926; Schizotachina Walker, 1853

= Phytomyptera =

Genus of flies

Phytomyptera is a genus of flies in the family Tachinidae.

== Species ==
- Phytomyptera abnormis (Stein, 1924)
- Phytomyptera aenea (Coquillett, 1895)
- Phytomyptera amplicornis (James, 1955)
- Phytomyptera amuricola (Richter, 1992)
- Phytomyptera aristalis (Townsend, 1915)
- Phytomyptera atra (Aldrich, 1934)
- Phytomyptera aurantia Barraclough, 1986
- Phytomyptera aurocrista (Barraclough, 1986)
- Phytomyptera biseta (Barraclough, 1986)
- Phytomyptera bohemica (Kramer, 1907)
- Phytomyptera canella (Herting, 1967)
- Phytomyptera cingulata (Robineau-Desvoidy, 1830)
- Phytomyptera clavapalpa (Barraclough, 1986)
- Phytomyptera coelicola (Richter, 1977)
- Phytomyptera convecta (Walker, 1853)
- Phytomyptera cornuta (Reinhard, 1931)
- Phytomyptera curriei (Townsend, 1916)
- Phytomyptera erisma (Reinhard, 1962)
- Phytomyptera erotema (Reinhard, 1958)
- Phytomyptera evanescens (Cortés, 1967)
- Phytomyptera exul (Walker, 1853)
- Phytomyptera flavipes (Reinhard, 1943)
- Phytomyptera frontalis (Aldrich, 1934)
- Phytomyptera gracilariae (Hering, 1926)
- Phytomyptera interrupta (Aldrich, 1934)
- Phytomyptera johnsoni (Coquillett, 1897)
- Phytomyptera lacteipennis (Villeneuve, 1934)
- Phytomyptera latifrons (Greene, 1934)
- Phytomyptera longiarista O'Hara & Cerretti, 2016
- Phytomyptera longicornis (Coquillett, 1902)
- Phytomyptera lunata Barraclough, 1986
- Phytomyptera maurokara (Barraclough, 1986)
- Phytomyptera mediaposita Barraclough, 1986
- Phytomyptera melissopodis (Coquillett, 1897)
- Phytomyptera minuta (Townsend, 1927)
- Phytomyptera minutissima (Zetterstedt, 1844)
- Phytomyptera nigra (Brooks, 1945)
- Phytomyptera nigrina (Meigen, 1824)
- Phytomyptera nigroaenea (Herting, 1963)
- Phytomyptera pallipes Mesnil, 1963
- Phytomyptera palpigera (Coquillett, 1895)
- Phytomyptera pamirica (Richter, 1977)
- Phytomyptera peruviana (Townsend, 1929)
- Phytomyptera pollinosa (Cortés, 1967)
- Phytomyptera pruinosa (Malloch, 1927)
- Phytomyptera riedeli (Villeneuve, 1930)
- Phytomyptera rotundata (Aldrich, 1934)
- Phytomyptera ruficornis (Greene, 1934)
- Phytomyptera setigera (Thomson, 1869)
- Phytomyptera spinacrista Barraclough, 1986
- Phytomyptera spinosovirilia (Barraclough, 1986)
- Phytomyptera stackelbergi Mesnil, 1963
- Phytomyptera tarsalis (Coquillett, 1895)
- Phytomyptera triangularis (Aldrich, 1934)
- Phytomyptera triste (Reinhard, 1961)
- Phytomyptera usitata (Coquillett, 1897)
- Phytomyptera verna Richter, 1993
- Phytomyptera vibrissata (Aldrich, 1934)
- Phytomyptera viridis (Reinhard, 1967)
- Phytomyptera vitinervis (Thompson, 1911)
- Phytomyptera walleyi Brooks, 1945
- Phytomyptera yemenensis Barraclough, 1986
- Phytomyptera zonella (Zetterstedt, 1844)
