= Ancistrophora (fly) =

Scientific classification
- Kingdom: Animalia
- Phylum: Arthropoda
- Class: Insecta
- Order: Diptera
- Family: Tachinidae
- Subfamily: Tachininae
- Tribe: Graphogastrini
- Genus: Ancistrophora; Schiner, 1866

Type species
- Ancistrophora mikii Schiner, 1866

Genus of flies

Ancistrophora is a genus of flies in the family Tachinidae.

== Species ==
- Ancistrophora mikii Schiner, 1866

== Distribution ==
Italy, Austria, France, Switzerland, Russia.
