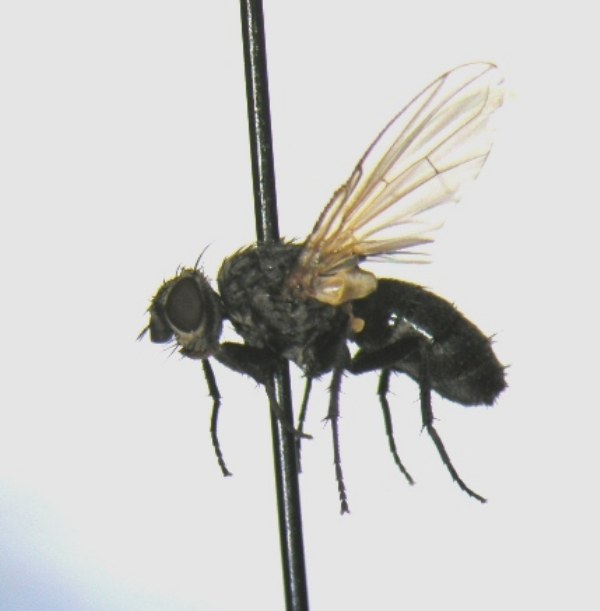
- Phytomyptera zonella

Scientific classification
- Kingdom: Animalia
- Phylum: Arthropoda
- Class: Insecta
- Order: Diptera
- Family: Tachinidae
- Subfamily: Tachininae
- Tribe: Graphogastrini

Synonyms
- Neaerini Andersen, 1988

= Graphogastrini =

Tribe of flies

Graphogastrini is a tribe of flies in the family Tachinidae.

== Genera ==
- Ancistrophora Schiner, 1865
- Austrophytomyptera Blanchard, 1962
- Camposodes Cortés, 1967
- Clastoneura Aldrich, 1934
- Clastoneuriopsis Reinhard, 1939
- Graphogaster Rondani, 1868
- Haywardimyia Blanchard, 1955
- Heraultia Villeneuve, 1920
- Mayoschizocera Townsend, 1927
- Neocraspedothrix Townsend, 1927
- Phytomyptera Rondani, 1845
- Planomyia Aldrich, 1934
- Plectopsis Townsend, 1927
- Sarrorhina Villeneuve, 1936
- Sisyphomyia Townsend, 1927
- Trichschizotachina Townsend, 1935
- Voriella Malloch, 1930
