= 2021 in paleomalacology =

This list of fossil molluscs described in 2021 is a list of new taxa of fossil molluscs that were described during the year 2021, as well as other significant discoveries and events related to molluscan paleontology that occurred in 2021.

== Ammonites ==
=== New taxa ===
Name	Novelty	Status	Authors	Age	Type locality	Country	Notes	Images
Abichites infirmis	Sp. nov	Valid	Korn & Hairapetian in Korn et al.	Permian (Changhsingian)	Hambast Formation	Iran		
Abichites ovalis	Sp. nov	Valid	Korn & Hairapetian in Korn et al.	Permian (Changhsingian)	Hambast Formation	Iran		
Agathiceras iranicum	Sp. nov	Valid	Korn & Ghaderi in Korn et al.	Carboniferous-Permian boundary		Iran		
Alienisphinctes	Gen. et sp. nov	Valid	Énay & Mangold	Late Jurassic (Kimmeridgian)	Jubaila Formation	Saudi Arabia	A member of the family Ataxioceratidae. The type species is A. cavelieri.	
Amaltheus orientalis	Sp. nov	Valid	Nakada et al.	Early Jurassic (Pliensbachian)	Kuruma Group	Japan		
Arasella falcata	Sp. nov	Valid	Korn & Hairapetian in Korn et al.	Permian (Changhsingian)	Hambast Formation	Iran	An ammonite of uncertain placement, probably a member of the family Xenodiscidae.	
Arcestes lawsi	Sp. nov	Valid	Taylor, Guex & Lucas	Late Triassic (Rhaetian)	Gabbs Formation	United States (Nevada)		
Arnioceras ritterbushi	Sp. nov	Valid	Taylor & Guex	Early Jurassic (Sinemurian)	Sunrise Formation	United States (Nevada)		
Arnioceras sparsum	Sp. nov	Valid	Taylor & Guex	Early Jurassic (Sinemurian)	Sunrise Formation	United States (Nevada)		
Artyomites	Gen. et sp. nov	Valid	Smyshlyaeva & Zakharov	Early Triassic (Olenekian)		Russia	A member of the family Palaeophyllitidae. Genus includes new species A. antiquus.	
Aulatornoceras frenklerae	Sp. nov	Valid	Söte et al.	Devonian (Frasnian)	Sand Formation	Germany	A member of the family Tornoceratidae.	
Aulatornoceras steinhauseni	Sp. nov	Valid	Söte et al.	Devonian (Frasnian)	Sand Formation	Germany	A member of the family Tornoceratidae.	
Aulatornoceras ventrosulcatum	Sp. nov	Valid	Söte et al.	Devonian (Frasnian)	Sand Formation	Germany	A member of the family Tornoceratidae.	
Boucaulticeras hawthornensis	Sp. nov	Valid	Taylor & Guex	Early Jurassic (Sinemurian)	Sunrise Formation	United States (Nevada)	A member of the family Schlotheimiidae.	
Bullatimorphites szontaghi	Sp. nov	Valid	Galácz					
Caloceras avus	Sp. nov	Valid	Kment	Early Jurassic (Hettangian)				
Catrisimoceras	Gen. et comb. nov	Valid	Nannarone & Bilotta	Late Jurassic (Tithonian)		Italy	A member of Perisphinctoidea belonging to the family Simoceratidae and possibly to the subfamily Lytogyroceratinae. The type species is "Simoceras" catrianum Zittel (1870).	
Cheltonia howarthi	Sp. nov	Valid	Simms & Edmunds	Early Jurassic		United Kingdom		
Cibolaites petraschecki	Sp. nov	Valid	Wilmsen et al.	Late Cretaceous (Turonian)	Brießnitz Formation	Germany		
Clivotirolites	Gen. et 2 sp. nov	Valid	Korn & Hairapetian in Korn et al.	Permian (Changhsingian)	Hambast Formation	Iran	A member of the family Dzhulfitidae. The type species is C. decoratus; genus also includes C. petilus.	
Crassotornoceras hetzeneggeri	Sp. nov	Valid	Söte et al.	Devonian (Frasnian)	Sand Formation	Germany	A member of the family Tornoceratidae.	
Crassotornoceras nudum	Sp. nov	Valid	Söte et al.	Devonian (Frasnian)	Sand Formation	Germany	A member of the family Tornoceratidae.	
Crioceratites claveli	Sp. nov	In press	Bert et al.	Early Cretaceous (Hauterivian)	Vocontian Basin	France		
Didymoceras morozumii	Sp. nov	Valid	Misaki & Tsujino	Late Cretaceous (Campanian)	Hiketa Formation	Japan		
Dimorphodiscus	Gen. et sp. et comb. nov	Valid	Vermeulen et al.	Early Cretaceous (Barremian)		Algeria; Crimea; France	A member of the family Holcodiscidae. The type species is D. lerisae; genus also includes D. uhligi (Karakash, 1907), D. sayni (Joleaud, 1912) and "Metahoplites" postnodosum Vermeulen et al. (2017).	
Discoscaphites mullinaxorum	Sp. nov	Valid	Witts et al.	Late Cretaceous (Maastrichtian)	Corsicana Formation	United States (Texas)		
Domanikoceras martenbergense	Sp. nov	Valid	Korn	Devonian (Frasnian)		Germany	A member of the family Tornoceratidae.	
Dzhulfites brevisellatus	Sp. nov	Valid	Korn & Hairapetian in Korn et al.	Permian (Changhsingian)	Hambast Formation	Iran		
Eoasianites baghevangensis	Sp. nov	Valid	Korn & Ghaderi in Korn et al.	Carboniferous-Permian boundary		Iran		
Eoermoceras	Gen. et 2 sp. nov	Valid	Énay & Mangold	Middle Jurassic (Bajocian)	Dhruma Formation	Saudi Arabia	A member of the family Stephanoceratidae. The type species is E. glabrum; genus also includes new species E. angulatidomus.	
Eolytoceras rohrbachensis	Sp. nov	Valid	Kment	Early Jurassic (Hettangian)				
Esfahanites	Gen. et sp. nov	Valid	Korn & Hairapetian in Korn et al.	Permian (Changhsingian)	Hambast Formation	Iran	A member of the family Dzhulfitidae. The type species is E. armatus.	
Eutomoceras paladeji	Sp. nov	Valid	Tongtherm, Nabhitabhata & Tuanapaya	Triassic	Chaiburi Formation	Thailand	A member of the family Ceratitidae.	
Eutomoceras wantanae	Sp. nov	Valid	Tongtherm, Nabhitabhata & Tuanapaya	Triassic	Chaiburi Formation	Thailand	A member of the family Ceratitidae.	
Evopharciceras	Gen. et sp. et comb. nov	Valid	Korn & Bockwinkel	Devonian (Givetian)	Roteisenstein Formation	Germany; Morocco	A member of Agoniatitida belonging to the family Pharciceratidae. The type species is E. formosum; genus also includes "Pharciceras" evolvens Bockwinkel, Becker & Ebbighausen (2009).	
Extropharciceras metallicum	Sp. nov	Valid	Korn & Bockwinkel	Devonian (Givetian)	Roteisenstein Formation	Germany	A member of Agoniatitida belonging to the family Pharciceratidae.	
Galfettites orientalis	Sp. nov	Valid	Smyshlyaeva & Zakharov	Early Triassic (Olenekian)		Russia	A member of the family Galfettitidae.	
Glyptophiceras mirum	Sp. nov	Valid	Smyshlyaeva & Zakharov	Early Triassic (Olenekian)		Russia	A member of the family Xenoceltitidae.	
Gonioclymenia junggarensis	Sp. nov	In press	Zong, Becker & Ma	Devonian (Famennian)	Hongguleleng Formation	China		
Hadrothisbites hanwangensis	Sp. nov	In press	Mietto et al.	Late Triassic (Carnian)	Ma'antang Formation	China		
Holcodiscus pseudocaillaudi	Sp. nov	Valid	Vermeulen et al.	Early Cretaceous (Barremian)		France	A member of the family Holcodiscidae.	
Hulenites kitamurai	Sp. nov	In press	Matsukawa	Early Cretaceous (Aptian)	Todai Formation	Japan		
Inaptychoceras	Gen. et sp. nov	In press	Matsukawa	Early Cretaceous (Aptian)	Todai Formation	Japan	Genus includes new species I. koikei.	
Kislovodskoceras	Gen. et sp. nov	Valid	Polkovoy	Early Cretaceous (Aptian)		Russia	A member of the family Desmoceratidae. The type species is K. kislovodskense.	
Kurnubiella fallax	Sp. nov	Valid	Énay & Mangold	Middle Jurassic (Callovian)	Upper Dhruma Formation	Saudi Arabia	A member of the family Pachyceratidae.	
Laevisimoceras	Gen. et sp. nov	Valid	Nannarone & Bilotta	Late Jurassic (Tithonian)		Italy	A member of Perisphinctoidea belonging to the family Simoceratidae and the subfamily Parasimoceratinae. The type species is L. inornatum.	
Linguatornoceras asbeckense	Sp. nov	Valid	Korn	Devonian (Frasnian)		Germany	A member of the family Tornoceratidae.	
Lunupharciceras kochi	Sp. nov	Valid	Korn & Bockwinkel	Devonian (Givetian)	Roteisenstein Formation	Germany	A member of Agoniatitida belonging to the family Pharciceratidae.	
Lutites	Gen. et 5 sp. et comb. nov	Valid	Korn & Hairapetian in Korn et al.	Permian (Changhsingian)	Hambast Formation	Iran	A member of the family Dzhulfitidae. The type species is L. lyriformis; genus also includes new species L. alius, L. paucis, L. plicatus and L. profundus, as well as Alibashites stepanovi Korn & Ghaderi in Korn et al. (2015).	
Lytogyroceras tuberculatum	Sp. nov	Valid	Nannarone & Bilotta	Late Jurassic (Tithonian)		Italy	A member of Perisphinctoidea belonging to the family Simoceratidae and the subfamily Lytogyroceratinae.	
Maenioceras ornatum	Sp. nov	Valid	Korn & Bockwinkel	Devonian (Givetian)	Roteisenstein Formation	Germany	A member of Agoniatitida belonging to the family Maenioceratidae.	
Nejdia duartei	Sp. nov	Valid	Goy & Comas-Rengifo	Early Jurassic (Toarcian)			A member of the family Hildoceratidae.	
Obtusicostites gigas	Sp. nov	Valid	Énay & Mangold	Middle Jurassic (Callovian)	Upper Dhruma Formation	Saudi Arabia	A member of the family Perisphinctidae.	
Ophimullericeras	Gen. et sp. nov	Valid	Jenks et al.	Early Triassic	Dinwoody Formation	United States (Nevada)	A member of Ceratitida belonging to the group Meekocerataceae and the family Mullericeratidae. The type species is O. paullae.	
Pachyerymnoceras arabicum	Sp. nov	Valid	Énay & Mangold	Middle Jurassic (Callovian)	Tuwaiq Mountain Limestone Formation	Saudi Arabia	A member of the family Pachyceratidae.	
Pachyerymnoceras magnum	Sp. nov	Valid	Énay & Mangold	Middle Jurassic (Callovian)	Tuwaiq Mountain Limestone Formation	Saudi Arabia	A member of the family Pachyceratidae.	
Palaeophyllites mishkini	Sp. nov	Valid	Smyshlyaeva & Zakharov	Early Triassic (Olenekian)		Russia	A member of the family Palaeophyllitidae.	
Paracadoceras vasily	Sp. nov	Valid	Gulyaev in Gulyaev & Ippolitov	Middle Jurassic (Callovian)		Ukraine		
Paracochloceras nunminensis	Sp. nov	Valid	Taylor, Guex & Lucas	Late Triassic (Rhaetian)	Gabbs Formation	United States (Nevada)		
Parahoplites inaensis	Sp. nov	In press	Matsukawa	Early Cretaceous (Aptian)	Todai Formation	Japan		
Parasimoceras	Gen. et 2 sp. nov	Valid	Nannarone & Bilotta	Late Jurassic (Tithonian)		Italy	A member of Perisphinctoidea belonging to the family Simoceratidae and the subfamily Parasimoceratinae. The type species is P. venturii; genus also includes P. pseudostenonis.	
Paratirolites aduncus	Sp. nov	Valid	Korn & Hairapetian in Korn et al.	Permian (Changhsingian)	Hambast Formation	Iran		
Paratirolites baghukensis	Sp. nov	Valid	Korn & Hairapetian in Korn et al.	Permian (Changhsingian)	Hambast Formation	Iran		
Paratirolites lanceolobatus	Sp. nov	Valid	Korn & Hairapetian in Korn et al.	Permian (Changhsingian)	Hambast Formation	Iran		
Paratirolites robustus	Sp. nov	Valid	Korn & Hairapetian in Korn et al.	Permian (Changhsingian)	Hambast Formation	Iran		
Paratirolites rubens	Sp. nov	Valid	Korn & Hairapetian in Korn et al.	Permian (Changhsingian)	Hambast Formation	Iran		
Peripleurites gabbensis	Sp. nov	Valid	Taylor, Guex & Lucas	Late Triassic (Rhaetian)	Gabbs Formation	United States (Nevada)	A member of Choristocerataceae belonging to the family Rhabdoceratidae.	
Pharciceras beyrichi	Sp. nov	Valid	Korn & Bockwinkel	Devonian (Givetian)	Roteisenstein Formation	Germany	A member of Agoniatitida belonging to the family Pharciceratidae.	
Pharciceras ferrum	Sp. nov	Valid	Korn & Bockwinkel	Devonian (Givetian)	Roteisenstein Formation	Germany	A member of Agoniatitida belonging to the family Pharciceratidae.	
Pharciceras kruegeri	Sp. nov	Valid	Korn & Bockwinkel	Devonian (Givetian)	Roteisenstein Formation	Germany	A member of Agoniatitida belonging to the family Pharciceratidae.	
Placites heggi	Sp. nov	Valid	Taylor, Guex & Lucas	Late Triassic (Rhaetian)	Gabbs Formation	United States (Nevada)	A member of the family Gymnitidae.	
Planisimoceras	Gen. et sp. nov	Valid	Nannarone & Bilotta	Late Jurassic (Tithonian)		Italy	A member of Perisphinctoidea belonging to the family Simoceratidae and the subfamily Parasimoceratinae. The type species is P. costotuberculatum.	
Pluripharciceras ahlburgi	Sp. nov	Valid	Korn & Bockwinkel	Devonian (Givetian)	Roteisenstein Formation	Germany	A member of Agoniatitida belonging to the family Pharciceratidae.	
Pronjaites yolkinensis	Sp. nov	Valid	Mitta	Early Cretaceous		Russia		
Pseudogalfettites	Gen. et sp. nov	Valid	Smyshlyaeva & Zakharov	Early Triassic (Olenekian)		Russia	A member of the family Galfettitidae. Genus includes new species P. sakhnoi.	
Psiloceras pseudocostosum	Sp. nov	Valid	Kment	Early Jurassic (Hettangian)				
Retrotornoceras juxi	Sp. nov	Valid	Söte et al.	Devonian (Frasnian)	Sand Formation	Germany	A member of the family Tornoceratidae.	
Rhacophyllites mulleri	Sp. nov	Valid	Taylor, Guex & Lucas	Late Triassic (Rhaetian)	Gabbs Formation	United States (Nevada)		
Rhacophyllites volcanoensis	Sp. nov	Valid	Taylor, Guex & Lucas	Late Triassic (Rhaetian)	Gabbs Formation	United States (Nevada)		
Rollierites biplicatum	Sp. nov	Valid	Jain & Mazur	Middle Jurassic (Callovian)		Poland	A member of the family Pachyceratidae.	
Sandbergeroceras archiaci	Sp. nov	Valid	Korn & Bockwinkel	Devonian (Givetian)	Roteisenstein Formation	Germany	A member of Agoniatitida belonging to the family Triainoceratidae.	
Saudicostites	Gen. et sp. nov	Valid	Énay & Mangold	Middle Jurassic (Bathonian)	Dhruma Formation	Saudi Arabia	A member of Perisphinctoidea of uncertain phylogenetic placement. The type species is S. arabicus.	
Shevyrevites corrugatus	Sp. nov	Valid	Korn & Hairapetian in Korn et al.	Permian (Changhsingian)	Hambast Formation	Iran	A member of the family Xenodiscidae.	
Sigaloceras fundator	Sp. nov	Valid	Gulyaev in Gulyaev & Ippolitov	Middle Jurassic (Callovian)		Ukraine		
Sigaloceras kiselevi	Sp. nov	Valid	Gulyaev in Gulyaev & Ippolitov	Middle Jurassic (Callovian)		Ukraine		
Simocosticeras	Gen. et sp. nov	Valid	Nannarone & Bilotta	Late Jurassic (Tithonian)		Italy	A member of Perisphinctoidea belonging to the family Simoceratidae and the subfamily Simoceratinae. The type species is S. biornatum.	
Sinotropites	Gen. et sp. nov	In press	Mietto et al.	Late Triassic (Carnian)	Ma'antang Formation	China	Genus includes new species S. sichuanensis.	
Sonninia (Euhoploceras) crassicostae	Sp. nov	Valid	Énay & Mangold	Middle Jurassic (Bajocian)	Lower Dhruma Formation	Saudi Arabia	A member of the family Sonniniidae.	
Sonninia (Euhoploceras) turbator	Sp. nov	Valid	Énay & Mangold	Middle Jurassic (Bajocian)	Lower Dhruma Formation	Saudi Arabia	A member of the family Sonniniidae.	
Sonoraceras	Gen. et sp. nov	In press	Samaniego-Pesqueira, Moreno-Bedmar & Álvarez-Sánchez	Early Cretaceous (Aptian)		Mexico	Genus includes new species S. tepachensis.	
Stenopharciceras lotzi	Sp. nov	Valid	Korn & Bockwinkel	Devonian (Givetian)	Roteisenstein Formation	Germany	A member of Agoniatitida belonging to the family Pharciceratidae.	
Stoliczkaia (Lamnayella) duboisi	Sp. nov	Valid	Kennedy & Latil	Late Cretaceous (Cenomanian)		France	A member of the family Lyelliceratidae.	
Stoyanowites parallelus	Sp. nov	Valid	Korn & Hairapetian in Korn et al.	Permian (Changhsingian)	Hambast Formation	Iran	A member of the family Dzhulfitidae.	
Strenoceras djangurense	Sp. nov	Valid	Mitta	Middle Jurassic (Bajocian)		Russia		
Sulcicostites	Gen. et sp. nov	Valid	Nannarone & Bilotta	Late Jurassic (Tithonian)		Italy	A member of Perisphinctoidea belonging to the family Simoceratidae and the subfamily Simoceratinae. The type species is S. costatus.	
Timorites dendroides	Sp. nov	Valid	Korn & Ghaderi in Tabrizi et al.	Permian (Wuchiapingian)	Julfa Formation	Iran	A member of the family Cyclolobidae.	
Tornoceras aequilobum	Sp. nov	Valid	Söte et al.	Devonian (Frasnian)	Sand Formation	Germany	A member of the family Tornoceratidae.	
Tornoceras fundibulum	Sp. nov	Valid	Korn	Devonian (Famennian)			A member of the family Tornoceratidae.	
Tornoceras occasus	Sp. nov	Valid	Korn	Late Devonian		Morocco	A member of the family Tornoceratidae.	
Tornoceras ortus	Sp. nov	Valid	Korn	Late Devonian		Morocco	A member of the family Tornoceratidae.	
Tornoceras vretterense	Sp. nov	Valid	Korn	Devonian (Givetian)			A member of the family Tornoceratidae.	
Tropaeum evolutum	Sp. nov	In press	Lehmann & Bayliss	Early Cretaceous (Aptian)	Hythe Formation	United Kingdom		
Tropidoceras komarovi	Sp. nov	Valid	Zaitsev	Early Jurassic		Crimean Peninsula		
Vicininodiceras dalriatense	Sp. nov	Valid	Simms & Edmunds	Early Jurassic		United Kingdom		
Volanoceras cuneospinatum	Sp. nov	Valid	Nannarone & Bilotta	Late Jurassic (Tithonian)		Italy	A member of Perisphinctoidea belonging to the family Simoceratidae and the subfamily Volanoceratinae.	
Waehneroceras morawetzi	Sp. nov	Valid	Kment	Early Jurassic (Hettangian)				
Wordieoceras mullenae	Sp. nov	Valid	Jenks et al.	Early Triassic	Dinwoody Formation	United States (Nevada)	A member of Ceratitida belonging to the group Meekocerataceae and the family Ophiceratidae.	

=== Research ===
- A modern review of the palaeobiology of heteromorph ammonoids is published by Hoffmann et al. (2021), including details of their anatomy, buoyancy, locomotion, predators, diet, palaeoecology, and extinction.
- A study on the impact of the Permian–Triassic extinction event on the morphological diversity of ammonites is published by Dai, Korn & Song (2021).
- A study on the morphology and ontogeny of whorl profiles of the late Anisian ceratitid ammonites is published by Bischof et al. (2021).
- An exceptionally preserved specimen of Sigaloceras enodatum, providing information on the anatomy of ammonite muscles, is described from the Middle Jurassic (Callovian) Kellaways Sand Member of Colne Gravel (Gloucestershire, United Kingdom) by Cherns et al. (2021), who evaluate the implications of this specimen for the knowledge of the swimming mechanism of ammonites.
- Soft parts of a perisphinctid belonging to the genus Subplanites, separated from the conch either taphonomically or during a failed predation, are described from the Tithonian conservation deposits of Wintershof (southern Germany) by Klug et al. (2021).
- The first physical compression experiments on model ammonite septa are performed by Johnson et al. (2021), who attempt to determine whether the increasingly complex fractal margins of ammonite septa might have evolved to increase resistance to shell-crushing predators.
- A study aiming to determine the function of complex septa in the ammonite shell, providing evidence of a relationship between septal complexity and capacity for liquid retention within chambers of the shell, likely improving buoyancy regulation, is published by Peterman et al. (2021).
- Two specimens of Peltoceras athleta having both female and male features are described from Callovian limestone beds in Méron near Montreuil-Bellay (France) by Frau & Boursicot (2021), who interpret these specimens as cases of intersexuality in ammonites.
- Soft tissue remains preserved within the conch of a specimen of Proleymeriella schrammeni from the Albian of Germany are described by Hoffmann et al. (2021).
- A study on the arrangement in space and probable nature of hook-like structures found with specimens of Rhaeboceras halli is published by Smith et al. (2021), who interpret these structures as representing part of the brachial crown armature, and propose a hypothetical reconstruction of an ammonite brachial crown.
- A study on the systematics and phylogeny of the genus Aegocrioceras is published by Weinkauf, Hoffmann & Wiedenroth (2021).
- A study on the hydrostatic properties of Baculites compressus, and on their implications for the knowledge of the swimming capabilities and ecology of this ammonite and orthoconic cephalopods in general, is published by Peterman & Ritterbush (2021).
- Revision of the fossil material of Parapuzosia seppenradensis, including historic specimens from Europe and the United States and new material from England and Mexico, and a study on the ontogeny, distribution and evolution of this ammonite, is published by Ifrim et al. (2021).
- A study on the habitat depth preferences of Hoploscaphites constrictus from the European Boreal Chalk Sea, as indicated by stable isotope thermometry of aptychi and by data from predation marks on the scaphitid moulds, is published by Machalski et al. (2021).
- A study on the relationship between sutural complexity and body size in Cretaceous ammonites is published by Pérez-Claros (2021).

== Other cephalopods ==
=== New taxa ===
Name	Novelty	Status	Authors	Age	Type locality	Country	Notes	Images
Acrocoelites ippolitae	Sp. nov	Valid	Weis in Weis et al.	Middle Jurassic (Aalenian)		Germany	A belemnite.	
Anglonautilus hewaidyi	Sp. nov	In press	Moneer, Bazeen & Kassab	Late Cretaceous (Maastrichtian)		Egypt	A nautiloid cephalopod.	
Angulithes monqarensis	Sp. nov	In press	Moneer, Bazeen & Kassab	Late Cretaceous (Maastrichtian)		Egypt	A nautiloid cephalopod.	
Arionoceras tokushimaense	Sp. nov	Valid	Niko	Silurian (Ludlow)	Suberidani Group	Japan		
Bactroceras fluvii	Sp. nov	Valid	Kröger & Pohle	Ordovician (Dapingian)	Valhallfonna Formation	Norway		
Boreopeltis ifrimae	Sp. nov	In press	Fuchs & Stinnesbeck	Late Cretaceous (Turonian)		Mexico		
Buttsoceras buldrebreenense	Sp. nov	Valid	Kröger & Pohle	Ordovician (Floian)	Valhallfonna Formation	Norway	A member of the family Troedssonellidae.	
Cycloplectoceras hinlopense	Sp. nov	Valid	Kröger & Pohle	Ordovician (Floian)	Valhallfonna Formation	Norway	A member of the family Tarphyceratidae.	
Cyclostomiceras profilstrandense	Sp. nov	Valid	Kröger & Pohle	Ordovician (Floian)	Valhallfonna Formation	Norway	A member of the family Cyclostomiceratidae.	
Deltoceras beluga	Sp. nov	Valid	Kröger & Pohle	Ordovician (Floian)	Valhallfonna Formation	Norway	A member of the family Cyclostomiceratidae.	
Eosomichelinoceras borealis	Sp. nov	Valid	Kröger & Pohle	Ordovician (Floian)	Valhallfonna Formation	Norway	A member of the family Baltoceratidae.	
Eosomichelinoceras submedius	Sp. nov	Valid	Evans et al.	Ordovician (Darriwilian)	Pelmis Formation	Iran	A member of the family Baltoceratidae.	
Ethanoceras	Gen. et sp. nov	Valid	Kröger & Pohle	Ordovician (Floian)	Valhallfonna Formation	Norway	A relative of Rioceras. The type species is E. solitudines.	
Gzheloceras aisenvergi	Sp. nov	Valid	Dernov	Carboniferous (Serpukhovian)	Samara Formation	Ukraine	A member of the family Tainoceratidae.	
Hemichoanella occulta	Sp. nov	Valid	Kröger & Pohle	Ordovician (Floian)	Valhallfonna Formation	Norway		
Hinlopoceras	Gen. et 2 sp. nov	Valid	Kröger & Pohle	Ordovician (Floian)	Valhallfonna Formation	Norway	A relative of Rioceras. The type species is H. tempestatis; genus also includes H. venti.	
Jovellania praetermissa	Sp. nov	Valid	Brauckmann & Koch	Devonian (Givetian)	Massenkalk Formation	Germany		
Knightoceras extorris	Sp. nov	Valid	Dernov	Carboniferous (Pennsylvanian)		Ukraine	A member of the family Koninckioceratidae.	
Lawrenceoceras ebenus	Sp. nov	Valid	Kröger & Pohle	Ordovician (Floian)	Valhallfonna Formation	Norway		
Lawrenceoceras larus	Sp. nov	Valid	Kröger & Pohle	Ordovician (Floian)	Valhallfonna Formation	Norway		
Litoceras profilbekkenense	Sp. nov	Valid	Kröger & Pohle	Ordovician (Floian)	Valhallfonna Formation	Norway		
Mojsvaroceras gianii	Sp. nov	Valid	Pieroni & Prinoth	Middle Triassic (Anisian)		Italy	A nautiloid.	
Nyfrieslandoceras	Gen. et sp. nov	Valid	Kröger & Pohle	Ordovician (Floian)	Valhallfonna Formation	Norway	A member of Oncocerida belonging to the family Phthanoncoceratidae. The type species is N. bassleroceroides.	
Olenidslettoceras	Gen. et sp. nov	Valid	Kröger & Pohle	Ordovician (Floian)	Valhallfonna Formation	Norway	A member of Oncocerida belonging to the family Phthanoncoceratidae. The type species is O. farmi.	
Paracenoceras waageni	Sp. nov	Valid	Halder	Middle Jurassic (Callovian)	Chari Formation	India	A member of the family Paracenoceratidae.	
Planetoceras yefimenkoi	Sp. nov	Valid	Dernov	Carboniferous (Bashkirian)	Mospinka Formation	Ukraine	A member of the family Koninckioceratidae.	
Proterocameroceras valhallfonnense	Sp. nov	Valid	Kröger & Pohle	Ordovician (Floian)	Valhallfonna Formation	Norway		
Protocycloceras minor	Sp. nov	Valid	Kröger & Pohle	Ordovician (Floian)	Valhallfonna Formation	Norway	A member of the family Troedssonellidae.	
Rhynchorthoceras yizanense	Sp. nov	Valid	Fang in Fang et al.	Ordovician		China	A member of Lituitida.	
Sinoceras complexum	Sp. nov	Valid	Fang in Fang et al.	Ordovician		China	A member of Lituitida.	
Sorosoceras	Gen. et sp. nov	Valid	Evans et al.	Ordovician (Darriwilian)	Pelmis Formation	Iran	A member of the family Geisonoceratidae. The type species is S. castellum.	
Svalbardoceras	Gen. et 2 sp. nov	Valid	Kröger & Pohle	Ordovician (Floian)	Valhallfonna Formation	Norway	A relative of Rioceras. The type species is S. sterna; genus also includes S. skua.	
Tyrioceras longicameratum	Sp. nov	Valid	Fang in Fang et al.	Ordovician		China	A member of Lituitida.	
Xiaohenautilus mulleni	Sp. nov	Valid	Jenks et al.	Early Triassic	Dinwoody Formation	United States (Nevada)	A member of Nautilida belonging to the group Trigonoceratoidea and the family Grypoceratidae.	

=== Research ===
- New fossil material with shell features that characterize early cephalopods is described from the Cambrian (Terreneuvian) Bonavista Formation (Canada) by Hildenbrand et al. (2021), who interpret this finding as possibly representing the earliest cephalopods known to date, potentially pushing the origin of cephalopods back in time by about 30 million years, to the time before the first occurrence of euarthropods.
- Two specimens of Syrionautilus libanoticus preserving soft parts, including a specimen showing an imprint of the conch, are described from the Cenomanian of Hadjoula (Lebanon) by Klug et al. (2021).
- A study on the diversity patterns and spatial structure of belemnite assemblages in Western Tethys Ocean during the Early Jurassic is published by Neige, Weis & Fara (2021).
- A study on morphological changes of belemnites across the Pliensbachian-Toarcian boundary event, based on data from the Peniche GSSP section (Portugal), is published by Nätscher et al. (2021).
- A study on chemistry, organization and genesis of circular structures (superficially resembling chromatophores) preserved in coleoid cephalopod specimens from the Jurassic of Germany and the Cretaceous of Lebanon is published by Klug et al. (2021).
- A well-preserved soft-body imprint of a fossil squid is described from the lower Oligocene of the Krasnodar region (Russia) by Mironenko et al. (2021), who interpret this finding as the first unquestionable representative of Teuthida in the fossil record known to date, and report preservation of fish remains in the stomach contents of this squid, indicative of its piscivorous diet.
- A specimen of Jeletzkyteuthis coriacea holding a specimen of Parabelopeltis flexuosa in its arms, with the apex very close to its jaws, is described from the Toarcian Posidonia Shale (Germany) by Klug et al. (2021), who interpret this finding as a case of frozen predatory behaviour of two different octobrachian species.
- Redescription of the gladius of the holotype specimen of Necroteuthis hungarica is published by Košťák et al. (2021), who reinterpret this species as a member of the family Vampyroteuthidae linking Mesozoic loligosepiids with extant Vampyroteuthis.
- Klompmaker & Landman (2021) describe the oldest drill holes produced by octopodoids in lucinid bivalve specimens from the Campanian of South Dakota, indicating that the drilling habit evolved early in the evolutionary history of Octopodoidea.

== Gastropods ==
=== New taxa ===
Name	Novelty	Status	Authors	Age	Type locality	Country	Notes	Images
Acirsa ambrosii	Sp. nov	Valid	Brunetti & Cresti	Pliocene		Italy	A species of Acirsa.	
Acirsa (Notacirsa) texana	Sp. nov	Valid	Garvie	Paleocene (Danian)	Kincaid Formation	United States (Texas)	A species of Acirsa.	
Acteon pseudotypica	Sp. nov	Valid	Garvie	Paleocene (Danian)	Kincaid Formation	United States (Texas)	A species of Acteon.	
Acutitomaria	Gen. et sp. nov	Valid	Karapunar & Nützel	Late Triassic	San Cassiano Formation	Italy	A member of Pleurotomariida. Genus includes new species A. kustatscherae.	
Alatostrombus	Gen. et sp. et comb. nov	Valid	Raven	Miocene		Indonesia; Malaysia	A member of the family Strombidae. Genus includes new species A. acutalatus, as well as "Strombus" sedanensis Martin (1899).	
Alvania absuturalis	Sp. nov	Valid	Chirli & Forli	Pliocene		Italy	A species of Alvania.	
Alvania ameliae	Sp. nov	Valid	Chirli & Forli	Pleistocene		Italy	A species of Alvania.	
Alvania benestarensis	Sp. nov	Valid	Chirli & Forli	Miocene		Italy	A species of Alvania.	
Alvania cerreti	Sp. nov	Valid	Gardella et al.	Pliocene		Italy	A species of Alvania.	
Alvania pluricosticillata	Sp. nov	Disputed	Chirli & Forli	Plio-Pleistocene		Italy	Originally described as a species of Alvania. Argued to be a junior synonym of the extant taxon Crisilla gagliniae by Amati & Oliverio (2024).	
Amaea (Confusiscala) paleocaenica	Sp. nov	Valid	Garvie	Paleocene (Danian)	Kincaid Formation	United States (Texas)		
Ammonicera danieli	Sp. nov	Valid	Chernyshev & Goedert	Late Eocene/early Oligocene	Gries Ranch Formation	United States (Washington)	A species of Ammonicera.	
Ammonicera rolani	Sp. nov	Valid	Chernyshev & Goedert	Late Eocene/early Oligocene	Gries Ranch Formation	United States (Washington)	A species of Ammonicera.	
Ampezzogyra angulata	Sp. nov	Valid	Nützel & Hausmann in Hausmann et al.	Late Triassic (Carnian)	San Cassiano Formation	Italy	A member of the family Stuoraxidae.	
Amphidromus ubaldii	Sp. nov	Valid	Dharma	Late Pliocene		Indonesia	A species of Amphidromus.	
Amplitomaria	Gen. et comb. nov	Valid	Karapunar & Nützel				A member of Pleurotomariida. The type species is "Pleurotomaria" spuria Münster (1841).	
Anacithara akisi	Sp. nov	Valid	Kolokotronis	Pliocene		Cyprus	A species of Anacithara.	
Anceps siminescui	Nom. nov	Valid	Harzhauser	Middle-late Miocene		Moldova	A Trochidae member; a replacement name for Trochus semistriatus Siminescu & Barbu (1940).	
Angulatella	Gen. et sp. nov	Valid	Nützel & Hausmann in Hausmann et al.	Late Triassic (Carnian)	San Cassiano Formation	Italy	A member of the family Prostyliferidae. The type species is A. bizzarinii.	
Antithala	Gen. et comb. et 2 sp. nov	Valid	Harzhauser & Landau	Miocene	Dej Formation	Bosnia and Herzegovina; Hungary; Poland; Romania; Ukraine	A member of the family Costellariidae. The type species is "Mitra" sturi Hoernes & Auinger (1880); genus also includes "Mitra" neugeboreni Hoernes & Auinger (1880), as well as new species A. claviformis and A. filipescui.	
Apiocypraea cerretensis	Sp. nov	Valid	Fehse et al.	Pliocene (Zanclean)		Italy	A member of the family Eocypraeidae.	
Aplus abessensis	Sp. nov	Valid	Lozouet	Oligocene (Chattian)		France	A species of Aplus.	
Aplus grandiculus	Sp. nov	Valid	Lozouet	Oligocene (Chattian)		France	A species of Aplus.	
Aplus littoralis	Sp. nov	Valid	Lozouet	Oligocene (Chattian)		France	A species of Aplus.	
Aplus pseudoaquitanensis	Sp. nov	Valid	Lozouet	Oligocene (Chattian)		France	A species of Aplus.	
Aquilofusus? antiqua	Sp. nov	Valid	Garvie	Paleocene (Danian)	Kincaid Formation	United States (Texas)		
Ascheria canni	Sp. nov	Valid	Kaim et al.	Late Cretaceous (Cenomanian to Turonian)		Cyprus	A member of the family Hokkaidoconchidae.	
Asiaharpa	Gen. et sp. nov	Valid	Raven	Miocene		Malaysia	A member of the family Harpidae. Genus includes new species A. sarawakiana.	
Attenuata? danica	Sp. nov	Valid	Garvie	Paleocene (Danian)	Kincaid Formation	United States (Texas)	Possibly a species of Attenuata.	
Auingeria	Gen. et comb. nov	Valid	Harzhauser & Landau	Miocene	Baden Formation	Austria; Czech Republic; Germany; Hungary	A member of the family Columbellidae. The type species is "Columbella" bellardii Hörnes (1852); genus also includes "Columbella (Anachis)" austriaca Hoernes & Auinger (1880) and "Pyrene (Anachis) bellardii" grussbachensis Csepreghy-Meznerics (1969; raised to the rank of a separate species Auingeria grussbachensis).	
Axonella	Gen. et comb. et sp. nov	Valid	Pacaud, Lhomme & Renaud	Eocene (Ypresian)		France; Spain	A member of the family Hemisinidae. The type species is "Cerithium" palense Rouault (1850); genus also includes "Potamides" granosus Doncieux (1908), as well as new species A. falsiacum.	
Babylonia chattica	Sp. nov	Valid	Lozouet	Oligocene (Chattian)		France	A species of Babylonia.	
Babylonia edigittenbergeri	Sp. nov	Valid	Raven	Miocene	Miri Formation	Malaysia	A species of Babylonia.	
Babylonia sarawakiana	Sp. nov	Valid	Raven	Miocene	Miri Formation	Malaysia	A species of Babylonia.	
Bandellina compacta	Sp. nov	Valid	Nützel & Hausmann in Hausmann et al.	Late Triassic (Carnian)	San Cassiano Formation	Italy	A member of the family Cornirostridae.	
Barycypraea abbasi	Sp. nov	Valid	Dovesi & Parsons	Miocene (Serravallian)	Nyalindung Formation	Indonesia	A species of Barycypraea.	
Barycypraea alessandrodovesi	Sp. nov	Valid	Dovesi & Parsons	Miocene (Serravallian)	Nyalindung Formation	Indonesia	A species of Barycypraea.	
Bela pediensis	Sp. nov	Valid	Kolokotronis	Pliocene		Cyprus	A species of Bela.	
Bellacolumbella	Gen. et comb. nov	Valid	Harzhauser & Landau	Miocene	Baden Formation	Austria; Czech Republic; Hungary; Romania	A member of the family Columbellidae. The type species is "Columbella (Nitidella)" karreri Hoernes & Auinger (1880); genus also includes "Columbella (Nitidella)" embryonalis Boettger (1902) and "Columbella (Nitidella)" katharinae Hoernes & Auinger (1880).	
Bellardithala	Nom. et 4 sp. nov	Valid	Harzhauser & Landau	Miocene and Pliocene	Baden Formation; Dej Formation	Austria; Czech Republic; Italy; Poland; Romania; Ukraine; Hungary?	A member of the family Costellariidae; a replacement name for Micromitra Bellardi (1888). The type species is "Voluta" obsoleta Brocchi (1814); genus also includes new species B. kovaci, B. baluki, B. fedosovi and B. dacica.	
Bieleraxis	Gen. et 2 sp. nov	Valid	Garvie	Paleocene (Danian)	Kincaid Formation	United States (Texas)	Genus includes new species B. discoidea and B. altis.	
Bithynia disregularis	Sp. nov	In press	Li et al.	Oligocene	Yehucheng Formation	China	A species of Bithynia.	
Bithynia obliquus	Sp. nov	In press	Li et al.	Oligocene	Yehucheng Formation	China	A species of Bithynia.	
Bithynia parainclinimarga	Sp. nov	In press	Li et al.	Oligocene	Yehucheng Formation	China	A species of Bithynia.	
Bithynia paramonolithic	Sp. nov	In press	Li et al.	Oligocene	Yehucheng Formation	China	A species of Bithynia.	
Bittium prekoeneni	Sp. nov	Valid	Garvie	Paleocene (Danian)	Kincaid Formation	United States (Texas)	A species of Bittium.	
Bulimulus frenguellii	Sp. nov	Valid	Cabrera et al.	Late Cretaceous	Queguay Formation	Uruguay	A species of Bulimulus.	
Burminella	Gen. et sp. nov	In press	Balashov, Perkovsky & Vasilenko	Late Cretaceous (Cenomanian)	Burmese amber	Myanmar	A land snail possessing morphological traits intermediate between members of the family Pupinidae and other members of Cyclophoroidea. Genus includes new species B. artiukhini.	
Bursa transeuntis	Sp. nov	Valid	Forli & Smriglio	Miocene and Pliocene		Hungary; Italy; Poland	A species of Bursa.	
Caecum texanum	Sp. nov	Valid	Garvie	Paleocene (Danian)	Kincaid Formation	United States (Texas)	A species of Caecum.	
Califrapana	Gen. et comb. nov	Valid	Powell & Houart	Late Oligocene to early Miocene	Vaqueros Formation	Mexico; United States (California)	A member of the family Muricidae. The type species is "Purpura" vaquerosensis Arnold (1907).	
Calyptraphorus velusus	Sp. nov	Valid	Garvie	Paleocene (Danian)	Kincaid Formation	United States (Texas)		
Camponaxis bandeli	Sp. nov	Valid	Pieroni, Monari & Todd	Late Triassic (Carnian)	San Cassiano Formation	Italy	A Tofanellidae member	
Campylacrum texanum	Sp. nov	Valid	Garvie	Paleocene (Danian)	Kincaid Formation	United States (Texas)		
Canariella (Majorata) gerti	Sp. nov	Valid	Groh	Quaternary		Canary Islands	A species of Canariella.	
Cancellotomaria	Gen. et comb. nov	Valid	Karapunar & Nützel				A member of Pleurotomariida. The type species is "Pleurotomaria" subcancellata d'Orbigny (1850).	
Cancilla nanostriatula	Sp. nov	Valid	Harzhauser & Landau	Miocene	Baden Formation	Austria; Bulgaria; Hungary	A species of Cancilla.	
Cancilla wagreichi	Sp. nov	Valid	Harzhauser & Landau	Miocene	Dej Formation	Romania	A species of Cancilla.	
Capulus gelus	Sp. nov	Valid	Garvie	Paleocene (Danian)	Kincaid Formation	United States (Texas)	A species of Capulus.	
Cassis kalmani	Sp. nov	Valid	Vicián & Kovács	Eocene (Lutetian)	Csernye Formation	Hungary	A species of Cassis.	
Cassis rasae	Sp. nov	Valid	Petuch & Berschauer	Pleistocene		United States (Florida)	A species of Cassis.	
Cassis viliusi	Sp. nov	Valid	Petuch & Berschauer	Pleistocene		United States (Florida)	A species of Cassis.	
Cenorhytis	Gen. et sp. nov	Valid	Garvie	Paleocene (Danian)	Kincaid Formation	United States (Texas)	Genus includes new species C. groesbecki.	
Ceratopea? moridunensis	Sp. nov	Valid	Ebbestad & Cope	Ordovician (Floian)		United Kingdom	A member of the family Raphistomatidae.	
Cerithiella acuta	Sp. nov	Valid	Garvie	Paleocene (Danian)	Kincaid Formation	United States (Texas)	A species of Cerithiella.	
Cerithiscala parvibrazosa	Sp. nov	Valid	Garvie	Paleocene (Danian)	Kincaid Formation	United States (Texas)		
Cerithiscala tehuacana	Sp. nov	Valid	Garvie	Paleocene (Danian)	Kincaid Formation	United States (Texas)		
Chemnitzia silvai	Sp. nov	Valid	Landau & Micali	Pliocene		Spain	A species of Chemnitzia.	
Chevallieria texanopsis	Sp. nov	Valid	Garvie	Paleocene (Danian)	Kincaid Formation	United States (Texas)		
Chicomurex parvus	Sp. nov	Valid	Merle, Landau & Breitenberger	Miocene		Indonesia	A species of Chicomurex.	
Chicoreus javanus	Sp. nov	Valid	Merle, Landau & Breitenberger	Miocene		Indonesia	A species of Chicoreus.	
Chicoreus martini	Sp. nov	Valid	Merle, Landau & Breitenberger	Miocene		Indonesia	A species of Chicoreus.	
Chicoreus solidus	Sp. nov	Valid	Merle, Landau & Breitenberger	Miocene		Indonesia	A species of Chicoreus.	
Clava (Semivertagus) scriba	Sp. nov	Valid	Garvie	Paleocene (Danian)	Kincaid Formation	United States (Texas)		
Clavatula hirmetzli	Sp. nov	Valid	Kovács & Vicián	Middle Miocene	Lajta Limestone Formation	Hungary	A species of Clavatula.	
Clavatula santhai	Sp. nov	Valid	Kovács & Vicián	Middle Miocene	Lajta Limestone Formation	Hungary	A species of Clavatula.	
Clavatula szekelyhidiae	Sp. nov	Valid	Kovács & Vicián	Middle Miocene	Lajta Limestone Formation	Hungary	A species of Clavatula.	
Cochlespira (Tahusyrinx) laevis	Sp. nov	Valid	Garvie	Paleocene (Danian)	Kincaid Formation	United States (Texas)	A species of Cochlespira.	
Conilithes herodus	Sp. nov	Valid	Psarras, Koskeridou & Merle	Miocene (Tortonian)		Greece	A species of Conilithes.	
Conradconfusus nodulinus	Sp. nov	Valid	Garvie	Eocene	Cook Mountain Formation	United States (Texas)		
Conradconfusus texanus	Sp. nov	Valid	Garvie	Paleocene (Danian)	Kincaid Formation	United States (Texas)		
Conus (Kalloconus) asterousiaensis	Sp. nov	Valid	Psarras, Koskeridou & Merle	Miocene (Tortonian)		Greece; Italy	A species of Conus.	
Conus (Kalloconus) helladicus	Sp. nov	Valid	Psarras, Koskeridou & Merle	Miocene (Tortonian)		Greece	A species of Conus.	
Cordieria biouesensis	Sp. nov	Valid	Pacaud	Paleocene (Thanetian)		France	A species of Cordieria.	
Coronia argilla	Sp. nov	Valid	Garvie	Paleocene (Danian)	Kincaid Formation	United States (Texas)		
Costoanachis venzoi	Nom. nov	Valid	Harzhauser & Landau	Miocene		Italy	A species of Costoanachis; a replacement name for Anachis (Costoanachis) subcorrugata Venzo & Pelosio (1963).	
Crassaseila	Gen. et 2 sp. nov	Valid	Garvie	Paleocene (Danian)	Kincaid Formation	United States (Texas)	Genus includes new species C. ripleyana and C. paleocenica.	
Crassispira plioibericostricta	Sp. nov	Valid	Brunetti & Forli	Pliocene (Zanclean)		Spain	A species of Crassispira.	
Crassispira pseudoglabra	Sp. nov	Valid	Brunetti & Forli	Pliocene (Piacenzian)		Italy	A species of Crassispira.	
Crenaturricula minuta	Sp. nov	Valid	Garvie	Paleocene (Danian)	Kincaid Formation	United States (Texas)		
Creonella hebetertia	Sp. nov	Valid	Garvie	Paleocene (Danian)	Kincaid Formation	United States (Texas)		
Cretatortulosa cretakachinensis	Sp. nov	In press	Yu, Salvador & Jarzembowski	Late Cretaceous (Cenomanian)	Burmese amber	Myanmar		
Cretatortulosa gignens	Sp. nov	In press	Jochum, Yu & Neubauer	Late Cretaceous (Cenomanian)	Burmese amber	Myanmar	A member of the family Pupinidae.	
Cryptochorda paleocaenica	Sp. nov	Valid	Garvie	Paleocene (Danian)	Kincaid Formation	United States (Texas)		
Cyathopoma pingyiensis	Sp. nov	In press	Yu et al.	Cretaceous–Paleogene transition	Pingyi Basin	China	A species of Cyathopoma.	
Cylichna (Cylichnopsis) elliptica	Sp. nov	Valid	Garvie	Paleocene (Danian)	Kincaid Formation	United States (Texas)	A species of Cylichna.	
Cymatiella dulaii	Sp. nov	Valid	Vicián & Kovács	Eocene (Lutetian)	Csernye Formation	Hungary	A species of Cymatiella.	
Cymatiella tzankovi	Nom. nov	Valid	Vicián & Kovács	Paleocene		Bulgaria	A species of Cymatiella; a replacement name for Eutritonium (Sassia) rutoti Tzankov (1940).	
Cymatium danianum	Sp. nov	Valid	Garvie	Paleocene (Danian)	Kincaid Formation	United States (Texas)	A species of Cymatium.	
Cyphoma guraboensis	Sp. nov	Valid	Groves & Landau	Early Pliocene	Gurabo Formation	Dominican Republic	A species of Cyphoma.	
Cypraeorbis alisonkayae	Sp. nov	Valid	Groves & Landau	Miocene		Dominican Republic	A species of Cypraeorbis.	
Cyprioconcha	Gen. et sp. nov	Valid	Kaim et al.	Late Cretaceous (Cenomanian to Turonian)		Cyprus	A member of the family Hokkaidoconchidae. The type species is C. robertsoni.	
Defensina	Gen. et comb. nov	Valid	Harzhauser & Landau	Miocene		Bosnia and Herzegovina; Bulgaria; Romania	A member of the family Columbellidae. The type species is "Columbella (Mitrella)" bucciniformis Hoernes & Auinger (1880).	
Dermomurex wanneri	Nom. nov	Valid	Merle, Landau & Breitenberger	Miocene		Indonesia	A species of Dermomurex; a replacement name for Murex acuticostatus Wanner & Hahn (1935).	
Desbruyeresia kambiaensis	Sp. nov	Valid	Kaim et al.	Late Cretaceous (Cenomanian to Turonian)		Cyprus	A species of Desbruyeresia.	
Desbruyeresia kinousaensis	Sp. nov	Valid	Kaim et al.	Late Cretaceous (Cenomanian to Turonian)		Cyprus	A species of Desbruyeresia.	
Desbruyeresia memiensis	Sp. nov	Valid	Kaim et al.	Late Cretaceous (Cenomanian to Turonian)		Cyprus	A species of Desbruyeresia.	
Discotectonica paracutissima	Sp. nov	Valid	Garvie	Paleocene (Danian)	Kincaid Formation	United States (Texas)	A species of Discotectonica.	
Doliella parnitens	Sp. nov	Valid	Garvie	Paleocene (Danian)	Kincaid Formation	United States (Texas)	A species of Doliella.	
Domiporta amoena	Sp. nov	Valid	Harzhauser & Landau	Miocene	Dej Formation	Austria; Bulgaria; Romania	A species of Domiporta.	
Domiporta pulchra	Sp. nov	Valid	Harzhauser & Landau	Miocene	Dej Formation	Romania	A species of Domiporta.	
Domiporta turpis	Sp. nov	Valid	Harzhauser & Landau	Miocene	Baden Formation	Austria	A species of Domiporta.	
Ederazyga	Gen. et sp. et comb. nov	Valid	Pieroni, Monari & Todd	Late Triassic (Carnian to Rhaetian)	Nayband Formation; San Cassiano Formation; Zu Limestone	Iran; Italy; Slovenia	A possible Zygopleuridae member. The type species is E. fanchini; genus also includes "Cerithium"? lateplicatum Klipstein (1843).	
Ellobium mizutanii	Sp. nov	Valid	Kawase & Ichihara	Early Miocene	Akeyo Formation	Japan	A species of Ellobium.	
Entemnotrochus kathiawarensis	Sp. nov	Valid	Bose, Das & Mondal	Miocene (Burdigalian)		India	A species of Entemnotrochus.	
Eoacteon paracutissima	Sp. nov	Valid	Garvie	Paleocene (Danian)	Kincaid Formation	United States (Texas)		
Eoancilla lapicidina	Sp. nov	Valid	Garvie	Paleocene (Danian)	Kincaid Formation	United States (Texas)		
Eocithara (?) laurencei	Sp. nov	Valid	Garvie	Paleocene (Danian)	Kincaid Formation	United States (Texas)		
Eopleurotoma atacica	Nom. nov	Valid	Pacaud	Eocene (Ypresian)		France	A species of Eopleurotoma; a replacement name for Pleurotoma (Eopleurotoma) romani Doncieux (1908).	
Eotrivia pacaudi	Sp. nov	Valid	Fehse	Eocene		Italy		
Eoturris fallsensis	Sp. nov	Valid	Garvie	Paleocene (Danian)	Kincaid Formation	United States (Texas)		
Eoworthenia frydai	Nom. nov	Valid	Karapunar & Nützel				A member of Pleurotomariida; a replacement name for Worthenia rarissima Barrande.	
Episcomitra antibellardii	Sp. nov	Valid	Harzhauser & Landau	Miocene	Dej Formation	Romania	A species of Episcomitra.	
Episcomitra leopoldiana	Sp. nov	Valid	Harzhauser & Landau	Miocene	Baden Formation	Austria; Czech Republic; Poland	A species of Episcomitra.	
Episcomitra missile	Sp. nov	Valid	Harzhauser & Landau	Miocene	Grund Formation	Austria; Hungary	A species of Episcomitra.	
Episcomitra neubaueri	Sp. nov	Valid	Harzhauser & Landau	Miocene	Dej Formation	Romania	A species of Episcomitra.	
Episcomitra pontonxensis	Sp. nov	Valid	Lozouet	Oligocene (Chattian)		France	A species of Episcomitra.	
Episcomitra pseudoincognita	Sp. nov	Valid	Harzhauser & Landau	Miocene	Dej Formation	Romania; Ukraine	A species of Episcomitra.	
Episcomitra vermeuleni	Sp. nov	Valid	Pacaud	Eocene (Priabonian)		Ukraine	A species of Episcomitra.	
Eulimella ariejansseni	Sp. nov	Valid	Landau & Micali	Pliocene		Spain	A species of Eulimella.	
Euthema myanmarica	Sp. nov	Valid	Balashov	Cretaceous	Hkamti amber	Myanmar	A species of Euthema.	
Euthria mellianensis	Sp. nov	Valid	Lozouet	Miocene		France	A species of Euthria.	
Euthria tarusatensis	Sp. nov	Valid	Lozouet	Oligocene (Chattian)		France	A species of Euthria.	
Euthriofusus argillensis	Sp. nov	Valid	Lozouet	Oligocene (Chattian)		France		
Falsifusus problematicus	Sp. nov	Valid	Garvie	Paleocene (Danian)	Kincaid Formation	United States (Texas)		
Fedosovia	Gen. et comb. nov	Valid	Harzhauser & Landau	Miocene		Czech Republic; Italy; Romania	A member of the family Costellariidae. The type species is "Mitra (Callithea)" fuchsi Hoernes & Auinger (1880).	
Fraudiziba	Gen. et nom. et sp. nov	Valid	Harzhauser & Landau	Miocene and Pliocene	Karaman Basin	Austria; Bosnia and Herzegovina; Czech Republic; Hungary; Italy; Poland; Romania; Slovakia; Turkey; Ukraine	A member of the family Mitridae. The type species is F. paratethyca (a replacement name for Mitra austriaca Csepreghy-Meznerics, 1950); genus also includes new species F. ottomanica.	
Fulgurofusus spinosus	Sp. nov	Valid	Garvie	Paleocene (Danian)	Kincaid Formation	United States (Texas)	A species of Fulgurofusus.	
Fusulculus texanus	Sp. nov	Valid	Garvie	Paleocene (Danian)	Kincaid Formation	United States (Texas)	A species of Fusulculus.	
Galba prima	Sp. nov	Valid	Yu, Neubauer & Jochum	Cretaceous	Burmese amber	Myanmar	A species of Galba.	
Gemmula bearrizensis	Nom. nov	Valid	Pacaud	Eocene (Priabonian)		France	A species of Gemmula; a replacement name for Drillia pellati Boussac (1911).	
Gemmula osca	Sp. nov	Valid	Pacaud	Eocene (Bartonian)		Spain	A species of Gemmula.	
Gentilifulgur	Gen. et sp. nov	Valid	Garvie	Paleocene (Danian)	Kincaid Formation	United States (Texas)	Genus includes new species G. praemortoni.	
Gibbula lovellreevei	Nom. nov	Valid	Harzhauser	Pliocene		United Kingdom	A Trochidae member; a replacement name for Trochus (Gibbula) reevei Harmer (1923).	
Gibbula pizzolatoi	Sp. nov	Valid	Spadini	Pliocene		Italy	A species of Gibbula.	
Gibbula steiningeri	Nom. nov	Valid	Harzhauser	Early Miocene		Austria	A Trochidae member; a replacement name for Trochus amedei bicincta Schaffer (1912).	
Gibbula tavanii	Nom. nov	Valid	Harzhauser	Miocene		Libya	A Trochidae member; a replacement name for Gibbula minima Tavani (1939).	
Gibbuliculus	Gen. et comb. et nom. nov	Valid	Harzhauser	Oligocene to Pleistocene		Europe	A Trochidae member; The type species is "Gibbula" brebioni Landau, Van Dingenen & Ceulemans (2017). Genus includes G. saccoi (a replacement name for Gibbula protumida Sacco, 1896).	
"Gibbulinella" sandbergeri	Nom. nov	Valid	Harzhauser & Neubauer	Eocene		Italy	A member of the family Streptaxidae; a replacement name for Pupa simplex Sandberger (1870).	
Haedropleura dellabellai	Sp. nov	Valid	Brunetti & Cresti	Pliocene		Italy	A species of Haedropleura.	
Hammatospira cancellata	Sp. nov	Valid	Mazaev	Early Carboniferous		Kazakhstan		
Hespererato canae	Sp. nov	Valid	Groves & Landau	Late Miocene and early Pliocene	Cercado Formation	Dominican Republic	A species of Hespererato.	
Hespererato praeclusa	Sp. nov	Valid	Groves & Landau	Early–middle Miocene	Baitoa Formation	Dominican Republic	A species of Hespererato.	
Hexaplex nascium	Sp. nov	Valid	Garvie	Paleocene (Danian)	Kincaid Formation	United States (Texas)	A species of Hexaplex.	
Hirsuticyclus canaliculatus	Sp. nov	In press	Yu	Cretaceous	Burmese amber	Myanmar	A member of the family Cyclophoridae.	
Hochheimia	Nom. nov	Valid	Harzhauser & Neubauer	Oligocene		Germany	A member of the family Hygromiidae; a replacement name for Palaeotrichia Nordsieck (2014).	
Hokkaidoconcha morisseaui	Sp. nov	Valid	Kaim et al.	Late Cretaceous (Cenomanian to Turonian)		Cyprus	A member of the family Hokkaidoconchidae.	
Holospira? fallsensis	Sp. nov	Valid	Garvie	Paleocene (Danian)	Kincaid Formation	United States (Texas)	Possibly a species of Holospira.	
?Hydrocena praecursor	Sp. nov	In press	Yu & Neubauer	Late Cretaceous (Cenomanian)	Burmese amber	Myanmar	A member of the family Hydrocenidae.	
Jponsia lacetania	Sp. nov	Valid	Pacaud & Goret	Eocene (Ypresian)		Spain	A member of the family Pachychilidae.	
Kapalmerella gelus	Sp. nov	Valid	Garvie	Paleocene (Danian)	Kincaid Formation	United States (Texas)		
Keepingia elongata	Sp. nov	Valid	Lozouet	Oligocene (Chattian)		France		
Laevispira	Gen. et comb. et sp. nov	Valid	Raven	Miocene and Pliocene		Brunei; India; Indonesia	A member of the family Strombidae. Genus includes "Dolomena" bruneiensis Harzhauser, Raven & Landau (2018), "Strombus" glaber Martin (1879), "Strombus" karikalensis Cossmann (1903), "Strombus" triangulatus Martin (1879) and "Strombus" varinginensis Martin (1899), as well as new species L. seriaensis.	
Laevitrivia	Gen. et comb. et 5 sp. nov	Valid	Fehse & Vicián	Miocene and Pliocene		France; Italy	A member of the family Triviidae. The type species is "Cypraea" pisolina Lamarck, (1810); genus also includes new species L. annae, L. bertaccinii, L. pliopisolina, L. pseudocalva and L. ventricostata.	
Latirus? asperpellis	Sp. nov	Valid	Garvie	Paleocene (Danian)	Kincaid Formation	United States (Texas)	Possibly a species of Latirus.	
Laubella subsulcata	Sp. nov	Valid	Karapunar & Nützel	Late Triassic	San Cassiano Formation	Italy	A member of Pleurotomariida.	
Lineacingulum	Gen. et comb. nov	Valid	Karapunar & Nützel				A member of Pleurotomariida. The type species is "Pleurotomaria" texturata Münster (1841).	
Lineaetomaria	Gen. et comb. nov	Valid	Karapunar & Nützel				A member of Pleurotomariida. The type species is "Pleurotomaria" decorata Münster (1841).	
Liostomia wilvanderstoelae	Sp. nov	Valid	Landau & Micali	Pliocene		Spain	A species of Liostomia.	
Littorina elongata	Sp. nov	Valid	Garvie	Paleocene (Danian)	Kincaid Formation	United States (Texas)	A species of Littorina.	
Littorina (Prosthenodon) incertus	Sp. nov	Valid	Garvie	Paleocene (Danian)	Kincaid Formation	United States (Texas)	A species of Littorina.	
Lupira danianum	Sp. nov	Valid	Garvie	Paleocene (Danian)	Kincaid Formation	United States (Texas)		
Lutema gracilis	Sp. nov	Valid	Garvie	Paleocene (Danian)	Kincaid Formation	United States (Texas)		
Lyria elongata	Sp. nov	Valid	Garvie	Paleocene (Danian)	Kincaid Formation	United States (Texas)	A species of Lyria.	
Lyria tehuacana	Sp. nov	Valid	Garvie	Paleocene (Danian)	Kincaid Formation	United States (Texas)	A species of Lyria.	
Malea hyaducki	Sp. nov	Valid	Petuch & Berschauer	Pliocene		United States (Florida)	A species of Malea.	
Martaia	Gen. et comb. nov	Valid	Harzhauser & Landau	Miocene		Austria; Bulgaria; Czech Republic; Hungary; Romania; Ukraine	A member of the family Columbellidae. The type species is "Columbella (Anachis)" dujardini Hoernes & Auinger (1880); genus also includes "Columbella (Anachis)" zitteli Hoernes & Auinger (1880).	
Mathilda (Echinimathilda) duogenta	Sp. nov	Valid	Garvie	Paleocene (Danian)	Kincaid Formation	United States (Texas)	A species of Mathilda.	
Melongena pontonxensis	Sp. nov	Valid	Lozouet	Oligocene (Chattian)		France	A species of Melongena.	
Metula bulbiformis	Sp. nov	Valid	Lozouet	Oligocene (Chattian)		France	A species of Metula.	
Metula nana	Sp. nov	Valid	Lozouet	Oligocene (Chattian)		France	A species of Metula.	
Metula pseudomajor	Sp. nov	Valid	Lozouet	Oligocene (Chattian)		France	A species of Metula.	
Metula rivulisensis	Sp. nov	Valid	Lozouet	Oligocene (Chattian)		France	A species of Metula.	
Mimospira llangynogensis	Sp. nov	Valid	Ebbestad & Cope	Ordovician (Floian)		United Kingdom	A member of the family Clisospiridae.	
Mitrella dacica	Sp. nov	Valid	Harzhauser & Landau	Miocene	Dej Formation	Hungary; Romania; Slovakia	A species of Mitrella.	
Mitrella demaintenonae	Sp. nov	Valid	Harzhauser & Landau	Miocene	Baden Formation; Dej Formation	Austria; Romania	A species of Mitrella.	
Mitrella elongatissima	Sp. nov	Valid	Harzhauser & Landau	Miocene	Baden Formation	Austria; Bosnia and Herzegovina	A species of Mitrella.	
Mitrella fortis	Sp. nov	Valid	Garvie	Paleocene (Danian)	Kincaid Formation	United States (Texas)	A species of Mitrella.	
Mitrella tarbelliana	Sp. nov	Valid	Lozouet	Oligocene (Chattian)		France	A species of Mitrella.	
Mitrella viennensis	Sp. nov	Valid	Harzhauser & Landau	Miocene	Baden Formation	Austria; Bulgaria; Czech Republic; Kazakhstan; Poland; Romania	A species of Mitrella.	
Moniquia astibiai	Sp. nov	Valid	Pacaud & Goret	Eocene (Priabonian)		Spain	A member of the family Pachychilidae.	
Monoplex s.l. szakonyii	Sp. nov	Valid	Vicián & Kovács	Eocene (Lutetian)	Csernye Formation	Hungary	A member of the family Cymatiidae.	
Mulderia mulderi	Sp. nov	Valid	Landau & Micali	Pliocene		Spain	A member of the family Pyramidellidae.	
Multitrochia	Gen. et sp. nov	Valid	Garvie	Paleocene (Danian)	Kincaid Formation	United States (Texas)	Genus includes new species M. tehuacana.	
Nannamoria alquezae	Sp. nov	Valid	Hawke	Miocene		Australia	A species of Nannamoria.	
Nannamoria cadella	Sp. nov	Valid	Hawke	Miocene	Cadel Formation	Australia	A species of Nannamoria.	
Nannamoria costatum	Sp. nov	Valid	Hawke	Pliocene	Cameron Inlet Formation	Australia	A species of Nannamoria.	
Nannamoria flindersi	Sp. nov	Valid	Hawke	Pliocene	Cameron Inlet Formation	Australia	A species of Nannamoria.	
Nannamoria gnotuki	Sp. nov	Valid	Hawke			Australia	A species of Nannamoria.	
Nannamoria hiscocki	Sp. nov	Valid	Hawke	Pliocene	Cameron Inlet Formation	Australia	A species of Nannamoria.	
Nannamoria malonei	Sp. nov	Valid	Hawke			Australia	A species of Nannamoria.	
Nannamoria persimilis	Sp. nov	Valid	Hawke	Miocene		Australia	A species of Nannamoria.	
Naria praehelvola	Sp. nov	Valid	Fehse & Vicián	Miocene		Indonesia	A species of Naria.	
Natica (Carinacca) kincaidensis	Sp. nov	Valid	Garvie	Paleocene (Danian)	Kincaid Formation	United States (Texas)	A species of Natica.	
Nebularia soliphila	Sp. nov	Valid	Harzhauser & Landau	Miocene	Baden Formation	Austria	A species of Nebularia.	
Nemaspira	Gen. et comb. et 2 sp. nov	Valid	Mazaev	Early Carboniferous to Late Triassic		Belgium; Russia; Thailand; United Kingdom; United States; China?	A member of the family Gosseletinidae. Genus includes several species formerly assigned to the genera Gosseletina and Globodoma, as well as new species N. shamaevi and N. skuini.	
Nitidiclavus senesi	Sp. nov	Valid	Biskupič	Miocene		Slovakia	A member of the family Drilliidae.	
Niveria callosa	Sp. nov	Valid	Fehse	Late Oligocene		France	A species of Niveria.	
Niveria novosperara	Sp. nov	Valid	Fehse	Late Oligocene		France	A species of Niveria.	
Nodocingulum	Gen. et comb. et 2 sp. nov	Valid	Karapunar & Nützel	Late Triassic	San Cassiano Formation	Italy	A member of Pleurotomariida. The type species is "Pleurotomaria" coronata Münster (1841); genus also includes new species N. ernstkittli and possibly also N? turris.	
Nodolargena	Gen. et sp. nov	Valid	Garvie	Paleocene (Danian)	Kincaid Formation	United States (Texas)	A member of the new family Nodolargenidae. Genus includes new species N. frosti.	
Nodovoluta	Gen. et sp. nov	Valid	Garvie	Paleocene (Danian)	Kincaid Formation	United States (Texas)	Genus includes new species N. coronata.	
Odostomia malagensis	Sp. nov	Valid	Landau & Micali	Pliocene		Spain	A species of Odostomia.	
Oligonalia	Gen. et comb. nov	Valid	Lozouet	Oligocene		France	A new genus for "Siphonalia" riparia Lozouet (1999).	
Olinderia	Gen. et comb. et 3 sp. nov	Valid	Lozouet	Oligocene (Chattian)		France	A member of the family Charitodoronidae. The type species is "Charitodoron" tauzini Lozouet (1991); genus also includes new species O. lestrillensis, O. poustagnacensis and O. verdunensis.	
Olivella tehuacanensis	Sp. nov	Valid	Garvie	Paleocene (Danian)	Kincaid Formation	United States (Texas)	A species of Olivella.	
Ondina pinguis	Sp. nov	Valid	Landau & Micali	Pliocene		Spain	A species of Ondina.	
Onustus undosus	Sp. nov	Valid	Raven	Miocene		Brunei	A species of Onustus.	
Opalia tehuacana	Sp. nov	Valid	Garvie	Paleocene (Danian)	Kincaid Formation	United States (Texas)	A species of Opalia.	
Orbitestella kieli	Sp. nov	Valid	Chernyshev & Goedert	Late Eocene/early Oligocene	Gries Ranch Formation	United States (Washington)	A member of the family Orbitestellidae.	
Orthosurcula ethani	Sp. nov	Valid	Garvie	Eocene	Cook Mountain Formation	United States (Texas)		
Oxyacrum gracilis	Sp. nov	Valid	Garvie	Paleocene (Danian)	Kincaid Formation	United States (Texas)		
Pagonia	Gen. et sp. nov	Valid	Garvie	Paleocene (Danian)	Kincaid Formation	United States (Texas)	Genus includes new species P. spiralis.	
Palaeorhaphis? laevis	Sp. nov	Valid	Garvie	Paleocene (Danian)	Kincaid Formation	United States (Texas)		
Paleofusus	Gen. et 3 sp. nov	Valid	Garvie	Paleocene (Danian)	Kincaid Formation	United States (Texas)	Genus includes new species P. bellus, P. parvicrassus and P. elegantissima.	
Papuliscala? acus	Sp. nov	Valid	Garvie	Paleocene (Danian)	Kincaid Formation	United States (Texas)	Possibly a species of Papuliscala.	
Papuliscala keani	Sp. nov	Valid	Garvie	Eocene	Cook Mountain Formation	United States (Texas)		
Parasassia vargai	Sp. nov	Valid	Vicián & Kovács	Eocene (Lutetian)	Csernye Formation	Hungary	A member of the family Cymatiidae.	
Parthenina pacaudi	Nom. nov	Valid	Landau & Micali	Miocene		France	A species of Parthenina; a replacement name for Pyrgulina (Parthenina) dollfusi Cossmann (1921).	
Parvisipho? spiralis	Sp. nov	Valid	Garvie	Paleocene (Danian)	Kincaid Formation	United States (Texas)		
Paskentana dixoni	Sp. nov	Valid	Kaim et al.	Late Cretaceous (Cenomanian to Turonian)		Cyprus	A member of Abyssochrysoidea belonging to the family Paskentanidae.	
Paskentana xenophontosi	Sp. nov	Valid	Kaim et al.	Late Cretaceous (Cenomanian to Turonian)		Cyprus	A member of Abyssochrysoidea belonging to the family Paskentanidae.	
Perotrochus bermotiensis	Sp. nov	Valid	Bose, Das & Mondal	Oligocene		India	A species of Perotrochus.	
Perrona harzhauseri	Sp. nov	Valid	Kovács & Vicián	Middle Miocene	Lajta Limestone Formation	Hungary	A species of Perrona.	
Perrona nemethi	Sp. nov	Valid	Kovács & Vicián	Middle Miocene	Lajta Limestone Formation	Hungary	A species of Perrona.	
Personopsis merlei	Sp. nov	Valid	Vicián & Kovács	Eocene (Lutetian)	Csernye Formation	Hungary	A species of Personopsis.	
Pfefferiola	Nom. nov	Valid	Harzhauser & Neubauer	Eocene		Italy	A member of the family Streptaxidae; a replacement name for Oppenheimiella Pfeffer (1930).	
Phos estotiensis	Sp. nov	Valid	Lozouet	Oligocene (Chattian)		France	A species of Phos.	
Pleurotomella irminonvilla	Nom. nov	Valid	Pacaud	Eocene (Bartonian)		France	A species of Pleurotomella; a replacement name for Pleurotomella cossmanni Morellet & Morellet (1946).	
Pliciscala obliqua	Sp. nov	Valid	Garvie	Eocene	Cook Mountain Formation	United States (Texas)		
Poirieria (Paziella) delera	Sp. nov	Valid	Garvie	Paleocene (Danian)	Kincaid Formation	United States (Texas)		
Polinices tehuacana	Sp. nov	Valid	Garvie	Paleocene (Danian)	Kincaid Formation	United States (Texas)	A species of Polinices.	
Popenoeum tabulatum	Sp. nov	Valid	Garvie	Paleocene (Danian)	Kincaid Formation	United States (Texas)		
Pressulasphaera	Gen. et comb. nov	Valid	Karapunar & Nützel				A member of Pleurotomariida. The type species is "Pleurotomaria" pamphilus d'Orbigny (1850).	
Priscoficus johnfoxi	Sp. nov	Valid	Garvie	Paleocene (Danian)	Kincaid Formation	United States (Texas)		
Priscoficus nodulina	Sp. nov	Valid	Garvie	Paleocene (Danian)	Kincaid Formation	United States (Texas)		
Proceraedis	Gen. et 2 sp. nov	Valid	Garvie	Paleocene (Danian)	Kincaid Formation	United States (Texas)	Genus includes new species P. imbricataria and P. tegumenis.	
Prososthenia esuegirottii	Sp. nov	Valid	Dominici & Forli	Pliocene (Zanclean)		Italy	A member of the family Hydrobiidae.	
Protoplex? zsoldosi	Sp. nov	Valid	Vicián & Kovács	Eocene (Lutetian)	Csernye Formation	Hungary	A member of the family Cymatiidae.	
Proviviparus	Gen. et sp. nov	Valid	Frese & Ponder	Late Jurassic	Talbragar Fish Bed	Australia	A member of the family Viviparidae. Genus includes new species P. talbragarensis	
Pseudoananias	Gen. et comb. nov	Valid	Karapunar & Nützel				A member of Pleurotomariida. The type species is "Pleurotomaria" subgranulata Münster (1841).	
Pseudokatosira uhlhingleyorum	Sp. nov	Valid	Gründel, Davies & Simonsen	Early Jurassic (Pliensbachian)				
Pseudolatirus acuelatus	Sp. nov	Valid	Garvie	Paleocene (Danian)	Kincaid Formation	United States (Texas)	A species of Pseudolatirus.	
Pseudolatirus boettgeri	Nom. nov	Valid	Kovács	Miocene		Romania	A member of the family Fasciolariidae; a replacement name for Fusus sublamellosus Boettger (1906). Originally described as a species of Pseudolatirus; Harzhauser, Landau & Vermeij (2024) tentatively placed it in the genus Takashius.	
Pseudosassia	Gen. et comb. et 2 sp. nov	Valid	Vicián & Kovács	Paleocene–Miocene		Austria; Belgium; Bulgaria; Czech Republic; Denmark; France; Germany; Hungary; Italy; Netherlands; Poland; Romania; Serbia; Slovakia; Turkey; Ukraine; United Kingdom	A member of the family Cymatiidae. The type species is "Triton" flandricum Koninck (1838); genus also includes new species P. gurdoni and P. traceyi.	
Pseudoterebellum	Gen. et comb. nov	Valid	Maxwell, Rymer & Congdon	Eocene	Ghazij Shales	Indonesia; Pakistan; Saudi Arabia	A member of the family Seraphsidae. The type species is "Terebellum" diversiornatum Eames (1952); genus also includes "Terebellum" saudiensis Abbass (1972) and "Terebellum" olympiae Rolando (2001).	
Ptychatractus cataractus	Sp. nov	Valid	Garvie	Paleocene (Danian)	Kincaid Formation	United States (Texas)	A species of Ptychatractus.	
Pulchraspira	Gen. et sp. nov	In press	Yu, Salvador & Jarzembowski	Late Cretaceous (Cenomanian)	Burmese amber	Myanmar	Genus includes new species P. teneristoma.	
Puposyrnola? confusa	Sp. nov	Valid	Garvie	Paleocene (Danian)	Kincaid Formation	United States (Texas)	Possibly a species of Puposyrnola.	
Puposyrnola multibaca	Sp. nov	Valid	Garvie	Paleocene (Danian)	Kincaid Formation	United States (Texas)	A species of Puposyrnola.	
Puposyrnola obliqua	Sp. nov	Valid	Garvie	Paleocene (Danian)	Kincaid Formation	United States (Texas)	A species of Puposyrnola.	
Puposyrnola shirleyae	Sp. nov	Valid	Garvie	Paleocene (Danian)	Kincaid Formation	United States (Texas)	A species of Puposyrnola.	
Pusia aturensis	Sp. nov	Valid	Lozouet	Oligocene (Chattian)		France	A species of Pusia.	
Pusia confunda	Sp. nov	Valid	Harzhauser & Landau	Miocene	Dej Formation	Romania	A species of Pusia.	
Pusia? falsitranssylvanica	Nom. nov	Valid	Harzhauser & Landau	Miocene	Dej Formation	Romania	Possibly a species of Pusia; a replacement name for Mitra (Costellaria) recticosta var. transsylvanica Boettger (1902).	
Pusia subpyrenaica	Sp. nov	Valid	Lozouet	Oligocene (Chattian)		France	A species of Pusia.	
Pusia virodunensis	Sp. nov	Valid	Lozouet	Oligocene (Chattian)		France	A species of Pusia.	
Pustularia korneli	Sp. nov	Valid	Fehse & Vicián	Miocene		Indonesia	A species of Pustularia.	
Pyrgiscus elegans	Sp. nov	Valid	Tabanelli et al.	Pliocene		Italy	A species of Pyrgiscus.	
Pyrgiscus jaapmulderi	Sp. nov	Valid	Landau & Micali	Pliocene		Spain	A species of Pyrgiscus.	
Pyrgulina marliesae	Sp. nov	Valid	Landau & Micali	Pliocene		Spain	A species of Pyrgulina.	
Retusa (Cylichnina) praemoryi	Sp. nov	Valid	Garvie	Paleocene (Danian)	Kincaid Formation	United States (Texas)	A species of Retusa.	
Rhaphaulus zhuoi	Sp. nov	In press	Yu, Salvador & Jarzembowski	Late Cretaceous (Cenomanian)	Burmese amber	Myanmar		
Rinaldoella tornata	Sp. nov	Valid	Karapunar & Nützel	Late Triassic	San Cassiano Formation	Italy	A member of Pleurotomariida.	
Ringicula taenia	Sp. nov	Valid	Garvie	Eocene	Cook Mountain Formation	United States (Texas)	A species of Ringicula.	
Sansonia texana	Sp. nov	Valid	Garvie	Paleocene (Danian)	Kincaid Formation	United States (Texas)		
Sassella	Gen. et 2 sp. nov	Valid	Garvie	Paleocene (Danian)	Kincaid Formation	United States (Texas)	Genus includes new species S. mixta and S. frosti.	
Scalptia nemethi	Sp. nov	Valid	Kovács & Vicián	Miocene	Lajta Formation	Hungary	A species of Scalptia.	
Scaphella kendrae	Sp. nov	Valid	Petuch & Berschauer	Pliocene (Zanclean)	Murdock Formation	United States (Florida)	A species of Scaphella.	
Schizogonium undae	Sp. nov	Valid	Karapunar & Nützel	Late Triassic	San Cassiano Formation	Italy	A member of Pleurotomariida.	
Seraphs kaindraperi	Sp. nov	Valid	Maxwell, Rymer & Congdon	Eocene (Priabonian)		Jamaica	A member of the family Seraphsidae.	
Similalvania	Gen. et comb. nov	Valid	Chirli & Forli	Pliocene		Italy	A member of the family Rissoidae. The type species is "Alvania" magistra Chirli (2006)	
Solariella microstriata	Sp. nov	Valid	Garvie	Paleocene (Danian)	Kincaid Formation	United States (Texas)	A species of Solariella.	
Solariorbis planulatis	Sp. nov	Valid	Garvie	Paleocene (Danian)	Kincaid Formation	United States (Texas)		
Squamoworthenia	Gen. et comb. nov	Valid	Mazaev	Carboniferous		Australia; Germany; Kazakhstan	Genus includes S. duponti (Holzapfel, 1889) and "Worthenia" crenilunula Yoo (1994).	
Stellaria striatissima	Sp. nov	Valid	Raven	Miocene		Malaysia	A species of Stellaria.	
Striacingulum	Gen. et comb. nov	Valid	Karapunar & Nützel				A member of Pleurotomariida. The type species is "Pleurotomaria" cancellatocingulata Klipstein (1844).	
Striaticostatum figus	Sp. nov	Valid	Garvie	Paleocene (Danian)	Kincaid Formation	United States (Texas)		
Stuckenbergispira dombarensis	Sp. nov	Valid	Mazaev	Early Carboniferous		Kazakhstan		
Sveltella novus	Sp. nov	Valid	Garvie	Paleocene (Danian)	Kincaid Formation	United States (Texas)	A species of Sveltella.	
Sveltia sofiae	Sp. nov	Valid	Landau & da Silva	Pliocene		Portugal	A species of Sveltia.	
Syrnola debrae	Sp. nov	Valid	Garvie	Eocene	Cook Mountain Formation	United States (Texas)	A species of Syrnola.	
Taioma? argilla	Sp. nov	Valid	Garvie	Paleocene (Danian)	Kincaid Formation	United States (Texas)		
Taioma calxa	Sp. nov	Valid	Garvie	Paleocene (Danian)	Kincaid Formation	United States (Texas)		
Taranis occulta	Sp. nov	Valid	Brunetti & Cresti	Pliocene		Italy	A species of Taranis.	
Teinostoma regularis	Sp. nov	Valid	Garvie	Paleocene (Danian)	Kincaid Formation	United States (Texas)	A species of Teinostoma.	
Terebellum humilispirum	Sp. nov	Valid	Raven	Miocene		Malaysia	A species of Terebellum.	
Terebra (Mirula) mexia	Sp. nov	Valid	Garvie	Paleocene (Danian)	Kincaid Formation	United States (Texas)	A species of Terebra.	
Terebrifusus megahani	Sp. nov	Valid	Garvie	Eocene	Cook Mountain Formation	United States (Texas)		
Thylacodes devriesi	Sp. nov	In press	Sanfilippo et al.	Miocene		Peru	A species of Thylacodes.	
Tornatellaea globosa	Sp. nov	Valid	Garvie	Paleocene (Danian)	Kincaid Formation	United States (Texas)		
Tornatellaea linifera	Sp. nov	Valid	Garvie	Paleocene (Danian)	Kincaid Formation	United States (Texas)		
Tripsycha strapplei	Sp. nov	Valid	Garvie	Paleocene (Danian)	Kincaid Formation	United States (Texas)		
Tritia miniridibunda	Sp. nov	Valid	Lozouet	Miocene		France	A species of Tritia.	
Tritia praebasteroti	Sp. nov	Valid	Lozouet	Oligocene (Chattian)		France	A species of Tritia.	
Tritiaria formosa	Sp. nov	Valid	Garvie	Paleocene (Danian)	Kincaid Formation	United States (Texas)		
Trivia disjuncta	Sp. nov	Valid	Fehse	Late Oligocene		France	A species of Trivia.	
Trivia simplex	Sp. nov	Valid	Fehse	Late Oligocene		France	A species of Trivia.	
Trona colossus	Sp. nov	Valid	Groves & Landau	Early–middle Miocene	Baitoa Formation	Dominican Republic	A species of Trona.	
Truncatella jiaozhouensis	Sp. nov	In press	Yu et al.	Late Cretaceous	Jiaolai Basin	China	A species of Truncatella.	
Tumidosipho	Gen. et sp. nov	Valid	Garvie	Paleocene (Danian)	Kincaid Formation	United States (Texas)	Genus includes new species T. tehuacana.	
Turbo (Marmarostoma) ishidai	Sp. nov	Valid	Tomida, Sano & Kase	Miocene	Ena Limestone	Japan	A species of Turbo.	
Turbonilla bincki	Sp. nov	Valid	Landau & Micali	Pliocene		Spain	A species of Turbonilla.	
Turbonilla bongiardinoi	Sp. nov	Valid	Landau & Micali	Pliocene		Spain	A species of Turbonilla.	
Turbonilla crovatoi	Sp. nov	Valid	Landau & Micali	Pliocene		Spain	A species of Turbonilla.	
Turbonilla malacitana	Sp. nov	Valid	Landau & Micali	Pliocene		Spain	A member of the family Pyramidellidae. Originally described as a species of Turbonilla, but subsequently transferred to the genus Aglaianilla.	
Turbonilla mauroi	Sp. nov	Valid	Landau & Micali	Pliocene		Spain	A species of Turbonilla.	
Turbonilla plioalboranensis	Sp. nov	Valid	Landau & Micali	Pliocene		Spain	A species of Turbonilla.	
Turbonilla velerinensis	Sp. nov	Valid	Landau & Micali	Pliocene		Spain	A species of Turbonilla.	
Turricula frosti	Sp. nov	Valid	Garvie	Paleocene (Danian)	Kincaid Formation	United States (Texas)	A species of Turricula.	
Turricula imbricata	Sp. nov	Valid	Garvie	Paleocene (Danian)	Kincaid Formation	United States (Texas)	A species of Turricula.	
"Turritella" calax	Sp. nov	Valid	Garvie	Paleocene (Danian)	Kincaid Formation	United States (Texas)		
Umbilia furneauxensis	Sp. nov	Valid	Southgate, Militz & Roberts	Pliocene		Australia	A species of Umbilia.	
Unitas duomillias	Sp. nov	Valid	Garvie	Eocene	Cook Mountain Formation	United States (Texas)		
Unitas euani	Sp. nov	Valid	Garvie	Paleocene (Danian)	Kincaid Formation	United States (Texas)		
Unitas petiti	Sp. nov	Valid	Garvie	Paleocene (Danian)	Kincaid Formation	United States (Texas)		
Valvata jiaolaiensis	Sp. nov	In press	Yu et al.	Late Cretaceous	Jiaolai Basin	China	A species of Valvata.	
Vanikoropsis bashforthi	Sp. nov	Valid	Schnetler & Nielsen	Paleocene (Danian)	Agatdal Formation	Greenland	Possibly a member of the family Vanikoridae.	
Vanikoropsis jakobseni	Sp. nov	Valid	Schnetler & Nielsen	Paleocene (Danian)	Agatdal Formation	Greenland	Possibly a member of the family Vanikoridae.	
Vanikoropsis mortenseni	Sp. nov	Valid	Schnetler & Nielsen	Paleocene (Selandian)	Kerteminde Marl	Denmark	Possibly a member of the family Vanikoridae.	
Varicospira bekenuensis	Sp. nov	Valid	Raven	Miocene		Malaysia	A species of Varicospira.	
Varicospira reticulata	Sp. nov	Valid	Raven	Miocene		Malaysia	A species of Varicospira.	
Vermicularia? columella	Sp. nov	Valid	Garvie	Paleocene (Danian)	Kincaid Formation	United States (Texas)		
Vexillum transalpinum	Sp. nov	Valid	Harzhauser & Landau	Miocene	Baden Formation	Austria; Hungary; Romania; Turkey	A species of Vexillum.	
Vitrinella discus	Sp. nov	Valid	Garvie	Paleocene (Danian)	Kincaid Formation	United States (Texas)	A species of Vitrinella.	
Vitrinella praelaevis	Sp. nov	Valid	Garvie	Paleocene (Danian)	Kincaid Formation	United States (Texas)	A species of Vitrinella.	
Volutifusus dougsheltoni	Sp. nov	Valid	Petuch & Berschauer	Pliocene (Piacenzian)	Tamiami Formation	United States (Florida)	A species of Volutifusus.	
Volutifusus kissimmeensis	Sp. nov	Valid	Petuch & Berschauer	Pliocene (Piacenzian)	Tamiami Formation	United States (Florida)	A species of Volutifusus.	
Volutomorpha ultima	Sp. nov	Valid	Garvie	Paleocene (Danian)	Kincaid Formation	United States (Texas)		
Wormsina	Gen. et comb. nov	Valid	Harzhauser & Landau	Miocene		Romania	A member of the family Mitridae. The type species is "Mitra (Cylindra)" transsylvanica Hoernes & Auinger (1880).	
Wortheniella klipsteini	Sp. nov	Valid	Karapunar & Nützel	Late Triassic	San Cassiano Formation	Italy	A member of Pleurotomariida.	
Wortheniella paolofedelei	Sp. nov	Valid	Karapunar & Nützel	Late Triassic	San Cassiano Formation	Italy	A member of Pleurotomariida.	
Zafrona sphaerocorrugata	Sp. nov	Valid	Harzhauser & Landau	Miocene	Baden Formation	Austria; Bosnia and Herzegovina; Bulgaria; Hungary; Romania; Ukraine	A species of Zafrona.	
Zebinella tehuacana	Sp. nov	Valid	Garvie	Paleocene (Danian)	Kincaid Formation	United States (Texas)	A species of Zebinella.	
Zonaria vokesae	Sp. nov	Valid	Groves & Landau	Early–middle Miocene	Baitoa Formation	Dominican Republic	A species of Zonaria.	

== Bivalves ==
=== New taxa ===
Name	Novelty	Status	Authors	Age	Type locality	Country	Notes	Images
Acar beadata	Sp. nov	Valid	Garvie	Paleocene (Danian)	Kincaid Formation	United States (Texas)	A species of Acar.	
Amphidonte mirkamalovi	Sp. nov	Valid	Metelkin & Kosenko	Early Cretaceous (Aptian)			An oyster.	
Arcopsis subrhombus	Sp. nov	Valid	Garvie	Paleocene (Danian)	Kincaid Formation	United States (Texas)		
Arcopsis tumulus	Sp. nov	Valid	Garvie	Paleocene (Danian)	Kincaid Formation	United States (Texas)		
Arkhanguelskya	Gen. et comb. nov	Valid	Cooper & Leanza	Cretaceous			A member of the family Buchotrigoniidae. Genus includes "Trigonia" weberi Arkhangelsky (1916).	
Baluchicardia? eoplata	Sp. nov	Valid	Garvie	Paleocene (Danian)	Kincaid Formation	United States (Texas)		
Bengtsonigonia	Nom. nov	Valid	Ceccolini & Cianferoni	Early Cretaceous	Riachuelo Formation	Brazil	A replacement name for Bengtsonella Cooper & Leanza (2019).	
Bohemigonia	Gen. et sp. et comb. nov	Valid	Cooper			Czech Republic	A member of the family Megatrigoniidae. The type species is B. frici; genus also includes "Trigonia" debuchii Geinitz (1840).	
Caryocorbula? praefigera	Sp. nov	Valid	Garvie	Paleocene (Danian)	Kincaid Formation	United States (Texas)		
Chama ferrata	Sp. nov	Valid	Berezovsky	Eocene		Ukraine	A species of Chama.	
Chama subcalcarata	Sp. nov	Valid	Berezovsky	Eocene		Ukraine	A species of Chama.	
Corbulamella palaeocenica	Sp. nov	Valid	Garvie	Paleocene (Danian)	Kincaid Formation	United States (Texas)		
Crassatellina minuta	Sp. nov	Valid	Jaitly et al.	Late Cretaceous (Turonian)	Nodular Limestone Formation	India	A member of the family Lucinidae belonging to the subfamily Eriphylinae.	
Crassatellina paleocaenica	Sp. nov	Valid	Garvie	Paleocene (Danian)	Kincaid Formation	United States (Texas)		
Cuspidaria texana	Sp. nov	Valid	Garvie	Paleocene (Danian)	Kincaid Formation	United States (Texas)	A species of Cuspidaria.	
Diplodonta frosti	Sp. nov	Valid	Garvie	Paleocene (Danian)	Kincaid Formation	United States (Texas)		
Diplodonta paleocaenica	Sp. nov	Valid	Garvie	Paleocene (Danian)	Kincaid Formation	United States (Texas)		
Dorbigonia	Gen. et comb. nov	Valid	Cooper	Cretaceous		France	A member of the family Megatrigoniidae. Genus includes "Trigonia" disparilis d'Orbigny (1844).	
Elianegonia	Nom. nov	Valid	Ceccolini & Cianferoni	Late Cretaceous		Madagascar	A replacement name for Elianella Cooper (2015).	
Eomiltha strangensis	Sp. nov	Valid	Garvie	Paleocene (Danian)	Kincaid Formation	United States (Texas)		
Eurydesma sacculum snapperensis	Ssp. nov	Valid	Waterhouse	Permian	Wandrawandian Formation	Australia	A bivalve belonging to the group Pectinida and the family Eurydesmidae.	
Freneixicardia picturata	Sp. nov	Valid	Berezovsky	Eocene		Ukraine	A cockle.	
Frenguelliella eopacifica	Sp. nov	Valid	Echevarría, Damborenea & Manceñido	Early Jurassic		Argentina	A member of Trigoniida belonging to the family Frenguelliellidae.	
Glycymeris laevigata	Sp. nov	Valid	Garvie	Paleocene (Danian)	Kincaid Formation	United States (Texas)	A species of Glycymeris.	
Grammatodon superstes	Sp. nov	Valid	Garvie	Paleocene (Danian)	Kincaid Formation	United States (Texas)		
Gregariella frosti	Sp. nov	Valid	Garvie	Paleocene (Danian)	Kincaid Formation	United States (Texas)	A species of Gregariella.	
Himenourella	Gen. et comb. nov	Valid	Cooper	Cretaceous		Japan; Russia	A member of the family Megatrigoniidae. Genus includes "Trigonia" jimbonis Strand (1928), "Trigonia" sawatai Yehara (1923), "Apiotrigonia" subjimboi Miroljubov in Vereshchagin et al. (1965) and "Trigonia" subovalis Jimbo (1894).	
Kolymia rutskovi	Sp. nov	Valid	Biakov in Biakov et al.	Permian		Russia		
Kushmurunskya	Gen. et comb. nov	Valid	Cooper	Cretaceous		Kazakhstan	A member of the family Megatrigoniidae. Genus includes "Trigonia" gladkowskii Shcheglova-Borodina (1960).	
Kyzylkumgonia	Gen. et comb. nov	Valid	Cooper	Cretaceous			A member of the family Megatrigoniidae. Genus includes "Trigonia" syrdariensis Arkhangelsky (1916), "Trigonia" turcmenensis Arkhangelsky (1916) and "Megatrigonia" tagamensis Belyakova (1980).	
Loxocardium marmoreum	Sp. nov	Valid	Berezovsky	Eocene		Ukraine	A cockle.	
Lucina crassiplica	Sp. nov	Valid	Garvie	Paleocene (Danian)	Kincaid Formation	United States (Texas)	A species of Lucina.	
Lucina multivittae	Sp. nov	Valid	Garvie	Paleocene (Danian)	Kincaid Formation	United States (Texas)	A species of Lucina.	
Lucina tehuacanensis	Sp. nov	Valid	Garvie	Paleocene (Danian)	Kincaid Formation	United States (Texas)	A species of Lucina.	
Maedagonia	Gen. et comb. et nom. nov	Valid	Cooper	Cretaceous		Japan; Russia	A member of the family Megatrigoniidae. Genus includes "Apiotrigonia" mikasaensis Tashiro (1979), "Apiotrigonia" ashizawaensis Saito (1962), "Apiotrigonia" crassoradiata Nakano (1957), "Apiotrigonia" futabaensis Maeda & Kawabe (1967), "Apiotrigonia" hetonaiana Tashiro (1978), "Apiotrigonia" hironoensis Maeda & Kawabe (1967), "Apiotrigonia" jimboi Nakano (1957), "Apiotrigonia" obliquecostata Nakano (1957), "Apiotrigonia" obsoleta Nakano (1957), "Apiotrigonia" orikiensis Maeda & Kawabe (1967), "Apiotrigonia" undulosa Nakano (1957) and "Apiotrigonia" utoensis Tashiro (1972), as well as M. yabei (a replacement name for Trigonia subovalis var. minor Yabe & Nagao, 1925).	
Martesia mazanticus	Sp. nov	Valid	Castañeda-Posadas, Trujillo-Hernández & Zúñiga-Mijangos	Miocene	Mexican amber	Mexico	A species of Martesia.	
Matsudagonia	Gen. et comb. nov	Valid	Cooper	Cretaceous		Japan	A member of the family Megatrigoniidae. Genus includes "Apiotrigonia" dubia Tashiro (1979).	
Moerickella	Gen. nov	Valid	Echevarría, Damborenea & Manceñido	Early Jurassic		Argentina	A member of Trigoniida, most likely the oldest member of the family Myophorellidae.	
Naiadites devonicus	Sp. nov	Valid	Scholze & Gess	Devonian (Famennian)	Witpoort Formation	South Africa		
Opis reticulata	Sp. nov	Valid	Jaitly et al.	Late Cretaceous (Turonian)	Nodular Limestone Formation	India	A member of the family Lucinidae belonging to the subfamily Opinae.	
Ostrea jibananandai	Sp. nov	Valid	Halder & Mitra	Eocene (Ypresian)	Cambay Shale	India	A species of Ostrea.	
Palaeolignopholas	Gen. et sp. nov	Valid	Bolotov et al.	Late Cretaceous (Cenomanian)	Burmese amber	Myanmar	A member of the family Pholadidae belonging to the subfamily Martesiinae. The type species is P. kachinensis.	
Pandora? paleocenica	Sp. nov	Valid	Garvie	Paleocene (Danian)	Kincaid Formation	United States (Texas)		
Parmicorbula? sublaevis	Sp. nov	Valid	Garvie	Paleocene (Danian)	Kincaid Formation	United States (Texas)		
Perezigonia	Nom. nov	Valid	Ceccolini & Cianferoni	Middle Jurassic		Chile	A replacement name for Perezella Cooper (2015).	
Pojetaia robsonae	Sp. nov	Valid	Peel & Skovsted	Cambrian Stage 4	Kane Basin Formation	Canada (Nunavut)		
Porterius? strangensis	Sp. nov	Valid	Garvie	Paleocene (Danian)	Kincaid Formation	United States (Texas)		
Poultoniella	Gen. et comb. nov	Valid	Cooper	Cretaceous		Canada (British Columbia)	A member of the family Megatrigoniidae. Genus includes "Trigonia" newcombei Packard (1921).	
Promyophorella basoaltorum	Sp. nov	Valid	Echevarría, Damborenea & Manceñido	Early Jurassic		Argentina	A member of Trigoniida belonging to the family Myophorellidae.	
Promyophorella? sanjuanina	Sp. nov	Valid	Echevarría, Damborenea & Manceñido	Early Jurassic		Argentina	A member of Trigoniida belonging to the family Myophorellidae.	
Pseudapiotrigonia	Gen. et comb. nov	Valid	Cooper			United States (South Dakota; Utah)	A member of the family Vaugoniidae. Genus includes "Trigonia" sturgisensis Whitfield & Hovey (1906), as well as "Vaugonia" utahensis Imlay (1964).	
Pseudovaugonia	Gen. nov	Valid	Echevarría, Damborenea & Manceñido	Early Jurassic		Argentina	A member of Trigoniida belonging to the family Myophorellidae.	
Pteromeris nodulina	Sp. nov	Valid	Garvie	Paleocene (Danian)	Kincaid Formation	United States (Texas)	A species of Pteromeris.	
Repmanigonia	Nom. nov	Valid	Ceccolini & Cianferoni	Jurassic		Russia	A replacement name for Repmania Kolesnikov (1980).	
Schedocardia imperfecta	Sp. nov	Valid	Berezovsky	Eocene		Ukraine	A cockle.	
Sinoliaoningia	Nom. nov	Valid	Ceccolini & Cianferoni	Late Triassic	Yangcaogou Formation	China	A replacement name for Liaoningia Yu & Dong (1993).	
Sokolovskya	Gen. et comb. nov	Valid	Cooper				A member of the family Megatrigoniidae. Genus includes "Apiotrigonia" levinae Pojarkova (1990) and "Apiotrigonia" khoresmensis Belyakova (1965).	
Sonoragonia	Gen. et comb. et nom. nov	Valid	Cooper	Early Cretaceous	Lowell Formation	United States (Arizona)	A member of the family Megatrigoniidae. Genus includes "Trigonia" cragini Stoyanow (1949), as well as S. scotti (a replacement name for Trigonia kitchini Stoyanow, 1949).	
Sphenotomorpha orientalis	Sp. nov	Valid	Dalenz Farjat	Devonian (Pragian)	Icla Formation	Bolivia	A member of Modiomorphida belonging to the family Modiomorphidae.	
Sunetta crassatelliformis	Sp. nov	Valid	Haga & Fukuda in Fukuda et al.	Early Pleistocene		Japan	A species of Sunetta.	
Sunetta nomurai	Sp. nov	Valid	Haga & Fukuda in Fukuda et al.	Pleistocene		Taiwan	A species of Sunetta.	
Syndesmyella pliominor	Sp. nov	Valid	Brunetti & Cresti	Early Pliocene		Spain	A member of the family Semelidae.	
Tellina brevis	Sp. nov	Valid	Garvie	Paleocene (Danian)	Kincaid Formation	United States (Texas)	A species of Tellina.	
Terrypoultoniella	Gen. et sp. nov	Valid	Echevarría, Damborenea & Manceñido	Early Jurassic (Pliensbachian–Toarcian)		Argentina; Portugal?	A member of Trigoniida belonging to the family Frenguelliellidae. The type species is "Poultoniella" jaworskii Echevarría, Damborenea & Manceñido (2021); genus might also include "Trigonia" malladae Choffat (1885).	
Tindaria hamuroi	Sp. nov	Valid	Amano & Haga	Miocene	Higashibessho Formation	Japan	A member of the family Tindariidae.	
Titomaya	Gen. et comb. et sp. nov	Valid	Alvarez & del Río	Paleocene (Danian)	Lefipán Formation; Salamanca Formation	Argentina	A member of Venerida belonging to the group Veneroidea. Genus includes "Meretrix" chalcedonica, as well as new species T. longobucca.	
Tivelina texana	Sp. nov	Valid	Garvie	Paleocene (Danian)	Kincaid Formation	United States (Texas)		
Tivelina trigonalis	Sp. nov	Valid	Garvie	Paleocene (Danian)	Kincaid Formation	United States (Texas)		
Unionites kobyumensis	Sp. nov	Valid	Biakov in Biakov & Kutygin	Late Permian		Russia		
Vaccinites alencasteri	Sp. nov	Valid	Mitchell	Late Cretaceous (probably late Turonian or early Coniacian)	Cuautla Formation	Mexico	A rudist bivalve.	
Vaccinites temazcali	Sp. nov	Valid	Mitchell	Late Cretaceous (Campanian)	Temazcal Limestone	Mexico	A rudist bivalve.	
Villamilia	Gen. et comb. nov	Valid	Cooper & Leanza	Cretaceous		Colombia	A member of the family Buchotrigoniidae. Genus includes "Buchotrigonia" etayoi Villamil (1992), "Trigonia" humboldtii Buch (1839), "Buchotrigonia" kauffmani Villamil (1992), "Buchotrigonia" perezi Villamil (1992) and "Vaugonia niranohamensis" santamariae Geyer (1973; raised to the rank of the species V. santamariae).	
Weyla santuccii	Sp. nov	Valid	Damborenea et al.	Early Jurassic (Hettangian)	Pogibshi Formation	United States (Alaska)	A scallop.	
Whitfieldiella luceae	Sp. nov	Valid	Mitchell	Late Cretaceous (Campanian)	Clifton Limestone; Cotui Limestone	Jamaica; United States (Puerto Rico)	A rudist bivalve.	
Yunannia	Gen. et 2 sp. nov	Valid	Zhang & Niu in Zhang et al.	Ordovician	Dongchong Formation	China	A member of Pteriomorphia of uncertain phylogenetic placement. The type species is Y. gankengensis; genus also includes Y. yunkaiensis.	

=== Research ===
- A study on the evolution and possible causes of the extinction of alatoconchid bivalves is published by Chen et al. (2021).
- A study on the arcoid bivalve diversity during the Eocene doubthouse interval of global climate cooling is published by Hickman (2021).

== Other molluscs ==
Name	Novelty	Status	Authors	Age	Type locality	Country	Notes	Images
Anabarella? navaranae	Sp. nov	Valid	Peel	Cambrian Stage 4	Aftenstjernesø Formation	Greenland		
Cadulus praepalmerae	Sp. nov	Valid	Garvie	Paleocene (Danian)	Kincaid Formation	United States (Texas)	A tusk shell, a species of Cadulus.	
Catalanispira prima	Sp. nov	Valid	Ebbestad & Cope	Ordovician (Floian)		United Kingdom	A member of the family Onychochilidae.	
Figurina? polaris	Sp. nov	Valid	Peel	Cambrian Stage 4	Aftenstjernesø Formation	Greenland	A helcionellid. Subsequently made the type species of a separate genus Sermeqiconus.	
Hippopharangites groenlandicus	Sp. nov	Valid	Peel	Cambrian Stage 4	Aftenstjernesø Formation	Greenland	A member of the stem group of Aculifera.	
Inughuitoconus	Gen. et sp. nov	Valid	Peel	Cambrian Stage 4	Aftenstjernesø Formation	Greenland	A member of the stem group of Aculifera. Genus includes new species I. borealis.	
Lepidozona luzanovkensis	Sp. nov	Valid	Sirenko	Paleocene	Luzanovka Beds	Ukraine	A chiton, a species of Lepidozona.	
Minodentalium	Gen. et 2 sp. et comb. nov	Valid	Asato & Kase	Permian	Akasaka Limestone	Belgium; Japan; New Zealand; United States	A tusk shell. Genus includes new species M. hayasakai and M. okumurai, as well as "Plagioglypta" furcata Waterhouse (1980), "Pl." girtyi Knight (1940), "Pl." subannulata Easton (1962), "Dentalium" ingens De Koninck (1843), "D." meekianum Geinitz (1866), "Pl." prosseri Morningstar (1922), "Dentalium" priscum Münster in Goldfuss (1842) and "D." herculeum De Koninck (1863).	
Ocruranus? kangerluk	Sp. nov	Valid	Peel	Cambrian Stage 4	Aftenstjernesø Formation	Greenland	A member of the stem group of Aculifera.	
Prodentalium onoi	Sp. nov	Valid	Asato & Kase	Permian	Akasaka Limestone	Japan	A tusk shell.	
Progadilinoides	Gen. et sp. nov	Valid	Guzhov	Early Cretaceous (Aptian)		Russia	A tusk shell belonging to the family Pulsellidae. The type species is P. balakovensis.	
Pseudomyona groenlandica	Sp. nov	Valid	Peel	Cambrian (Drumian)	Fimbuldal Formation	Greenland	A member of Rostroconchia belonging to the group Tuarangiida and the family Tuarangiidae.	
Qingjianglepas	Gen. et sp. nov	In press	Li et al.	Cambrian		China	A minute limpet-shaped shell, probably belonging to a helcionelloid. Genus includes new species Q. elegans.	
Stenotheca? higginsi	Sp. nov	Valid	Peel	Cambrian Stage 4	Aftenstjernesø Formation	Greenland		
Totornatus	Gen. et sp. nov	Valid	Zhang et al.	Cambrian (Fortunian)		China	A maikhanellid. Genus includes new species T. strigatus.	

== General research ==
- A study on the relationship between temperature and diversity in the fossil record of marine molluscs over the last 145 million years is published by Boag, Gearty & Stockey (2021).
- A study on the relationship between the species richness of shallow-marine molluscs, the number of ecological functional groups, and oceanic temperature in the fossil record of New Zealand over the last ~40 million years is published by Womack et al. (2021).
