= Kourazouceras =

Kourazouceras Temporal range: Late Devonian

Scientific classification
- Domain: Eukaryota
- Kingdom: Animalia
- Phylum: Mollusca
- Class: Cephalopoda
- Subclass: †Ammonoidea
- Order: †Goniatitida
- Family: †Tornoceratidae
- Subfamily: †Falcitornoceratinae
- Genus: †Kourazouceras; Backer, 2002

Species
- See text

Extinct genus of molluscs

Kourazouceras is an extinct ammonoid genus from the Late Devonian assigned to the tornoceratid subfamily Falcitornoceratinae. As such it is related to Falcitornoceras, Gundolficeras, and Phoenixites.

Kourazouceras was named by Backer in 2002 and is the latest genus to be added to the goniatitid subfamily Falcitornoceratinae.
