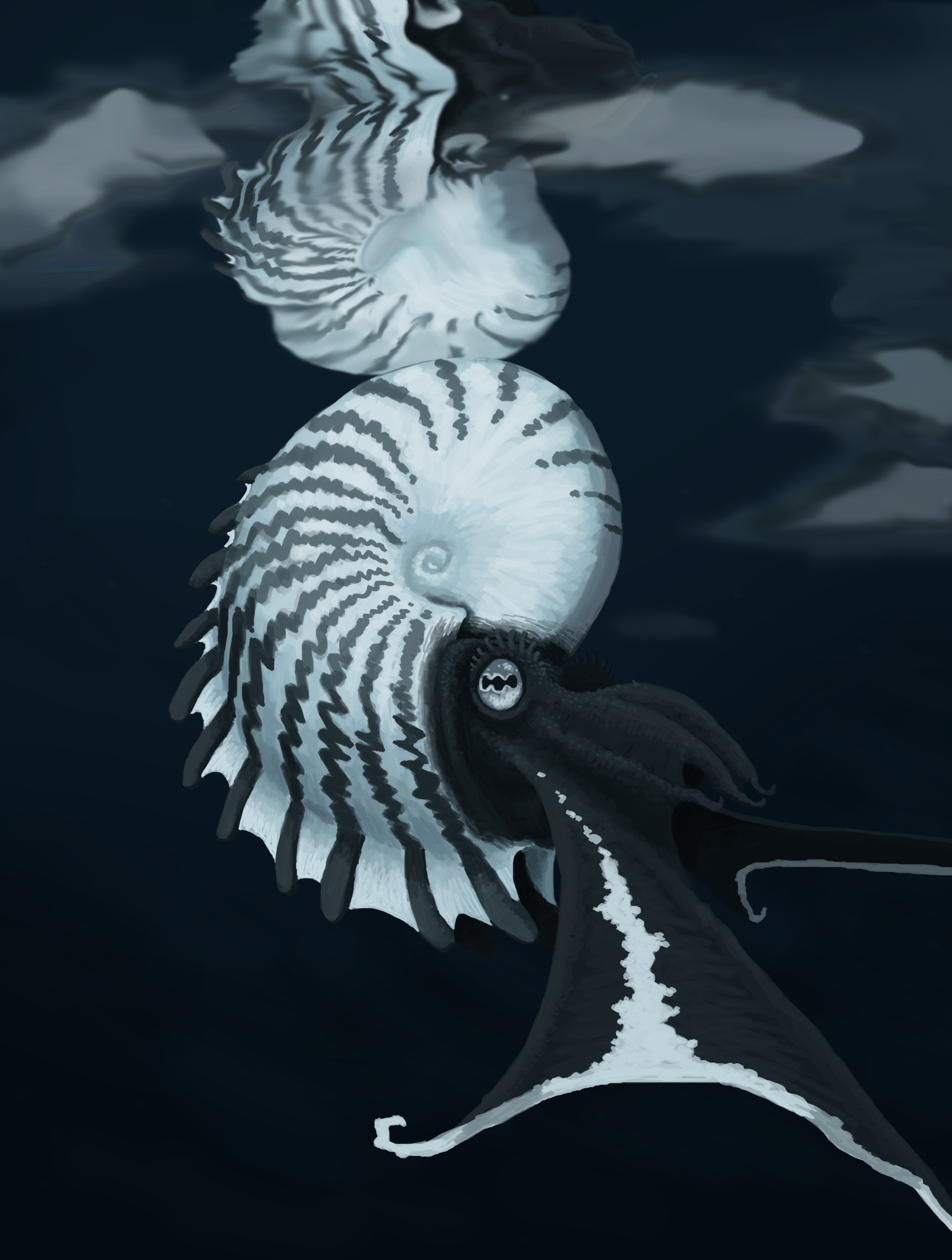
- Life reconstruction of Armatites kaufmanni

Scientific classification
- Domain: Eukaryota
- Kingdom: Animalia
- Phylum: Mollusca
- Class: Cephalopoda
- Subclass: †Ammonoidea
- Order: †Goniatitida
- Family: †Tornoceratidae
- Subfamily: †Aulatornoceratinae
- Genus: †Armatites; Becker, 1993

Species
- See text

= Armatites =

Armatites Temporal range: Famennian

Extinct genus of molluscs

Armatites is an Upper Devonian goniatitid included in the tornoceratid family. The shell, or conch, is discoidal, with flattened flanks, a flattened venter with a double keel, and a deep ventral sinus, but without ventrolateral grooves. The lateral saddle of the suture is broad. Armatites is known from the Upper Devonian (Fammenian) of Canning Basin in Australia. The subfamily in which it is included, the Aulatornoceratinae is also known from France with the genus Aulatornoceras.

In terms of nomenclature Armatites started as Pseudoclymenia by Wedekind in 1918, became Tornoceras (Polonoceras) by Glenister in 1958, simply Polonoceras by Bogoslovskii, 1971, and finally Armatites by Becker in 1993.
