= Polonoceras =

Polonoceras Temporal range: Famennian

Scientific classification
- Domain: Eukaryota
- Kingdom: Animalia
- Phylum: Mollusca
- Class: Cephalopoda
- Subclass: †Ammonoidea
- Order: †Goniatitida
- Family: †Tornoceratidae
- Subfamily: †Aulatornoceratinae
- Genus: †Polonoceras; Dybczynski, 1913

Species
- See text

Extinct genus of molluscs

Polonoceras is a genus included in the goniatitid subfamily Aulatornoceratinae named by Dybczynski, 1913. The type species is Polonoceras planum Dybczynski. According to Miller, et al. in the American Treatise on Invertebrate Paleontology, 1957, Polonoceras is a subgenus of Tornoceras.

Polonoceras, which lived during the Late Devonian, has an involute or moderately evolute, discoidal shell with a high aperture and flattened, grooved venter. The adventitious lobe, next to the ventral lobe, is widely rounded, the Ventro-lateral saddle narrow and sometimes higher than lateral saddle.

Polonoceras is found in Europe, in Poland, where it was discovered. It is also reported from Upper Devonian (middle Famennian) in Canning Basin, Western Australia.
