= Planitornoceras =

Planitornoceras Temporal range: Famennian

Scientific classification
- Domain: Eukaryota
- Kingdom: Animalia
- Phylum: Mollusca
- Class: Cephalopoda
- Subclass: †Ammonoidea
- Order: †Goniatitida
- Family: †Tornoceratidae
- Subfamily: †Aulatornoceratinae
- Genus: †Planitornoceras; Becker, 1995

Species
- See text

Extinct genus of molluscs

Planitornoceras is a genus included in the goniatitid subfamily Aulatornoceratinae that lived during the Famennian stage at the end of the Devonian. Its shell is extremely compressed, subinvolute to subevolute with an open umbilicus. Sides are always flat, outer rim (=venter) tabulate to slightly keeled. No constrictions or spiral grooves, but some species have broad spiral depressions. The adventitious lobe of the suture is widely rounded and asymmetric, the ventral lobe and saddle small, the dorsolateral saddle relatively short.
