= Domanikoceras =

Domanikoceras Temporal range: 383.3–381.6 Ma

Scientific classification
- Domain: Eukaryota
- Kingdom: Animalia
- Phylum: Mollusca
- Class: Cephalopoda
- Subclass: †Ammonoidea
- Order: †Goniatitida
- Family: †Tornoceratidae
- Subfamily: †Tornoceratinae
- Genus: †Domanikoceras; Becker & House, 1993

Type species
- D. timidum Becker & House, 1993

Species
- see text

Extinct genus of molluscs

Domanikoceras is monospecific genus of ammonoids that lived during the lower Frasnian stage of upper Devonian period and was named after Domanic Suite in the Timan (Russia). Compressed and smooth shell of these ammonoids had closed umbilicus. Suture was the same as in the gase of genus Tornoceras, while growth lines were similar to Cheiloceratidae, as they were strictly convex. The only species belonging to this genus is D. timidum and its name has been derived from Latin word timid (shy) because course of its aperture has protecting course.
