= Phoenixites =

Phoenixites Temporal range: Late Devonian

Scientific classification
- Domain: Eukaryota
- Kingdom: Animalia
- Phylum: Mollusca
- Class: Cephalopoda
- Subclass: †Ammonoidea
- Order: †Goniatitida
- Family: †Tornoceratidae
- Subfamily: †Falcitornoceratinae
- Genus: †Phoenixites; Becker, 1995

Species
- See text

Extinct genus of molluscs

Phoenixites is an early (Late Devonian) genus of the Falcitornoceratinae, a subfamily of the goniatitid Tornoceratidae family. This genus was named by Becker in 1995. The type species is "Tornoceras" frechi.

The shell of Phoenixites is discoidal, on which constrictions may be present. Growth lines are strongly biconvex in juvenile stages, later with shallow a lateral sinus.

Phoenixites may have contained the ancestor of Falcitornoceras which likely gave rise to Gundolficeras, all members of the Falcitornoceratinae.

== Biostratigraphic significance ==
The International Commission on Stratigraphy (ICS) has assigned the First Appearance Datum of Phoenixites frechi as the defining biological marker for the start of the Famennian Stage, 372.2 ± 1.6 million years ago, the final stage of the Devonian. This lower limit is also defined by the Upper Kellwasser Extinction, when the conodont genera Ancyrodella, and Ozarkodina and many species of Palmatolepis, Polygnathus, and Ancyrognathus disappeared.
