= Unquatornoceras =

Unquatornoceras Temporal range: Late Devonian

Scientific classification
- Domain: Eukaryota
- Kingdom: Animalia
- Phylum: Mollusca
- Class: Cephalopoda
- Subclass: †Ammonoidea
- Order: †Goniatitida
- Family: †Tornoceratidae
- Genus: †Unquatornoceras

Genus of molluscs (fossil)

Unquatornoceras is an extinct cephalopod genus from the Late Devonian belonging to the ammonoid order Goniatitida.
