= Truyolsoceras =

Truyolsoceras Temporal range: Late Devonian

Scientific classification
- Domain: Eukaryota
- Kingdom: Animalia
- Phylum: Mollusca
- Class: Cephalopoda
- Subclass: †Ammonoidea
- Order: †Goniatitida
- Family: †Tornoceratidae
- Subfamily: †Aulatornoceratinae
- Genus: †Truyolsoceras; Montesinos, 1987

Species
- See text

Extinct genus of ammonites

Truyolsoceras is an Upper Devonian ammonite (subclass Ammonoidea) included in the goniatitid subfamily Aulatornoceratinae. The shell is involute, lenticular, with a narrow umbilicus and moderately high aperture. The adventitious lobe of the suture, which lies between the ventral and lateral lobes, is rounded.
