= Linguatornoceras =

Linguatornoceras Temporal range: 385.3–367.6 Ma

Scientific classification
- Domain: Eukaryota
- Kingdom: Animalia
- Phylum: Mollusca
- Class: Cephalopoda
- Subclass: †Ammonoidea
- Order: †Goniatitida
- Family: †Tornoceratidae
- Subfamily: †Tornoceratinae
- Genus: †Linguatornoceras; House, 1965

Type species
- Goniatites retrorsus lingua Sandberger & Sandberger, 1851

Species
- L. clausum Glenister, 1958; L. guestfalicum Frech, 1897; L. haugi Frech, 1902; L. lingua Sandberger, 1851; L. pompeckji Wedekind, 1918; L. yudinae Becker, 2000

Extinct genus of molluscs

Linguatornoceras is genus of ammonoids that lived during Devonian period. Animals belonging to this genus had discoidal shells with no umbilicus and moderately high aperture. On the venter, conch is rounded or flattened. There might be ventro-lateral grooves and constrictions. Growth lines are biconvex. Suture has deep adventitious lobe which is closely tongue-shaped and subacute. Their fossils were found in Australia, Germany and Russia.
