= Sunrise Formation =

Geologic formation in Nevada, United States

- Stratigraphic range: Hettangian-Sinemurian; ~201–191 Ma
- Type: Formation
- Sub-units: Ferguson Hill & New York Canyon members
- Overlies: Gabbs Formation

Lithology
- Primary: Limestone
- Other: Shale, siltstone, sandstone

Location
- Coordinates: 38.5°N 118.1°W
- Approximate paleocoordinates: 19.5°N 56.2°W
- Region: Nevada
- Country: United States
- Extent: Gabbs Valley Range
- Sunrise Formation (the United States) Sunrise Formation (Nevada)

The Sunrise Formation is a geologic formation in Nevada. It preserves fossils dating back to the Hettangian to Sinemurian stages of the Early Jurassic period.

== Fossil content ==
Among others, the following fossils have been reported from the formation:

Ammonites

- Alsatites proaries
- Arnioceras ritterbushi
- A. sparsum
- Coroniceras involutum
- C. luningense
- Guexiceras profundus
- Tipperoceras mullerense
- Tmaegoceras nudaries

Bivalves

- Agerchlamys boellingi
- Jaworskiella siemonmulleri
- Trigonia aff. hemisphaerica
- Vaugonia cf. vancouverensis
- Frenguelliella sp.

Echinoids

- Plesiechinus hawkinsi

== See also ==
- List of fossiliferous stratigraphic units in Nevada
- Paleontology in Nevada
