= Falcitornoceratinae =

Falcitornoceratinae Temporal range: 376.1–360.7 Ma

Scientific classification
- Domain: Eukaryota
- Kingdom: Animalia
- Phylum: Mollusca
- Class: Cephalopoda
- Subclass: †Ammonoidea
- Order: †Goniatitida
- Family: †Tornoceratidae
- Subfamily: †Falcitornoceratinae; Becker, 1993

Genera
- Falcitornoceras; Gundolficeras; Kourazouceras; Phoenixites

Extinct subfamily of molluscs

Falcitornoceratinae is one of three subfamilies of the Tornoceratidae family, a member of the Goniatitida order. Shells produced are extremely involute and have no umbilicus. Young and intermediate whorls have ventrolateral grooves. The adventitious lobe, which develops ontogenetically between the external, or ventral, and lateral lobes, is widely rounded. Tornoceratids in which the Falcitornoceratinae are included are involute, subdiscoidal, with sutures that form 6 to 10 lobes.
