= Crassotornoceras =

Crassotornoceras Temporal range: Upper Devonian

Scientific classification
- Domain: Eukaryota
- Kingdom: Animalia
- Phylum: Mollusca
- Class: Cephalopoda
- Subclass: †Ammonoidea
- Order: †Goniatitida
- Family: †Tornoceratidae
- Subfamily: †Tornoceratinae
- Genus: †Crassotornoceras; House & Price 1985

Type species
- Tornoceras ausavense crassum Matern, 1931

Species
- C. annissi House & Price, 1985; C. crassum Matern, 1931; C. nitidum Becker, 1993; ?C. isolatum Becker, 1993

Extinct genus of molluscs

Crassotornoceras is genus of ammonoids that lived during Upper Devonian period, from the base of Frasnian age until the base of Maenecoceras subvaricatum zone. Animals belonging to this genus had small subglobular conches with thin umbilicus. These were maybe ornamented by ribs and had biconvex growth lines. Suture had small, tongue-like adventitious lobe. Their fossils were found in United Kingdom, Germany, France, Belgium and Morocco.
