= Aulatornoceratinae =

Aulatornoceratinae Temporal range: Frasnian - Famennian

Scientific classification
- Domain: Eukaryota
- Kingdom: Animalia
- Phylum: Mollusca
- Class: Cephalopoda
- Subclass: †Ammonoidea
- Order: †Goniatitida
- Family: †Tornoceratidae
- Subfamily: †Aulatornoceratinae; Becker, 1993

Genera
- Armatites; Aulatornoceras; Planitornoceras; Polonoceras; Truyolsoceras

Extinct subfamily of molluscs

Aulatornoceratinae is one of three subfamilies of the goniatitid family Tornoceratidae, an extinct order of Paleozoic ammonoid cephalopods. Aulotornoceratinae was established as a subfamily by R.T.Becker, 1993, initially for Aulatornoceras, named by Schindewolf, 1922. Subsequently, four other genera have been added.

Members (genera) of the Aulotornoceratinae are known from the Late/Upper Devonian of Western Australia and Alsace, France. In France their fossils are found in well bedded pelagic (deep ocean) limy mudstones, Frasnian in age, with a paleolatatude of about 32° south. Current latitude is 43.4° N. In Western Australia, in Canning Basin, they are found in Frasnian and Famennian, (Upper Devonian), marginal slope and basinal facies related to reef complexes. Paleolatitudes are about 20° S. Current latitude is 18.0° S.

Shells of the type genus Aulatornoceras are involute, widely to narrowly umbilicate, with strongly biconvex growth lines. The suture is goniatitic.
