= Tornoceratinae =

Scientific classification
- Kingdom: Animalia
- Phylum: Mollusca
- Class: Cephalopoda
- Subclass: †Ammonoidea
- Order: †Goniatitida
- Family: †Tornoceratidae
- Subfamily: †Tornoceratinae; Arthaber 1911

Genera
- Crassotornoceras; Domanikoceras; Epitornoceras; Kourazoceras; Linguatornoceras; Lobotornoceras; Oxytornoceras; Simicheiloceras; Tornoceras

Extinct subfamily of molluscs

Tornoceratinae is one of three subfamilies of the Tornoceratidae family, a member of the Goniatitida order. They are an extinct group of ammonoid, which are shelled cephalopods related to squids, belemnites, octopuses, and cuttlefish, and more distantly to the nautiloids.
