= Hippopharangites =

Scientific classification
- Kingdom: Animalia
- Phylum: Mollusca
- Family: †Halkieriidae
- Genus: †Hippopharangites

Type species
- Hippopharangites dailyi

Species
- H. dailyi; H. groenlandicus

Extinct genus of molluscs

Hippopharangites is a genus of sachitid.

== Description ==
Hippopharangites is a form genus of triangular sclerite. Hippopharangites sclerites have a broad central cavity and small pores opening through the shell wall, equivalent to the lateral chambers of other halkieriids (and the aesthete canals of Chitons?) As the animals grew, the shell plates grew by adding material to the outer edges.

== Significance ==
This genus is the closest in form to Chancelloriid sclerites, and is thus used to support the union of halkieriids and chancelloriids as Coeloscleritophora.
