= Gabbs Formation =

Geologic formation in Nevada, United States

- Stratigraphic range: Norian-Hettangian; ~225–199 Ma
- Type: Formation
- Unit of: Volcano Peak Group
- Sub-units: Nun Mine, Mount Hyatt & Muller Canyon Members
- Underlies: Sunrise Formation
- Overlies: Luning Formation

Lithology
- Primary: Siltstone, limestone
- Other: Mudstone

Location
- Coordinates: 38.5°N 118.1°W
- Approximate paleocoordinates: 18.1°N 55.7°W
- Region: Nevada
- Country: United States

Type section
- Named for: Gabbs Valley Range
- Named by: Muller & Ferguson
- Year defined: 1939
- Gabbs Formation (the United States) Gabbs Formation (Nevada)

The Gabbs Formation is a geologic formation in Nevada. It preserves fossils dating back to the Late Triassic and Early Jurassic periods, and is one of the few formations in the United States known to include the Triassic-Jurassic boundary. In 2007, an exposure of the Gabbs Formation at New York Canyon was proposed a candidate GSSP for the Hettangian stage, the first stage of the Jurassic. However, the New York Canyon section was ultimately not selected as Hettangian GSSP, which instead went to the Kuhjoch section (Kendlbach Formation) of Austria in 2010.

== Fossil content ==
The Gabbs Formation hosts several diverse assemblages of ammonites, bivalves, and other invertebrates. In 2021, several ammonites were newly described from the formation:

- Arcestes lawsi
- Paracochloceras nunminensis
- Peripleurites gabbensis
- Placites heggi
- Rhacophyllites mulleri
- R. volcanoensis

== See also ==
- List of fossiliferous stratigraphic units in Nevada
- Paleontology in Nevada
