= Fedosovia =

Scientific classification
- Kingdom: Animalia
- Phylum: Mollusca
- Class: Gastropoda
- Subclass: Caenogastropoda
- Order: Neogastropoda
- Family: Costellariidae
- Genus: †Fedosovia; Harzhauser & Landau, 2021

Extinct genus of sea snails

Fedosovia is a genus of extinct sea snails, marine gastropod molluscs in the family Costellariidae.

== Description ==
The shells of the family of this genus are fusiform, elongate-fusiform, or even turriform. It has highly defined axial elements and a very narrow aperture, with three to four folds in the columella.

Species within this genus were predatory.

== Species ==
Species within the genus Fedosovia include:

- Fedosovia fuchsi R. Hoernes & Auinger, 1880
- Fedosovia multigranosa Vera-Peláez, 2002
- Fedosovia zibinica Toldo, 1889
