= Amphidromus ubaldii =

Scientific classification
- Kingdom: Animalia
- Phylum: Mollusca
- Class: Gastropoda
- Order: Stylommatophora
- Family: Camaenidae
- Genus: Amphidromus
- Species: †A. ubaldii

Binomial name
- †Amphidromus ubaldii Dharma, 2021

Species of tree snail

Amphidromus ubaldii is an extinct species of air-breathing tree snail, an arboreal gastropod mollusk in the family Camaenidae.

== Distribution ==
This extinct species is endemic to Java, Indonesia.
