= Falcitornoceras =

Falcitornoceras Temporal range: Famennian

Scientific classification
- Domain: Eukaryota
- Kingdom: Animalia
- Phylum: Mollusca
- Class: Cephalopoda
- Subclass: †Ammonoidea
- Order: †Goniatitida
- Family: †Tornoceratidae
- Subfamily: †Falcitornoceratinae
- Genus: †Falcitornoceras; House & Price, 1985

Species
- Falcitornoceras bilobatum

Genus of molluscs (fossil)

Falcitornoceras is a goniatitid ammonite from the Late Devonian, early Famennian, that has been found in France and Spain. Falcitornoceras was named by House and Price, 1985, and is the type genus for the subfamily Falcitornoceratinae.

The shell of Falcitornoceras is strongly involute, lacking an umbilicus. Juvenile stages have falcate ribs which cross the ventral rim; the ventro-lateral area bears weak to strong furrows. The adventitious lobe, high on the flank, is rounded or subacute and the lateral lobe has an inconspicuous saddle at the umbilical seam.

Falcitornoceras is slightly older than Gundolficeras and somewhat younger than Phoenixites, close relatives, although temporally overlapping both.

== Distribution ==
Devonian of France, Poland and Spain.
