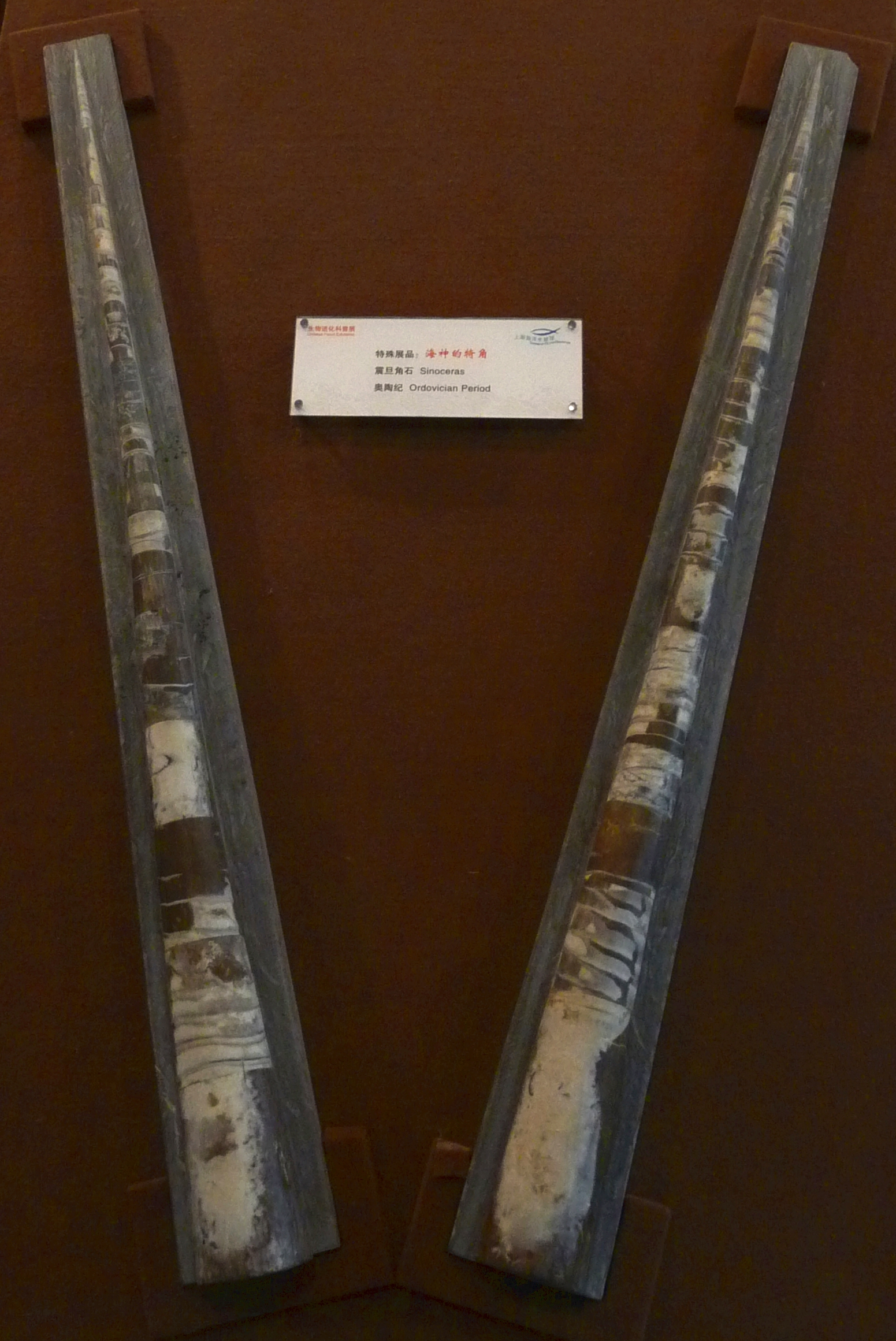

Scientific classification
- Kingdom: Animalia
- Phylum: Mollusca
- Class: Cephalopoda
- Order: †Orthocerida
- Family: †Orthoceratidae
- Genus: †Sinoceras; Shimizu & Obata, 1935

Type species
- Orthoceras chinense Shimizu & Obata, 1935

= Sinoceras =

Sinoceras Temporal range: Middle Ordovician–Devonian

Genus of molluscs (fossil)

Sinoceras is an extinct genus of nautiloids from China included in the family Orthoceratidae that lived from the middle Ordovician until the Devonian. The type species, S. chinense, was originally described as "Orthoceras chinense," but then was promoted by Shimizu and Obata to its own genus, Sinoceras, in 1935.

The shell of Sinoceras is like Michelinoceras in that it has a slender orthoconic shell but the camerae are shorter and septal necks proportionally longer, reaching nearly a third the camera length. The surface in some is marked either by very fine irregular striae or by sinuous transverse growth bands. Doubtfully distinct from Michelinoceras.
