= Prodentalium =

Prodentalium Temporal range: Devonian–Permian

Scientific classification
- Kingdom: Animalia
- Phylum: Mollusca
- Class: Scaphopoda
- Order: incertae sedis
- Genus: †Prodentalium

Extinct genus of molluscs

Prodentalium is a genus of fossil scaphopod assigned to the Dentalids, but on somewhat dubious grounds.
