= Ostrea jibananandai =

Ostrea jibananandai Temporal range: Ypresian

Scientific classification
- Domain: Eukaryota
- Kingdom: Animalia
- Phylum: Mollusca
- Class: Bivalvia
- Order: Ostreida
- Family: Ostreidae
- Genus: Ostrea
- Species: †O. jibananandai

Binomial name
- †Ostrea jibananandai Halder & Mitra, 2021

Extinct species of mollusc

Ostrea jibananandai is an extinct species of Ostrea that lived during the Ypresian stage of the Palaeogene period.

== Palaeobiology ==
Ostrea jibananandai dwarf males have been found attached inside the anterior end of the hinge of large females, representing the earliest occurrence of facultative monogamy in oysters. This behaviour, which reduces evolutionary flexibility, is believed to have evolved in response to the hyperthermal events of the Early Eocene.
