= Gundolficeras =

Gundolficeras Temporal range: Famennian

Scientific classification
- Kingdom: Animalia
- Phylum: Mollusca
- Class: Cephalopoda
- Subclass: †Ammonoidea
- Order: †Goniatitida
- Family: †Tornoceratidae
- Subfamily: †Falcitornoceratinae
- Genus: †Gundolficeras; Becker, 1995

Species
- See text

Extinct genus of ammonites

Gundolficeras is member of the Tornoceratidae, (goniatitid ammonites), from the Late Devonian named by Becker, 1995 and assigned to the Falcitornoceratinae. The type species is "Lobotornoceras" bicaniculatum.

Gundolficeras has a compressed or somewhat inflated shell that may have ventrolateral furrows and an open or closed umbilicus at medium stages. The suture has a small ventral lobe and on either side, a narrow, asymmetric, rounded or pointed adventitious lobe and a high saddle located mid-flank.

Gundolficeras differs from its partly contemporary, but slightly older relative Falcitornoceras in the details of the suture and in sometimes having an open umbilicus.
