= Aulatornoceras =

Aulatornoceras Temporal range: 383.7–376.1 Ma

Scientific classification
- Domain: Eukaryota
- Kingdom: Animalia
- Phylum: Mollusca
- Class: Cephalopoda
- Subclass: †Ammonoidea
- Order: †Goniatitida
- Family: †Tornoceratidae
- Subfamily: †Aulatornoceratinae
- Genus: †Aulatornoceras; Schindewolf, 1922

Species
- See text

Extinct genus of molluscs

Aulatornoceras is a genus belonging to the subfamily Aulatornoceratinae, a member of the Goniatitida, an extinct order of shelled cephalopods included in the Ammonoidea. Aulatornoceras, which has been considered a subgenus of Tornoceras has ventro-lateral grooves. As with Tornoceras, the suture forms six lobes. The shell itself is involute.
