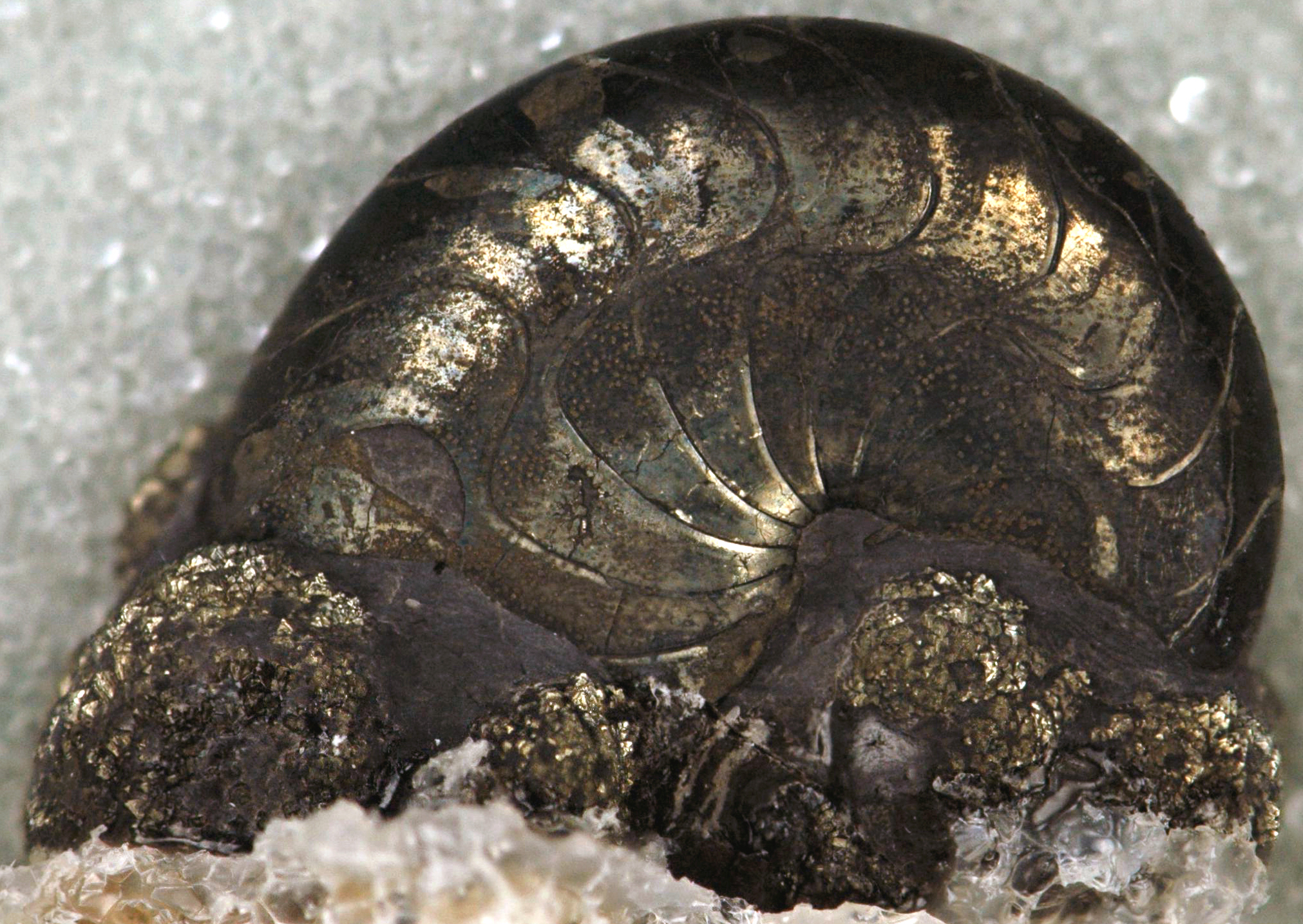

Scientific classification
- Domain: Eukaryota
- Kingdom: Animalia
- Phylum: Mollusca
- Class: Cephalopoda
- Subclass: †Ammonoidea
- Order: †Goniatitida
- Family: †Tornoceratidae
- Subfamily: †Tornoceratinae
- Genus: †Tornoceras; Hyatt, 1884

Species
- see text

= Tornoceras =

Tornoceras Temporal range: Middle Devonian - late Devonian

Extinct genus of molluscs

Tornoceras is a strongly involute, subdiscoidal Middle and Upper Devonian goniatite with a suture that forms six to ten lobes. Tornoceras is an extinct genus of cephalopods that shares similarities with the modern pearly nautilus. This genus first appeared during the Devonian Period, which spanned from 416 million to 359 million years ago. The shell is circular and relatively flat, with the final whorl enveloping the previous ones. The sutures between the successive chambers of the shell exhibit a gently rippled pattern.

Aulatornoceras, Protornoceras, Epitornoceras, Lobotornoceras are among related genera included in the Tornoceratidae. Inclusion however varies from classification to classification.
