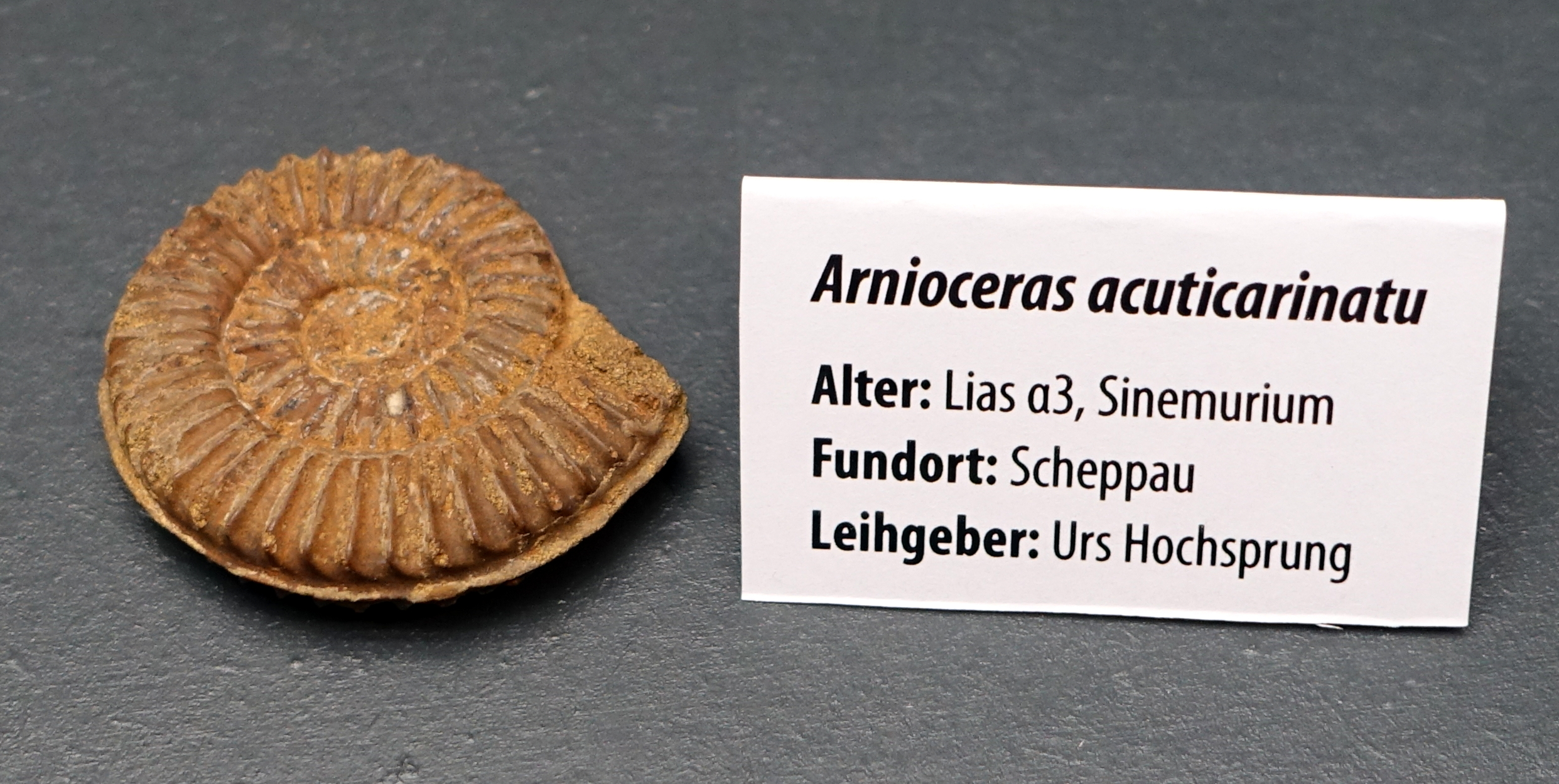
- Arnioceras acuticarinatu

Scientific classification
- Kingdom: Animalia
- Phylum: Mollusca
- Class: Cephalopoda
- Subclass: †Ammonoidea
- Order: †Ammonitida
- Family: †Arietitidae
- Genus: †Arnioceras; Hyatt, 1897

Species
- Arnioceras arnouldi Dumortier 1867; Arnioceras ceratitoides Quenstedt 1848; Arnioceras fieldingiceroides Dommergues and Faure 1986; Arnioceras insolitum Fucini 1902; Arnioceras miserabile Quendstedt 1858; Arnioceras nevadanum Gabb 1869; Arnioceras paucicostum Fucini 1901; Arnioceras rejectum Fucini 1902; Arnioceras robustum Quenstedt 1884; Arnioceras semicostatum Young and Bird 1828; Arnioceras speciosum Fucini 1902

Synonyms
- Arniotites; Burkhardticeras Lopez 1967; Eparnioceras Spath 1924; Laevispirus Venturi and Nannarone 2002; Melanhippites Crickmay 1928

= Arnioceras =

Arnioceras Temporal range: Sinemurian

Genus of molluscs (fossil)

Arnioceras is an extinct genus of large, evolute, discoidal ammonite from the Lower Jurassic. The shell is normally coiled so that all whorls are exposed. Sides bear strong sharp ribs that are straight until reaching the ventrolateral edge where they swing forward and fade. The rim (venter) is keeled and free of grooves.

Arnioceras, named by Alpheus Hyatt, is included in the arietitid family of the Psiloceratoidea, an ammonitid superfamily. Its distribution is fairly worldwide, having been found in Europe, south Asia, and North and South America.
