= Tornoceratidae =

Tornoceratidae Temporal range: middle and upper Devonian

Scientific classification
- Domain: Eukaryota
- Kingdom: Animalia
- Phylum: Mollusca
- Class: Cephalopoda
- Subclass: †Ammonoidea
- Order: †Goniatitida
- Superfamily: †Tornoceratoidea
- Family: †Tornoceratidae; Arthaber, 1911

Subfamilies
- Aulatornoceratinae; Falcitornoceratinae; Tornoceratinae

Extinct family of molluscs

Tornoceratidae is a family of goniatitid ammonoids from the middle and upper Devonian. The family is included in the suborder Tornoceratina and the superfamily Tornoceratoidea.

Tornoceratids are subdiscoidal goniatitids with biconvex growth lines and sutures that form 6 to 10 lobes, the ventral one undivided, the lateral ones originating as subdivisions of external and internal lateral saddle. They are derived from the Anarcestida.

== Taxonomy ==
Tornoceratidae as now understood is essentially the Tornoceratidae of Arthaber (1911) described in the American Treatise on Invertebrate Paleontology, Part L, revised to include three subfamilies, the Tornoceratinae, Aulatornoceratinae, and Falcitornoceratinae.

Miller et al. (1957) included the Tornoceratidae without subfamilies in the Cheilocerataceae, a superfaminily in the Goniatitida which also includes the Cheiloceratidae.

Tornoceratinae is based on the genus Tornoceras described by Alpheus Hyatt in 1884. Aulatornoceratinae and Falcitornoceratinae were established by Becker in 1993; Aulatornoceratinae based on Aulatornoceras, named by Schindewolf in 1922; Falcitornoceratinae on Falcitornoceras, named by House and Price in 1985.

The Tornoceratinae form the root stock of the tornoceratids and are derived from Anarcestida. Tornoceratinae in turn gave rise to Aulatornoceratinae and Falcitornoceratinae.

The Tornoceratinae includes Tornoceras, Epitornoceras, Lobotornoceras, Protornoceras, and Tornia, described in the Treatise (L 1957), along with Crassotornoceras, Linguatornoceras, Domanikoceras, Simcheiloceras, and Oxytornoceras which were added later.

Aulatornoceras, type for the Aulatornoceratinae was previously considered a subgenus of Tornoceras and is known from the Upper Devonian of North America and Europe. Aulatornoceras gave rise to Truyolsoceras and Polonoceras, which gave rise to Armatites, Kirsoceras, and Pernoceras, which gave rise to Pseudoclymenia making up the Aulotornoceratidae.

Genera making up the Falcitornoceratinae form an evolutionary series, Phoenixites, Falcitornoceras, Gundolficeras, Exotornoceras, leading up to Posttornoceras, type genus of the Posttornoceratidae.

== Descendants ==
The Tornoceratidae probably gave rise to the Cheiloceratidae (Miller et al. 1964, fig 12, L27) but though which genus is unspecified (Saunders et al. 2004). The Tornoceratidae may also have given rise, though Tornoceras to the Clymeniida.
