= Empson =

Empson is a surname. Notable people with the surname include:

- Derek Empson GBE KCB (1918–1997), Commander-in-Chief Naval Home Command
- Ernest Empson (1880–1970), New Zealand pianist and piano teacher
- Hetta Empson (1915–1996), South African sculptor
- Jackie Empson (born 1974), British former field hockey player
- Richard Empson (died 1510), minister of Henry VII, King of England
- Ruth Empson, New Zealand physiology academic
- Susan Empson, American mathematics education academic
- Tameka Empson (born 1977), British actress (stage and screen) and comedian
- Walter Empson (1856–1934), New Zealand educator
- William Empson (1906–1984), English literary critic and poet
- William Empson (lawyer) (1791–1852), barrister, professor and journalist
- Richard Empson, a minister to King Henry VII of England and Privy Counselor

== See also ==
- Empson River, river in the Canterbury Region of New Zealand
- Seven Types of Ambiguity (Empson), first published in 1930 by William Empson
