= Haffenden =

Haffenden is a surname. Notable people with the surname include:

- Elizabeth Haffenden (1906–1976), British costume designer
- John Haffenden (born 1945), English academic and writer
- Ray Haffenden, New Zealand rugby league player, coach, and administrator
