= Thomas Brooks (Puritan) =

English non-conformist Puritan preacher and author

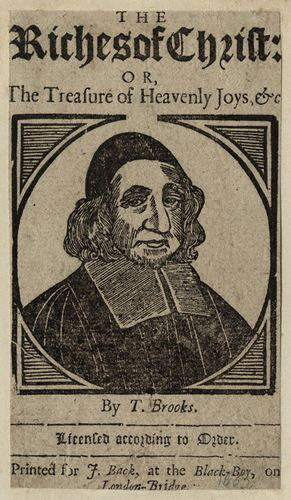
Thomas Brooks on the title page of his book The Riches of Christ.

Thomas Brooks (1608–1680) was an English non-conformist Puritan preacher and author.

== Life ==
Much of what is known about Thomas Brooks has been ascertained from his writings. Born in 1608, likely to wealthy parents, Brooks entered Emmanuel College, Cambridge in 1625, where he was preceded by such men as Thomas Hooker, John Cotton, and Thomas Shepard. He was licensed as a preacher of the gospel by 1640. Before that date, he appears to have spent several years at sea, probably as a chaplain with the fleet.

After the conclusion of the First English Civil War, Thomas Brooks became minister at Thomas Apostle's, London, and was sufficiently renowned for being chosen as preacher before the House of Commons on 26 December 1648. His sermon was afterward published under the title, 'God's Delight in the Progress of the Upright', the text being Psalm 44:18: 'Our heart is not turned back, neither have our steps declined from Thy way'. Three or four years afterward, he transferred to St. Margaret's, Fish-street Hill, London.

As a writer C. H. Spurgeon said of him, 'Brooks scatters stars with both hands, with an eagle eye of faith as well as the eagle eye of imagination'.

In 1662, he fell victim to the Act of Uniformity, but he appears to have remained in his parish and preached as the opportunity arose. Treatises continued to flow from his pen.

== Works ==
- Precious Remedies Against Satan's Devices, Banner of Truth Trust, Edinburgh (Puritan Paperbacks), first published 1652, ISBN 0-85151-002-7
- The Secret Key to Heaven: The Vital Importance of Private Prayer, Banner of Truth Trust, Edinburgh (Puritan Paperbacks), first published as 'The Privie Key of Heaven' 1665, ISBN 0-85151-924-5
- Heaven on Earth: A Treatise on Christian Assurance, Banner of Truth Trust (Puritan Paperbacks), first published 1654, ISBN 0-85151-356-5
- Anexichniastoi ploutoi tou Christou The unsearchable riches of Christ - 22 Sermons printed by Mary Simmons in 1655.
- A Mute Christian Under the Rod by Thomas Brooks, Old Paths Gospel Press, Choteau, MT USA
- The Works of Thomas Brooks, Banner of Truth Trust, ISBN 0-85151-302-6
- Smooth Stones taken from Ancient Brooks, by Thomas Brooks and C.H. Spurgeon, Banner of Truth Trust, ISBN 978-1-84871-113-6
