= William Empson =

English literary critic and poet

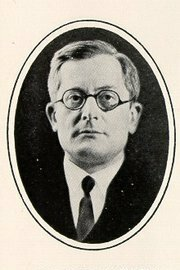
- Empson in the 1930s
- Born: 27 September 1906; Yokefleet Hall, Yorkshire, England
- Died: 15 April 1984 (aged 77); London, England
- Occupations: Literary critic and poet
- Notable work: Seven Types of Ambiguity (1930)
- Style: New Criticism
- Spouse: Hetta Empson

Sir William Empson (27 September 1906 – 15 April 1984) was an English literary critic and poet, widely influential for his practice of closely reading literary works, a practice fundamental to New Criticism. His best-known work is his first, Seven Types of Ambiguity, published in 1930.

Jonathan Bate has written that the three greatest English literary critics of the 18th, 19th and 20th centuries are Johnson, Hazlitt and Empson, "not least because they are the funniest".

== Background and education ==
Empson was the son of Arthur Reginald Empson of Yokefleet Hall, East Yorkshire. His mother was Laura, daughter of Richard Mickelthwait, JP, of Ardsley House, Yorkshire. He was a first cousin of the twins David and Richard Atcherley. Empson first discovered his great skill and interest in mathematics at his preparatory school. He won an entrance scholarship to Winchester College, where he excelled as a student and received what he later described as "a ripping education" in spite of the rather rough and abusive milieu of the school: a longstanding tradition of physical force, especially among the students, figured prominently in life at such schools.

In 1925 Empson won a scholarship to Magdalene College, Cambridge, where he read mathematics, gaining a first for his Part I but a disappointing upper-second for his Part II. He then went on to pursue a second degree in English, and at the end of the first year he was offered a Bye Fellowship. His supervisor in mathematics, Arthur Stanley Ramsey, expressed regret at Empson's decision to pursue English rather than mathematics, since it was a discipline for which Empson showed great talent.

I. A. Richards, the director of studies in English, recalled the genesis of Empson's first major work, Seven Types of Ambiguity, composed when Empson was not yet 22 and published when he was 24:

At about his third visit he brought up the games of interpretation which Laura Riding and Robert Graves had been playing [in A Survey of Modernist Poetry, 1927] with the unpunctuated form of 'The expense of spirit in a waste of shame.' Taking the sonnet as a conjuror takes his hat, he produced an endless swarm of lively rabbits from it and ended by 'You could do that with any poetry, couldn't you?' This was a Godsend to a Director of Studies, so I said, 'You'd better go off and do it, hadn't you?'

But disaster struck when a servant found condoms among Empson's possessions and claimed to have caught him in flagrante delicto with a woman. As a result, not only did he have his scholarship revoked, but his name was struck from the college records, he lost his prospects of a fellowship and he was banished from the university.

== Career ==
After his banishment from Cambridge, Empson supported himself for a brief period as a freelance critic and journalist, living in Bloomsbury until 1930, when he signed a three-year contract to teach in Japan after his tutor had failed to find him a post teaching in China. He returned to England in the mid-1930s only to depart again after receiving a three-year contract to teach at Peking University. Upon his arrival he discovered that, because of the Japanese invasion of China, he no longer had a post. He joined the exodus of the university's staff, with little more than a typewriter and a suitcase, and ended up in Kunming in China, with Lianda (Southwest Associated University), the school created there by students and professors who were refugees from the war in the North. He arrived back in England in January 1939. In 1941 he met and married the South African sculptor, broadcaster and journalist Hetta Crouse; they were to have two sons.

Empson worked for a year on the daily digest of foreign broadcasts and in 1941 met George Orwell, at that time the Indian editor of the BBC Eastern Service, on a six-week course at what was called the Liars' School of the BBC. They remained friends, but Empson recalled one clash: "At that time the Government had put into action a scheme for keeping up the birth-rate during the war by making it in various ways convenient to have babies, for mothers going out to work; government nurseries were available after the first month, I think, and there were extra eggs and other goodies on the rations. My wife and I took advantage of this plan to have two children. I was saying to George one evening after dinner what a pleasure it was to cooperate with so enlightened a plan when, to my horror, I saw the familiar look of settled loathing come over his face. Rich swine boasting over our privileges, that was what we had become ...".

Just after the war Empson returned to China. He taught at Peking University, befriending a young David Hawkes, who later became a noted sinologist and chair of Chinese at Oxford University. Then, in the late 1940s and early 1950s, he taught a summer course for the intensive study of literature at the Kenyon School of English at Kenyon College in Ohio. According to Newsweek, "The roster of instructors was enough to pop the eyes of any major in English." In addition to Empson the fellows included John Crowe Ransom, Robert Lowell, Delmore Schwartz, Eric Bentley, Cleanth Brooks, Arthur Mizener, Allen Tate and Yvor Winters.

In 1953 Empson was professor of rhetoric at Gresham College, London, for a year. He then became head of the English Department at the University of Sheffield until his retirement in 1972. In 1974 Empson accepted an offer of distinguished professorship at York University in Toronto. He was knighted in 1979, the same year his old college, Magdalen, awarded him an honorary fellowship some 50 years after his expulsion.

In 1964 Empson joined the Who Killed Kennedy? Committee set up by Bertrand Russell.

Professor Sir William Empson died in 1984.

== Critical focus ==
Empson's critical work is largely concerned with early and pre-modern works in the English literary canon. He was a significant scholar of Milton (see below), Shakespeare (Essays on Shakespeare) and Elizabethan drama (Essays on Renaissance Literature, Volume 2: The Drama). He published a monograph, Faustus and the Censor, on the subject of censorship and the authoritative version of Marlowe's Doctor Faustus. He was also an important scholar of the metaphysical poets John Donne (Essays on Renaissance Literature, Volume 1: Donne and the New Philosophy) and Andrew Marvell.

Occasionally Empson brought his critical genius to bear on modern writers; Using Biography, for instance, contains papers on Henry Fielding's Tom Jones as well as the poems of W. B. Yeats and T. S. Eliot, and Joyce's Ulysses.

== Literary criticism ==
Empson was styled a "critic of genius" by Frank Kermode, who qualified his praise by identifying wilfully perverse readings of certain authors. Harold Bloom has stated that Empson is among a handful of critics who matter most to him because of their force and eccentricity. Empson's bluntness led to controversy both during his life and after his death, and a reputation in part also as a "licensed buffoon" (Empson's own phrase).

=== Style, method and influence ===
Empson is today best known for his literary criticism, and in particular his analysis of the use of language in poetical works: his own poems are arguably undervalued, although they were admired by and influenced English poets in the 1950s. The philosopher Ludwig Wittgenstein was an acquaintance at Cambridge, but Empson consistently denied any previous or direct influence on his work. Empson's best-known work is the book Seven Types of Ambiguity, which, together with Some Versions of Pastoral and The Structure of Complex Words, mines the astonishing riches of linguistic ambiguity in English poetic literature. Empson's studies unearth layer upon layer of irony, suggestion and argumentation in various literary works, applying a technique of textual criticism so influential that often Empson's contributions to certain domains of literary scholarship remain significant, though they may no longer be recognised as his. The universal recognition of the difficulty and complexity (indeed, ambiguity) of Shakespeare's Sonnet 94 ("They that have power ..."), for instance, is traceable to Empson's analysis in Some Versions of Pastoral. Empson's study of "Sonnet 94" goes some way towards explaining the high esteem in which the sonnet is now held (often being reckoned as among the finest sonnets), as well as the technique of criticism and interpretation that has thus reckoned it.

Empson's technique of teasing a rich variety of interpretations from poetic literature does not, however, exhaustively characterise his critical practice. He was also very interested in the human or experiential reality to be discovered in great works of literature, as is manifest, for instance, in his discussion of the fortunes of the notion of proletarian literature in Some Versions of Pastoral. His commitment to unravelling or articulating the experiential truth or reality in literature permitted him unusual avenues to explore sociopolitical ideas in literature in a vein very different from contemporary Marxist critics or scholars of New Historicism. Thus, for instance, Empson remarks in the first few pages of Some Versions of Pastoral that:

Gray's Elegy is an odd case of poetry with latent political ideas:

Full many a gem of purest ray serene
The dark, unfathomed caves of ocean bear;
Full many a flower is born to blush unseen
And waste its sweetness on the desert air.

What this means, as the context makes clear, is that eighteenth century England had no scholarship system or carrière ouverte aux talents. This is stated as pathetic, but the reader is put into a mood in which one would not try to alter it. ... By comparing the social arrangement to Nature he makes it seem inevitable, which it was not, and gives it a dignity which was undeserved. ... The tone of melancholy claims that the poet understands the considerations opposed to aristocracy, though he judges against them; the truism of the reflections in the churchyard, the universality and impersonality this gives to the style, claim as if by comparison that we ought to accept the injustice of society as we do the inevitability of death.

Empson goes on to deliver his political verdict with a psychological suggestion:

Many people, without being communists, have been irritated by the complacence in the massive calm of the poem, and this seems partly because they feel there is a cheat in the implied politics; the "bourgeois" themselves do not like literature to have too much "bourgeois ideology".

Empson also made remarks reminiscent of Dr Samuel Johnson in their pained insistence:

And yet what is said is one of the permanent truths; it is only in degree that any improvement of society could prevent wastage of human powers; the waste even in a fortunate life, the isolation even of a life rich in intimacy, cannot but be felt deeply, and is the central feeling of tragedy. And anything of value must accept this because it must not prostitute itself; its strength is to be prepared to waste itself, if it does not get its opportunity. A statement of this is certainly non-political because it is true in any society, and yet nearly all the great poetic statements of it are in a way "bourgeois", like this one; they suggest to readers, though they do not say, that for the poor man things cannot be improved even in degree.

Despite the complexity of Empson's critical methods and attitude, his work, in particular Seven Types of Ambiguity, had a significant impact on the New Criticism, a school of criticism that directed particular attention to close reading of texts, among whose adherents may be numbered F. R. Leavis (whose critical approach was, however, already well developed before Empson appeared on the scene – he had been teaching at Cambridge since 1925), although Empson could scarcely be described as an adherent or exponent of such a school or, indeed, of any critical school at all. Indeed, Empson consistently ridiculed, both outrightly in words and implicitly in practice, the doctrine of the intentional fallacy formulated by William K. Wimsatt, an influential New Critic. Indeed, Empson's distaste for New Criticism could manifest itself in a distinctively dismissive and brusque wit, as when he described New Criticism (which he ironically labelled "the new rigour") as a "campaign to make poetry as dull as possible" (Essays on Renaissance Literature, Volume 1: Donne and the New Philosophy, p. 122). Similarly, both the title and the content of one of Empson's volumes of critical papers, Using Biography, show a patent and polemical disregard for the teachings of New Critics as much as for those of Roland Barthes and postmodern literary theories predicated upon, if not merely influenced by, the notion of the Death of the Author, despite the fact that some scholars regard Empson as a progenitor of certain of these currents of criticism, which vexed Empson. As Frank Kermode stated:

Now and again somebody like Christopher Norris may, in a pious moment, attempt to "recuperate" a particularly brilliant old-style reputation by claiming its owner as a New New Critic avant la lettre – Empson in this case, now to be thought of as having, in his "great theoretical summa," The Structure of Complex Words, anticipated deconstruction. The grumpy old man repudiated this notion with his habitual scorn, calling the work of Derrida (or, as he preferred to call him, "Nerrida") "very disgusting" (Kermode, Pleasure, Change, and the Canon)

=== Milton's God ===
Empson's Milton's God is often described as a sustained attack on Christianity and a defence of Milton's attempt to "justify the ways of God to man" in Paradise Lost. Empson argues that precisely the inconsistencies and complexities adduced by critics as evidence of the poem's badness in fact function in quite the opposite manner. What the poem brings out is the difficulty faced by anyone in encountering and submitting to the will of God and, indeed, the great clash between the authority of such a deity and the determinate desires and needs of human beings:

the poem is not good in spite of but especially because of its moral confusions, which ought to be clear in your mind when you are feeling its power. I think it horrible and wonderful; I regard it as like Aztec or Benin sculpture, or to come nearer home the novels of Kafka, and am rather suspicious of any critic who claims not to feel anything so obvious. (Milton's God (1965), p. 13)

Empson writes that it is precisely Milton's great sensitivity and faithfulness to the Scriptures, in spite of their apparent madness, that generates such a controversial picture of God. Empson reckons that it requires a mind of astonishing integrity to, in the words of Blake, be of the Devil's party without knowing it:

[Milton] is struggling to make his God appear less wicked, as he tells us he will at the start (l. 25), and does succeed in making him noticeably less wicked than the traditional Christian one; though, after all, owing to his loyalty to the sacred text and the penetration with which he make its story real to us, his modern critics still feel, in a puzzled way, that there is something badly wrong about it all. That this searching goes on in Paradise Lost, I submit, is the chief source of its fascination and poignancy... (Milton's God (1965), p. 11)

Empson portrays Paradise Lost as the product of a poet of astonishingly powerful and imaginative sensibilities and great intellect who had invested much of himself in the poem.

Despite its lack of influence, certain critics view Milton's God as by far the best sustained work of criticism on the poem by a 20th-century critic. Harold Bloom includes it as one of the few critical works worthy of canonical status in his The Western Canon (where it is also the only critical work concerned solely with a single piece of literature).

== Verse ==
Empson's poems are clever, learned, dry, aethereal and technically virtuosic, not wholly dissimilar to his critical work. His high regard for the metaphysical poet John Donne is to be seen in many places within his work, tempered with his appreciation of Buddhist thinking, an occasional tendency to satire and a larger awareness of intellectual trends. He wrote very few poems and stopped publishing poems almost entirely after 1940. His Complete Poems [edited by John Haffenden, his biographer] is 512 pages long, with over 300 pages of notes. In reviewing this work Frank Kermode commended Empson as a "most noteworthy poet" and chose it as International Book of the Year for The Times Literary Supplement.

== The Face of the Buddha ==
Empson's manuscript of a major work outside literary criticism, The Face of the Buddha, begun in 1931 on the basis of often gruelling research across many parts of the Buddhist world, was long thought to be lost, but a copy miraculously turned up among the papers of a former editor at Poetry London, Richard March, who had left them to the British Library in 2003. According to the publisher, Empson 'found himself captivated by the Buddhist sculptures of ancient Japan, and spent the years that followed in search of similar examples all over Korea, China, Cambodia, Burma, India, and Sri Lanka, as well as in the great museums of the West. Compiling the results of these wide-ranging travels into what he considered to be one of his most important works, Empson was heartbroken when he mislaid the sole copy of the manuscript in the wake of the Second World War. The Face of the Buddha remained one of the great lost books until its surprise rediscovery sixty years later [...] The book provides an engaging record of Empson's reactions to the cultures and artworks he encountered during his travels, and presents experimental theories about Buddhist art that many authorities of today have found to be remarkably prescient. It also casts important new light on Empson's other works, highlighting in particular the affinities of his thinking with that of the religious and philosophical traditions of Asia.'

== Bibliography ==
- Seven Types of Ambiguity (1930)
- The Face of the Buddha (1931, first published in 2016)
- Some Versions of Pastoral (1935)
- The Gathering Storm (1940)
- The Structure of Complex Words (1951)
- Collected Poems (1956, 1962, 1984)
- Milton's God (1961)
- Using Biography (1985)
- Essays on Shakespeare (1986)
- Faustus and the Censor (1987)
- Essays on Renaissance Literature: Volume 1, Donne and the New Philosophy (1993)
- Essays on Renaissance Literature: Volume 2, The Drama (1994)
- Argufying: Essays on Literature and Culture (1987)
- The Strengths of Shakespeare's Shrew: Essays, Memoirs and Interviews (1996)
- The Complete Poems of William Empson – ed. Haffenden
- The Royal Beasts and Other Works – London: Chatto & Windus (1986)
- Selected Letters of William Empson - ed. Haffenden, O.U.P. 2009

== Selected books about Empson ==
- Frank Day, Sir William Empson: An Annotated Bibliography, London: Garland, 1984. ISBN 0-8240-9207-4
- Philip and Averil Gardner, The God Approached: A Commentary on the Poems of William Empson, London: Chatto & Windus, 1978. ISBN 0-7011-2213-7
- John Haffenden, William Empson, Vol. 1: Among the Mandarins, Oxford University Press, 2005. ISBN 0-19-927659-5
- John Haffenden, William Empson, Vol. 2: Against the Christians, Oxford University Press, 2006. ISBN 0-19-953992-8
- Christopher Norris and Nigel Mapp, ed., William Empson: The Critical Achievement, Cambridge University Press, 1993. ISBN 0-521-35386-6
