= Joseph Caryl =

English ejected minister (1602–1673)

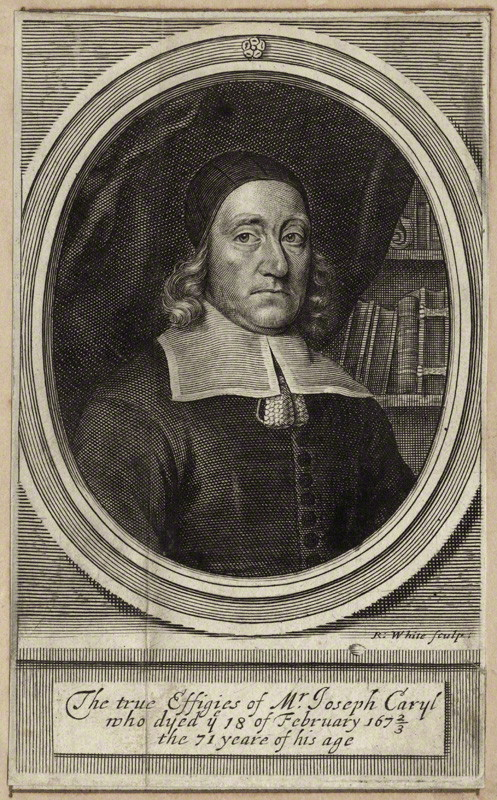
Joseph Caryl.

Joseph Caryl (November 1602 – 25 February 1673) was an English ejected minister.

== Life ==
He was born in London, educated at Merchant Taylors' School, and graduated at Exeter College, Oxford, and became preacher at Lincoln's Inn. He frequently preached before the Long Parliament. He was a member of the Westminster Assembly in 1643. By order of the parliament he attended Charles I in Holmby House, and in 1650 he was sent with John Owen to accompany Cromwell to Scotland.

In 1662, following the Restoration and the Act of Uniformity 1662, he was ejected from his church of St Magnus-the-Martyr near London Bridge. He continued, however, to minister to an Independent congregation in London until his death in March 1673, when John Owen succeeded him.

Caryl was buried in St. Michael Paternoster Royal Churchyard, London.

== Works ==
His piety and learning are displayed in his commentary on Job (12 vols., 1651–1666; 2nd edition, 2 vols., fol. 1676–1677). It was first published in parts from 1650 by Matthew and Mary Simmons. Their son, Samuel, committed himself to publish it as a single work and Mary transferred the rights to him in 1673. However it took several years to be ready and it was published in two volumes in 1676 and 1677.

His other publications include;

- A Directory for the Afflicted
- David’s Prayer for Solomon
- Joy Outlived
- The Nature and Principle of Love

C. H. Spurgeon commended Caryl’s work in his Commenting and Commentaries, noting that his work was “deeply devotional and spiritual”.

== Family ==
Joseph Caryl married, and his daughter Elizabeth married the merchant Benjamin Shute. Their child John Shute, the lawyer and theologian, was born at Theobalds, Essex; John changed his name, and became John Barrington, 1st Viscount Barrington.
