= Mary Simmons =

English printer

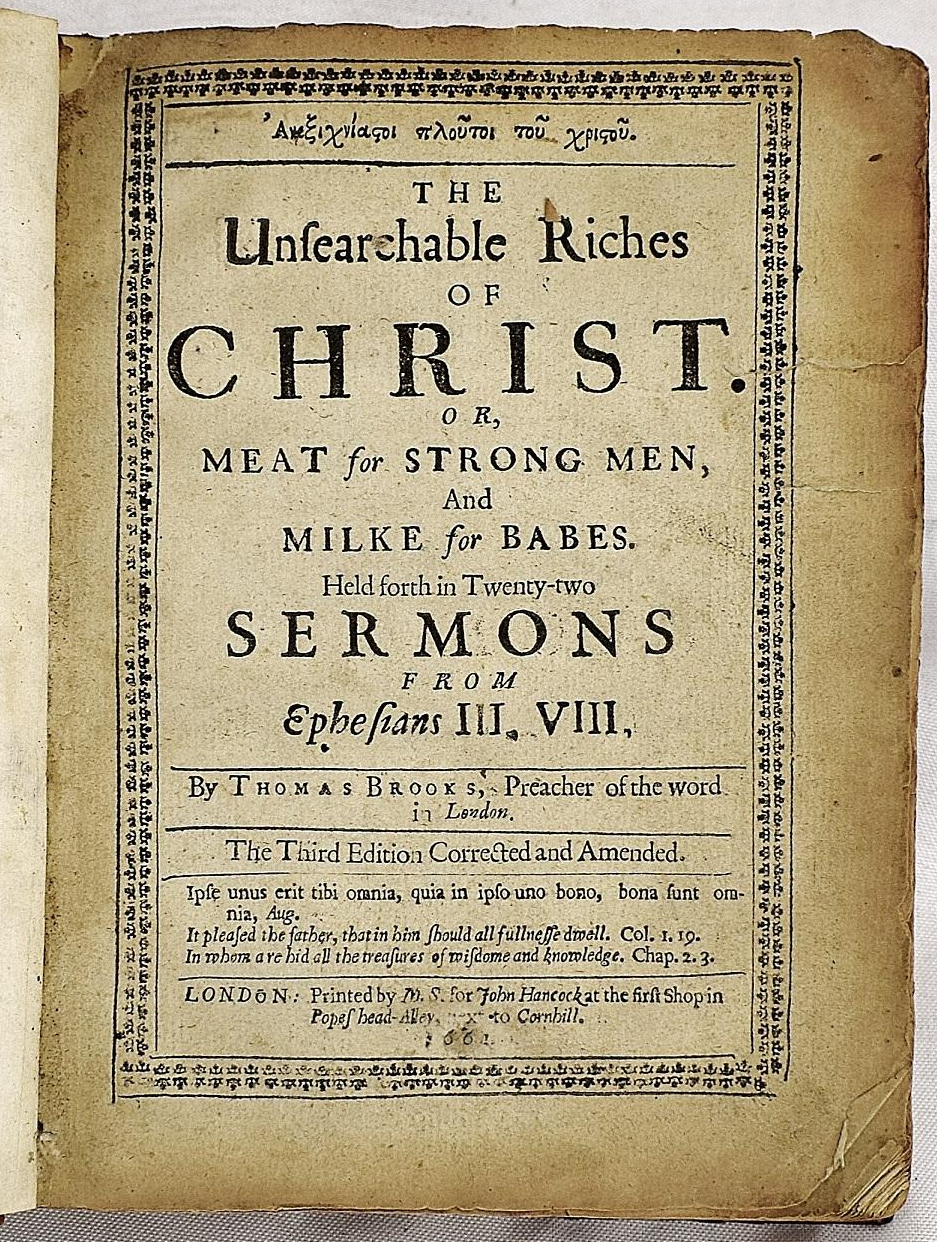
- Printed by MS (Mary Simmons)
- Died: c. 1687
- Occupations: Book printer, printer
- Spouse: Mathew Simmons

Mary Simmons (died c. 1687) was an English printer. She was a member of the Simmons family who published radical works in London in the 17th century. The business's most notable author was John Milton. Mary took over the printing business from her husband in 1654 and ran it. She worked in partnership with her son, Samuel Simmons, when he was older.

== Life ==
Her husband, Matthew, died on 19 May 1654. He was an English printer noted for publishing radical work including several works by John Milton including Doctrine and Discipline of Divorce in 1643. They had children together including Samuel Simmons Mary was the person named as the administer of his affairs.

Thomas Brooks's Anexichniastoi ploutoi tou Christou (The unsearchable riches of Christ) was printed by Mary Simmons in 1655 and her son Samuel was sent to the Merchant Taylors School until 1656. She and Samuel then ran the business together. However, it was Mary's name that appeared in the Stationers' Register and apprentices were contracted to her.

According to the 1666 hearth tax she ran the largest printing business in London. In 1668 she had five employees and an apprentice working two presses.

Samuel's name "S Simmons" appeared as the publisher mentioned in books from 1662 but it was not until 1667 that he appears in the publishers register for a book. In 1667 he notably added his name to his first book to the Stationers' register and that was Paradise Lost.

Joseph Caryl's commentary on Job (12 vols., 1651–1666; 2nd ed., 2 vols., fol. 1676–1677) was first published in parts from 1650 by her husband and from 1677 by Mary. Her son Samuel Simmons committed himself to publish it as a single work and Mary transferred the rights to him in 1673. However it took several years to be ready and it was published in two volumes in 1676 and 1677.

Mary went to live at a farm in Dagenham and she died sometime between Christmas 1686 and May 1687. Her son was her heir but he died very soon after her death.
