= Samuel Simmons (printer) =

English printer

Samuel Simmons (1640–1687) was an English printer, best known as the publisher of John Milton's Paradise Lost.

== Life ==
Simmons was born on 8 April 1640, but for some reason he was not baptised until 1643. His parents were Matthew and Mary Simmons. His father printed a number of Milton's works until he died in 1654. Mary Simmons ran the printing business and according to the hearth tax she ran the largest printing business in London.

Samuel was sent to the Merchant Taylors' School until 1656. He and his mother then ran the business together. His name appeared as the publisher in books from 1662 but it was not until 1667 that he appears in the publishers register for a book. In 1667 he notably added the name of his first book to the Stationers' register and that was Paradise Lost.
