= Ruth Empson =

New Zealand physiology academic

Ruth Mary Empson
- Education: University of London
- Scientific career
- Fields: Electrophysiology
- Workplaces: University of Otago
- Thesis: Primary and secondary epileptic foci from hippocampus and neocortex in the tetanus toxin model of chronic epilepsy. (1993)

Ruth Mary Empson is a New Zealand physiology academic, and as of 2019 is a full professor at the University of Otago.

== Academic career ==
After a 1993 PhD titled 'Primary and secondary epileptic foci from hippocampus and neocortex in the tetanus toxin model of chronic epilepsy' at the University of London, Empson moved to the University of Otago, rising to full professor.

== Selected works ==
- Macaskie, Lynne E., Ruth M. Empson, Anthony K. Cheetham, Clare P. Grey, and A. Jerome Skarnulis. "Uranium bioaccumulation by a Citrobacter sp. as a result of enzymically mediated growth of polycrystalline HUO2PO4." Science 257, no. 5071 (1992): 782–784.
- Jefferys, J. G., and RUTH M. Empson. "Development of chronic secondary epileptic foci following intrahippocampal injection of tetanus toxin in the rat." Experimental Physiology: Translation and Integration 75, no. 5 (1990): 733–736.
- Empson, Ruth Mary. "Mechanisms of Primary and Secondary Epileptic Foci from Hippocampus and Neocortex in the Tetanus Toxin Model of Chronic Epilepsy." PhD diss., Department of Physiology and Biophysics, St. Mary's Hospital Medical School, Imperial College, London, 1993.
- Clare, Alison Jane, Robert C. Day, Ruth Mary Empson, and Stephanie Margaret Hughes. "Transcriptome profiling of layer 5 intratelencephalic projection neurons from the mature mouse motor cortex." Frontiers in Molecular Neuroscience 11 (2018): 410.
- Empson, Ruth Mary. "Primary and Secondary Epileptic Foci from Hippocampus and Neocortex in the Tetanus Toxin Model of Chronic Epilepsy." PhD diss., University of London 1993., 1993.
