= John Haffenden =

British academic

John Haffenden FRSL FBA (born 19 August 1945) is emeritus professor of English literature at the University of Sheffield.

== Education and positions held ==
A graduate of Trinity College, Dublin (B.A., 1st class, in English language and literature: Richard F. Littledale Prize), he edited Icarus and completed his doctorate at St Peter's College, Oxford, under the supervision of Richard Ellmann. He spent two years as a lecturer in English and Liberal Studies at Oxford College of Further Education before teaching at the University of Exeter, 1973–74.

He joined the University of Sheffield staff in 1975, and was made a reader in 1988, and promoted to a personal chair in 1994. He served as a visiting lecturer at Peking University, Beijing, China in 1984 and as a guest lecturer at the 50th Anniversary Conference of "Xinan Lienda" (National Southwest Associated University), Kunming, China, 1988.

He held a British Academy research reader from 1989–91 and was a Leverhulme Research Fellow from 1995–96.

He has been a Fellow of the Yaddo Foundation, 1975; visiting fellow commoner, Trinity College, Cambridge, 1995–96; visiting scholar, St John's College, Oxford, 1997; visiting fellow, Magdalen College, Oxford 1998.

He is a member of the Society of Authors; a Fellow of the Royal Society of Literature; Fellow of the English Association; Fellow of the British Academy; Hon Member of the T.S.Eliot Society of America; Hon Foreign Member of the American Academy of Arts and Sciences.

Since 2009 he is senior research fellow of the Institute of English Studies, School of Advanced Study, University of London; principal investigator of the T.S.Eliot Editorial Research Project, funded by the Arts and Humanities Research Council, 2009–14; general editor of the Letters of T.S.Eliot.

== Publications ==
- Henry's Fate & Other Poems 1967–1972, by John Berryman: edited with an Introduction (New York: Farrar, Straus & Giroux, 1977; London: Faber & Faber, 1978)
- John Berryman: A Critical Commentary (London: Macmillan; New York: New York University Press, 1980)
- Viewpoints: Poets in Conversation (London: Faber & Faber, 1981)
- The Life of John Berryman (London and Boston: Routledge & Kegan Paul, 1982)
- W.H.Auden: The Critical Heritage (London and Boston: Routledge & Kegan Paul, 1982)
- Novelists in Interview (London and New York: Methuen, 1985)
- The Royal Beasts and Other Works, by William Empson; edited with an Introduction (London: Chatto & Windus, 1987; Iowa University Press, 1988)
- Argufying: Essays on Literature and Culture, by William Empson; edited with an Introduction (London: Chatto & Windus, 1987; Iowa University Press, 1988). Chosen by Sir Isaiah Berlin as one of the books of the year 1987 in the Sunday Times
- Essays on Renaissance Literature, Vol 1: "Donne and the New Philosophy, by William Empson; edited with an Introduction (Cambridge University Press, 1993)
- Essays on Renaissance Literature, Vol 2: The Drama, by William Empson; edited with an Introduction (Cambridge University Press, 1993)
- The Strengths of Shakespeare's Shrew: Essays, Memoirs and Interviews, by William Empson; edited with an Introduction (Sheffield: Sheffield Academic Press, 1996)
- Berryman's Shakespeare; edited with an Introduction (New York: Farrar, Straus & Giroux, 1999; London: Tauris, 2000)
- The Complete Poems of William Empson; edited with an Introduction (London: Allen Lane/Penguin Press, 2000; Tallahassee, Florida: University of Florida Press, 2000). Chosen by Sir Frank Kermode as one of the 'International Books of the Year', Times Literary Supplement, 1 December 2000; by David Sexton as 'Book of the Year', Evening Standard (London) December 2000
- William Empson: Among the Mandarins (Oxford: Oxford University Press, 2005). Winner of the American Publishers Association Award for Biography and Autobiography, 2005
- William Empson: Against the Christians (Oxford: Oxford University Press, 2006)
- Selected Letters of William Empson (Oxford: Oxford University Press, 2006)

General Editor:

- Letters of T.S. Eliot: Vol 1: 1898–1922 Revised edition. (Faber, 2009)
- Letters of T.S. Eliot: Vol 2: 1923–1925 (Faber, 2009)

Editor (with Valerie Eliot):

- Letters of T.S. Eliot: Vol 3: 1926–1927 (Faber, 2012)
- Letters of T.S. Eliot: Vol 4: 1929–1929 (Faber, 2013)
- Letters of T.S. Eliot: Vol 5: 1930–1931 (Faber, 2014)
- Letters of T.S. Eliot: Vol 6: 1932-1933 (Faber, 2016)
- Letters of T.S. Eliot: Vol 7: 1934-1935 (Faber, 2017)
