= Seven Types of Ambiguity =

Book by William Empson

- Title page for Seven Types of Ambiguity (1947)
- Author: William Empson
- Genre: Literary criticism
- Publication date: 1930

Seven Types of Ambiguity is a work of literary criticism by William Empson which was first published in 1930. It was one of the most influential critical works of the 20th century and was a key foundation work in the formation of the New Criticism school. The book is organized around seven types of ambiguity that Empson finds in the poetry he discusses. The second edition (revised) was published by Chatto & Windus, London, 1947, and there was another revised edition in 1953. The first printing in America was by New Directions in 1947.

Seven Types of Ambiguity ushered in New Criticism in the United States. The book is a guide to a style of literary criticism practiced by Empson. An ambiguity is represented as a puzzle to Empson. We have ambiguity when "alternative views might be taken without sheer misreading." Empson reads poetry as an exploration of conflicts within the author.

== Seven types ==
1. The first type of ambiguity is the metaphor, that is, when two things are said to be alike which have different properties. This concept is similar to that of metaphysical conceit.
2. Two or more meanings are resolved into one. Empson characterizes this as using two different metaphors at once.
3. Two ideas that are connected through context can be given in one word simultaneously.
4. Two or more meanings that do not agree but combine to make clear a complicated state of mind in the author.
5. When the "author is discovering his idea in the act of writing..." Empson describes a simile that lies halfway between two statements made by the author.
6. When a statement says nothing and the readers are forced to invent a statement of their own, most likely in conflict with that of the author.
7. Two words that within context are opposites that expose a fundamental division in the author's mind.
