= Empson River =

Coordinates: 42°34′S 172°38′E

Location
- Country: New Zealand

Physical characteristics
- Source
  - location: Hanmer Range
- Mouth
  - location: Waiau Uwha River

The Empson River is a stream in the Canterbury Region of New Zealand. It arises near Grey Hill in the Hanmer Range and flows south into the Waiau Uwha River. The name is not official.

== See also ==
- List of rivers of New Zealand
