= Christopher Norris (critic) =

British philosopher and literary critic (born 1947)

Christopher Charles Norris (born 6 November 1947) is a British philosopher and literary critic.

== Career ==
Norris completed his PhD in English at University College London in 1975. After an early career in literary and music criticism (during the late 1970s, he wrote for the now-defunct magazine Records and Recording), Norris moved in 1991 to the Cardiff Philosophy Department. In 1997, he was awarded the title of Distinguished Research Professor in the Cardiff School of English, Communication & Philosophy. He has also held fellowships and visiting appointments at a number of institutions, including the University of California, Berkeley, the City University of New York, Aarhus University, and Dartmouth College.

He is one of the world's leading scholars on deconstruction, and the work of Jacques Derrida. He has written numerous books and papers on literary theory, continental philosophy, philosophy of music, philosophy of language and philosophy of science. More recently, he has been focussing on the work of Alain Badiou in relation with both the analytic tradition (particularly analytic philosophy of mathematics) and with the philosophy of Derrida.

== Selected works ==
- Deconstruction: Theory and Practice. London; New York: Methuen, 1982
- Deconstructive Turn: Essays in the Rhetoric of Philosophy. New York: Routledge, 1983/2010
- Inside the Myth: Orwell, Views from the Left (Ed). London: Lawrence and Wishart, 1984
- The Contest of Faculties: Philosophy and Theory After Deconstruction. 1985
- Derrida (Fontana Modern Masters). Cambridge, Mass.: Harvard University Press, 1987
- Paul de Man: Deconstruction and the Critique of the Aesthetic Ideology. Routledge, 1988/2009
- What's Wrong with Postmodernism: Critical Theory and the Ends of Philosophy. Johns Hopkins University Press, 1990
- Spinoza and the Origins of Modern Critical Theory. Oxford: Basil Blackwell, 1991
- Uncritical Theory: Postmodernism, Intellectuals, and the Gulf War. Amherst: The University of Massachusetts Press, 1992
- Truth and the Ethics of Criticism. Manchester University Press, 1994.
- Resources of Realism: Truth, Meaning, and Interpretation. Palgrave, 1997
- Against Relativism: Philosophy of Science, Deconstruction, and Critical Theory. Oxford: Blackwell Publishers, 1997
- New Idols of the Cave: On the Limits of Anti-realism. Manchester University Press, 1997
- Quantum Theory and the Flight from Realism: Philosophical Responses to Quantum Mechanics. London; New York: Routledge, 2000
- Minding the Gap: Epistemology and Philosophy of Science in the Two Traditions. Amherst: University of Massachusetts Press, 2000
- Hilary Putnam: Realism, Reason, and the Uses of Uncertainty.. Manchester University Press, 2002
- Truth Matters: Realism, Anti-realism and Response-dependence. Edinburgh University Press, 2002
- Platonism, music and the listener's share. London: Continuum, 2006
- Badiou's Being and Event: A reader's guide. London; New York: Continuum, 2009
- Re-thinking the Cogito. Naturalism, Rationalism and the Venture of Thought. London; New York: Continuum, 2010
- Derrida, Badiou, and the Formal Imperative. Continuum, 2012
- Philosophy Outside-in: A Critique of Academic Reason. Edinburgh University Press, 2013

== See also ==
- List of thinkers influenced by deconstruction
