= Hetta Empson =

South African sculptor

- Born: Hester Henrietta (Hetta) Crouse; 18 September 1915; Kroonstad, South Africa
- Died: 22 December 1996 (aged 81)
- Known for: Sculpture
- Spouse: William Empson (from the 1940s until his death in 1984)

Hester Henrietta (Hetta) Crouse Empson (1915–1996) was a South African sculptor. She was described as a "sculptor, political activist, adventurer and socialite" in her obituary in the Times. She and her husband William Empson were involved in the London bohemian group that included George Orwell, Louis MacNeice, Jill Neville, Fay Weldon, Lewis Wolpert and Kathleen Raine.

== Life ==
Crouse was born in Kroonstad, South Africa on 18 September 1915. She attended Bloemfontein University and also studied art in Germany.

She returned to South Africa where she worked on a newspaper. Crouse returned to Europe with her then-fiancé Rene Graetz. After touring France and Switzerland, she went on, by herself to England. She stayed there throughout World War II, working as an ambulance driver and then at the British Broadcasting Corporation (BBC). At the BBC she met her future husband William Empson, the literary critic, with whom she had two sons.

The couple married and they moved to China in 1947. They stayed there until 1952, when they returned to England. William Empson moved to Sheffield to teach English at the University of Sheffield while Hetta Empson lived in London.

In 1956 she gave birth to her third son with her lover, the poet Peter Duval Smith.

In 1979 William Empson was knighted and Hetta became Lady Empson. She died on 22 December 1996.
