= Reference =

Relationship between objects

In logic, a reference is a relationship between objects in which one object designates, or acts as a means by which to connect to or link to, another object. The first object in this relation is said to refer to the second object. It is called a name for the second object. The next object, the one to which the first object refers, is called the referent of the first object. A name is usually a phrase or expression, or some other symbolic representation. Its referent may be anything – a material object, a person, an event, an activity, or an abstract concept.

References can take on many forms, including: a thought, a sensory perception that is audible (onomatopoeia), visual (text), olfactory, or tactile, emotional state, relationship with other, spacetime coordinates, symbolic or alpha-numeric, a physical object, or an energy projection. In some cases, methods are used that intentionally hide the reference from some observers, as in cryptography.

References feature in many spheres of human activity and knowledge, and the term adopts shades of meaning particular to the contexts in which it is used. Some of them are described in the sections below.

== Etymology and meanings ==
The word reference is derived from Middle English referren, from Middle French référer, from Latin referre, "to carry back", formed from the prefix re- and ferre, "to bear". A number of words derive from the same root, including refer, referee, referential, referent, referendum.

The verb refer (to) and its derivatives may carry the sense of "connect to" or "link to", as in the meanings of reference described in this article. Another sense is "consult"; this is reflected in such expressions as reference work, reference desk, job reference, etc.

== Semantics ==
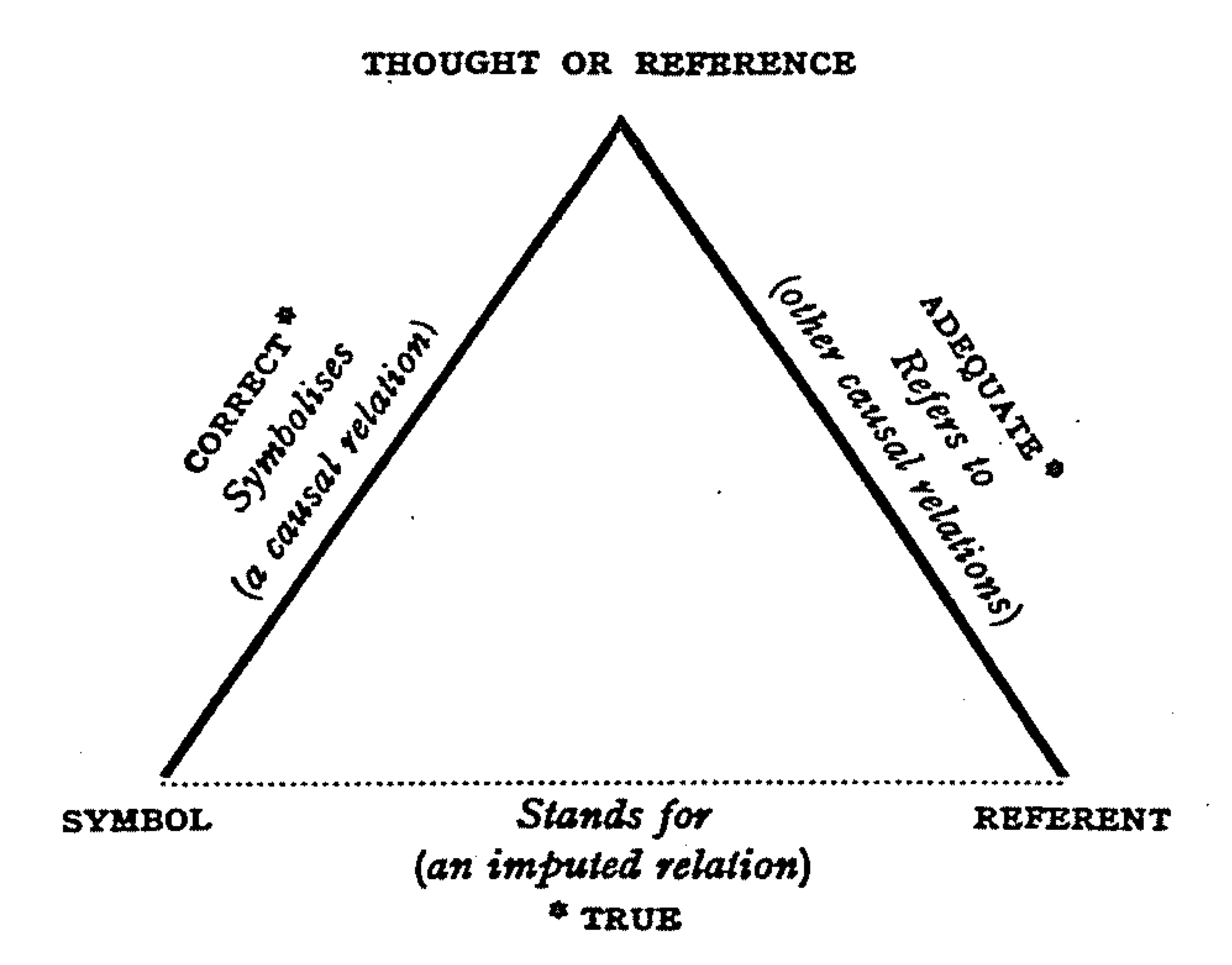
The triangle of reference, from the influential book The Meaning of Meaning (1923) by C. K. Ogden and I. A. Richards

In semantics, reference is generally construed as the relationships between nouns or pronouns and objects that are named by them. Hence, the word "John" refers to the person John. The word "it" refers to some previously specified object. The object referred to is called the referent of the word. Sometimes the word-object relation is called "denotation"; the word denotes the object. The converse relation, the relation from object to word, is called "exemplification"; the object exemplifies what the word denotes. In syntactic analysis, if a word refers to a previous word, the previous word is called the "antecedent".

=== Meaning ===
Gottlob Frege argued that reference cannot be treated as identical with meaning: "Hesperus" (an ancient Greek name for the evening star) and "Phosphorus" (an ancient Greek name for the morning star) both refer to Venus, but the astronomical fact that '"Hesperus" is "Phosphorus"' can still be informative, even if the "meanings" of "Hesperus" and "Phosphorus" are already known. This problem led Frege to distinguish between the sense and reference of a word.

=== Linguistic sign ===
The very concept of the linguistic sign is the combination of content and expression, the former of which may refer entities in the world or refer more abstract concepts, e.g. thought. Certain parts of speech exist only to express reference, namely anaphora such as pronouns. The subset of reflexives expresses co-reference of two participants in a sentence. These could be the agent (actor) and patient (acted on), as in "The man washed himself", the theme and recipient, as in "I showed Mary to herself", or various other possible combinations.

== Computer science ==
In computer science, references are data types that refer to an object elsewhere in memory and are used to construct a wide variety of data structures, such as linked lists. Generally, a reference is a value that enables a program to directly access the particular data item. Most programming languages support some form of reference. For the specific type of reference used in the C++ language, see reference (C++).

The notion of reference is also important in relational database theory; see referential integrity.

== Library and information sciences ==
References to many types of printed matter may come in an electronic or machine-readable form. For books, there exists the ISBN and for journal articles, the Digital object identifier (DOI) is gaining relevance. Information on the Internet may be referred to by a Uniform Resource Identifier (URI).

== Psychology ==
In terms of mental processing, a self-reference is used in psychology to establish identification with a mental state during self-analysis. This seeks to allow the individual to develop own frames of reference in a greater state of immediate awareness. However, it can also lead to circular reasoning, preventing evolution of thought.

According to Perceptual Control Theory (PCT), a reference condition is the state toward which a control system's output tends to alter a controlled quantity. The main proposition is that "All behavior is oriented all of the time around the control of certain quantities with respect to specific reference conditions."

== Scholarship ==
In academics and scholarship, a reference or bibliographical reference is a piece of information provided in a footnote or bibliography of a written work such as a book, article, essay, report, oration or any other text type, specifying the written work of another person used in the creation of that text. A bibliographical reference mostly includes the full name of the author, the title of their work and the year of publication. The primary purpose of references is to allow readers to examine the sources of a text, either for validity or to learn more about the subject. Such items are often listed at the end of a work in a section marked References or Bibliography.

References are particularly important as for the use of citations, since copying of material by another author without proper reference and / or without required permissions is considered plagiarism, and may be tantamount to copyright infringement, which can be subject to legal proceedings. A reference section contains only those works indeed cited in the main text of a work. In contrast, a bibliographical section often contains works not cited by the author, but used as background reading or listed as potentially useful to the reader.

Keeping a diary allows an individual to use references for personal organization, whether or not anyone else understands the systems of reference used. However, scholars have studied methods of reference because of their key role in communication and co-operation between different people, and also because of misunderstandings that can arise. Modern academic study of bibliographical references has been developing since the 19th century.

== Law ==
In patent law, a reference is a document that can be used to show the state of knowledge at a given time and that therefore may make a claimed invention obvious or anticipated. Examples of references are patents of any country, magazine articles, Ph.D. theses that are indexed and thus accessible to those interested in finding information about the subject matter, and to some extent Internet material that is similarly accessible.

== Arts ==
In art, a reference is an item from which a work is based. This may include:

- an existing artwork
- a reproduction (i.e., a photo)
- a directly observed object (e.g., a person)
- the artist's memory

Another example of reference is samples of various musical works being incorporated into a new one.

== See also ==
- Antecedent (grammar)
- Exemplification
- Generic antecedent
- Hyperlink
- Indexicality
- ISO 690
- Recommendation letter
- Semiotics, the study of signs which communicate meaning
- Signified and signifier
- Supposition theory, medieval European theories of reference
