= Referent =

Entity to which a name refers

A referent (/ˈrɛfərənt/ REF-ər-ənt) is an entity to which a name – a linguistic expression or other symbol – refers. For example, in the sentence "Mary saw me", the referent of the word "Mary" is the particular person called Mary who is being spoken of, while the referent of the word "me" is the person uttering the sentence.

Two expressions which have the same referent are said to be co-referential. In the sentence "John had his dog with him", for instance, the noun "John" and the pronoun "him" are co-referential, since they both refer to the same person (John).

== Etymology and meanings ==
The word referent may be diachronically considered to derive from the Latin referentem, the present participle (in accusative form) of the verb referre ("carry back", see also etymology of refer(ence)); or synchronically analyzable as the addition of the suffix -ent to the verb refer on the model of other English words having that suffix. It is defined in the Merriam-Webster Dictionary as "one that refers or is referred to; especially: the thing that a symbol (as a word or sign) stands for."

The earliest meaning of referent recorded in the Oxford English Dictionary is "one who is referred to or consulted", dating from 1844. A subsequent meaning is "a word referring to another"; the OED gives only one citation for this use, dating from 1899 (which speaks of "referent words or referents" that express a relation). The next meaning, which appears to stand in opposition to the previous meaning, as well as to the meaning implied by the etymology, is nonetheless the one which has gained currency: "that to which something [particularly a word or expression] has reference". This sense is first recorded in Ogden and Richards' The Meaning of Meaning (1923; see further below); the OED also lists numerous subsequent examples of that usage.

In logic, the word referent is sometimes used to denote one of the two objects participating in a relation, the other being called the relatum.

== In semantics and philosophy ==
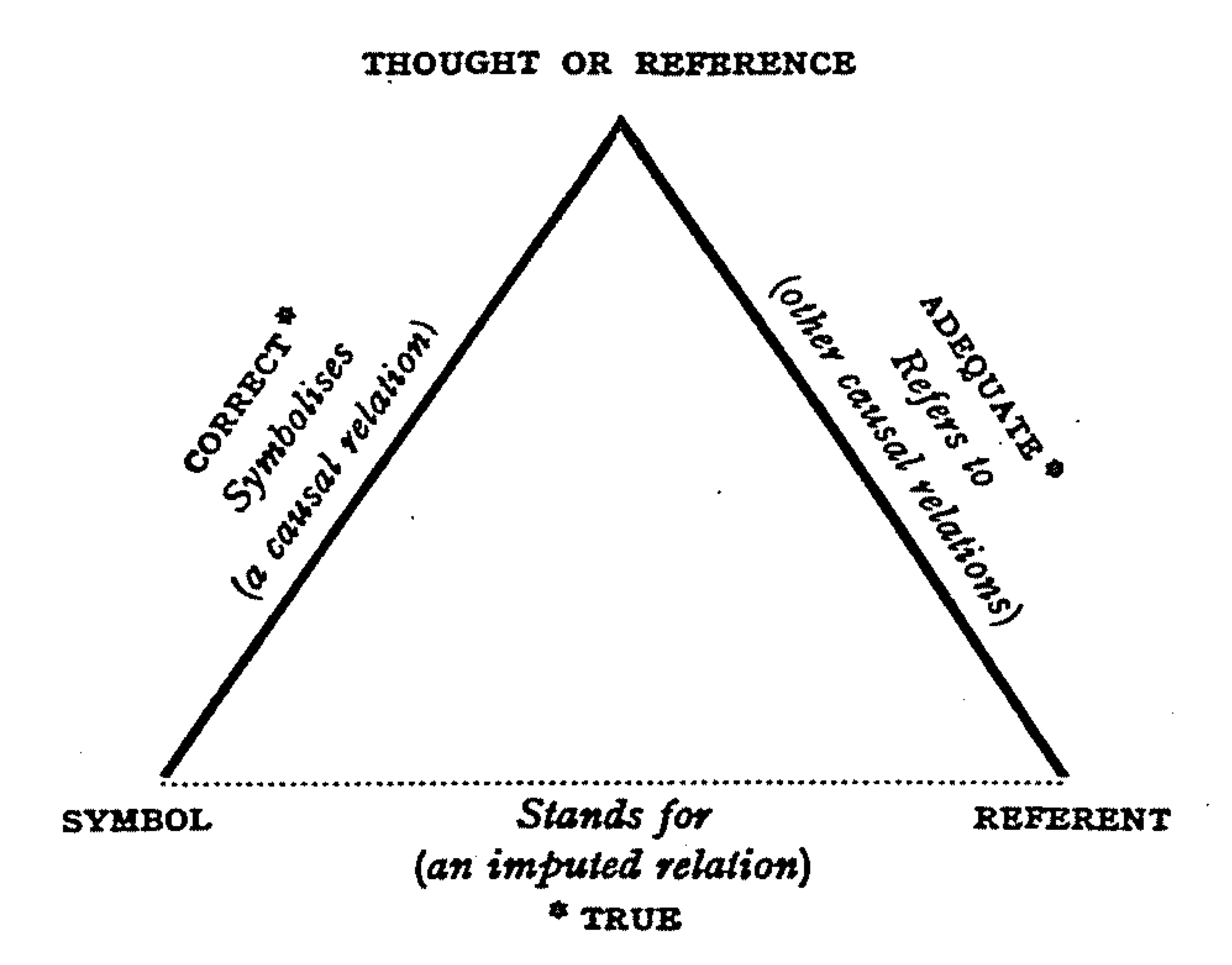
The triangle of reference, from Ogden and Richards' The Meaning of Meaning.

In fields such as semantics, semiotics, and the theory of reference, a distinction is made between a referent and a reference. Reference is a relationship in which a symbol or sign (a word, for example) signifies something; the referent is the thing signified. The referent may be an actual person or object, or may be something more abstract, such as a set of actions.

Reference and referents were considered at length in the 1923 book The Meaning of Meaning by the Cambridge scholars C. K. Ogden and I. A. Richards. Ogden has pointed out that reference is a psychological process, and that referents themselves may be psychological – existing in the imagination of the referrer, and not necessarily in the real world. For further ideas related to this observation, see failure to refer.

== In syntax ==
Considerations of the possible arrangement of expressions which may be co-referential – having the same referent – have been undertaken by linguists engaged in the study of syntax, particularly since Noam Chomsky advanced Government and Binding Theory (GBT) in the 1980s. The subject of binding is largely concerned with the possible syntactic positions of co-referential noun phrases and pronouns. Attempts are made to explain phenomena such as that illustrated by the following pair of sentences:

- Before she dried off, Mary was wet.
- She dried off because Mary was wet.

In the first sentence, she and Mary may have the same referent (she may refer to Mary), but in the second they normally cannot. More details of these considerations can be found in the articles on GBT and binding linked to above.

== In computing ==
Considerations of references and their referents are sometimes of importance in computing and programming. References play a role in the Perl programming language, for example, and the ref function is used to obtain the type of the referent of an object.

== See also ==
- Referring expression – Noun phrase, or surrogate, functioning to identify some individual object
- Origo (pragmatics) – Reference point of a deictic expression in the context of pragmatics
- Language game (philosophy) – Words and contextual actions which provide a complete meaning
- Private language argument – Argument that a language understandable by only one person is incoherent
