= Mental state =

State of mind

A mental state, or a mental property, is a state of mind of a person. Mental states comprise a diverse class, including perception, pain/pleasure experience, belief, desire, intention, emotion, and memory.

There is controversy concerning the exact definition of the term. According to epistemic approaches, the essential mark of mental states is that their subject has privileged epistemic access while others can only infer their existence from outward signs. Consciousness-based approaches hold that all mental states are either conscious themselves or stand in the right relation to conscious states. Intentionality-based approaches, on the other hand, see the power of minds to refer to objects and represent the world as the mark of the mental. According to functionalist approaches, mental states are defined in terms of their role in the causal network independent of their intrinsic properties. Some philosophers deny all the aforementioned approaches by holding that the term "mental" refers to a cluster of loosely related ideas without an underlying unifying feature shared by all.

Various overlapping classifications of mental states have been proposed. Important distinctions group mental phenomena together according to whether they are sensory, propositional, intentional, conscious or occurrent. Sensory states involve sense impressions such as visual perceptions or bodily pains. Propositional attitudes, such as beliefs and desires, are relations a subject has to a proposition. The characteristic of intentional states is that they refer to or are about objects or states of affairs. Conscious states are part of the phenomenal experience while occurrent states are causally efficacious within the owner's mind, with or without consciousness. An influential classification of mental states was created by Franz Brentano, who argued that there are only three basic kinds: presentations, judgments, and phenomena of love and hate.

Mental states are usually contrasted with physical or material aspects. For (non-eliminative) physicalists, they are a kind of high-level property that can be understood in terms of fine-grained neural activity. Property dualists, on the other hand, claim that no such reductive explanation is possible. Eliminativists may reject the existence of mental properties, or at least of those corresponding to folk psychological categories such as thought and memory. Mental states play an important role in various fields, including philosophy of mind, epistemology and cognitive science. In psychology, the term is used not just to refer to the individual mental states listed above but also to a more global assessment of a person's mental health.

== Definition ==
Various competing theories have been proposed about what the essential features of all mental states are, sometimes referred to as the search for the "mark of the mental". These theories can roughly be divided into epistemic approaches, consciousness-based approaches, intentionality-based approaches and functionalism. These approaches disagree not just on how mentality is to be defined but also on which states count as mental. Mental states encompass a diverse group of aspects of an entity, like this entity's beliefs, desires, intentions, or pain experiences. The different approaches often result in a satisfactory characterization of only some of them. This has prompted some philosophers to doubt that there is a unifying mark of the mental and instead see the term "mental" as referring to a cluster of loosely related ideas. Mental states are usually contrasted with physical or material aspects. This contrast is commonly based on the idea that certain features of mental phenomena are not present in the material universe as described by the natural sciences and may even be incompatible with it.

=== Epistemic and consciousness-based approaches ===
Epistemic approaches emphasize that the subject has privileged access to all or at least some of their mental states. It is sometimes claimed that this access is direct, private and infallible. Direct access refers to non-inferential knowledge. When someone is in pain, for example, they know directly that they are in pain, they do not need to infer it from other indicators like a body part being swollen or their tendency to scream when it is touched. But we arguably also have non-inferential knowledge of external objects, like trees or cats, through perception, which is why this criterion by itself is not sufficient. Another epistemic privilege often mentioned is that mental states are private in contrast to public external facts. For example, the fallen tree lying on a person's leg is directly open to perception by the bystanders while the victim's pain is private: only they know it directly while the bystanders have to infer it from their screams. It was traditionally often claimed that we have infallible knowledge of our own mental states, i.e. that we cannot be wrong about them when we have them. So when someone has an itching sensation, for example, they cannot be wrong about having this sensation. They can only be wrong about the non-mental causes, e.g. whether it is the consequence of bug bites or of a fungal infection. But various counterexamples have been presented to claims of infallibility, which is why this criterion is usually not accepted in contemporary philosophy. One problem for all epistemic approaches to the mark of the mental is that they focus mainly on conscious states but exclude unconscious states. A repressed desire, for example, is a mental state to which the subject lacks the forms of privileged epistemic access mentioned.

One way to respond to this worry is to ascribe a privileged status to conscious mental states. On such a consciousness-based approach, conscious mental states are non-derivative constituents of the mind while unconscious states somehow depend on their conscious counterparts for their existence. An influential example of this position is due to John Searle, who holds that unconscious mental states have to be accessible to consciousness to count as "mental" at all. They can be understood as dispositions to bring about conscious states. This position denies that the so-called "deep unconscious", i.e. mental contents inaccessible to consciousness, exists. Another problem for consciousness-based approaches, besides the issue of accounting for the unconscious mind, is to elucidate the nature of consciousness itself. Consciousness-based approaches are usually interested in phenomenal consciousness, i.e. in qualitative experience, rather than access consciousness, which refers to information being available for reasoning and guiding behavior. Conscious mental states are normally characterized as qualitative and subjective, i.e. that there is something it is like for a subject to be in these states. Opponents of consciousness-based approaches often point out that despite these attempts, it is still very unclear what the term "phenomenal consciousness" is supposed to mean. This is important because not much would be gained theoretically by defining one ill-understood term in terms of another. Another objection to this type of approach is to deny that the conscious mind has a privileged status in relation to the unconscious mind, for example, by insisting that the deep unconscious exists.

=== Intentionality-based approaches ===
Intentionality-based approaches see intentionality as the mark of the mental. The originator of this approach is Franz Brentano, who defined intentionality as the characteristic of mental states to refer to or be about objects. One central idea for this approach is that minds represent the world around them, which is not the case for regular physical objects. So a person who believes that there is ice cream in the fridge represents the world as being a certain way. The ice cream can be represented but it does not itself represent the world. This is why a mind is ascribed to the person but not to the ice cream, according to the intentional approach. One advantage of it in comparison to the epistemic approach is that it has no problems to account for unconscious mental states: they can be intentional just like conscious mental states and thereby qualify as constituents of the mind. But a problem for this approach is that there are also some non-mental entities that have intentionality, like maps or linguistic expressions. One response to this problem is to hold that the intentionality of non-mental entities is somehow derivative in relation to the intentionality of mental entities. For example, a map of Addis Ababa may be said to represent Addis Ababa not intrinsically but only extrinsically because people interpret it as a representation. Another difficulty is that not all mental states seem to be intentional. So while beliefs and desires are forms of representation, this seems not to be the case for pains and itches, which may indicate a problem without representing it. But some theorists have argued that even these apparent counterexamples should be considered intentional when properly understood.

=== Behaviorism and functionalism ===
Behaviorist definitions characterize mental states as dispositions to engage in certain publicly observable behavior as a reaction to particular external stimuli. On this view, to ascribe a belief to someone is to describe the tendency of this person to behave in certain ways. Such an ascription does not involve any claims about the internal states of this person, it only talks about behavioral tendencies. A strong motivation for such a position comes from empiricist considerations stressing the importance of observation and the lack thereof in the case of private internal mental states. This is sometimes combined with the thesis that we could not even learn how to use mental terms without reference to the behavior associated with them. One problem for behaviorism is that the same entity often behaves differently despite being in the same situation as before. This suggests that explanation needs to make reference to the internal states of the entity that mediate the link between stimulus and response. This problem is avoided by functionalist approaches, which define mental states through their causal roles but allow both external and internal events in their causal network. On this view, the definition of pain-state may include aspects such as being in a state that "tends to be caused by bodily injury, to produce the belief that something is wrong with the body and ... to cause wincing or moaning".

One important aspect of both behaviorist and functionalist approaches is that, according to them, the mind is multiply realizable. This means that it does not depend on the exact constitution of an entity for whether it has a mind or not. Instead, only its behavioral dispositions or its role in the causal network matter. The entity in question may be a human, an animal, a silicon-based alien or a robot. Functionalists sometimes draw an analogy to the software-hardware distinction where the mind is likened to a certain type of software that can be installed on different forms of hardware. Closely linked to this analogy is the thesis of computationalism, which defines the mind as an information processing system that is physically implemented by the neural activity of the brain.

One problem for all of these views is that they seem to be unable to account for the phenomenal consciousness of the mind emphasized by consciousness-based approaches. It may be true that pains are caused by bodily injuries and themselves produce certain beliefs and moaning behavior. But the causal profile of pain remains silent on the intrinsic unpleasantness of the painful experience itself. Some states that are not painful to the subject at all may even fit these characterizations.

=== Externalism ===
Theories under the umbrella of externalism emphasize the mind's dependency on the environment. According to this view, mental states and their contents are at least partially determined by external circumstances. For example, some forms of content externalism hold that it can depend on external circumstances whether a belief refers to one object or another. The extended mind thesis states that external circumstances not only affect the mind but are part of it. The closely related view of enactivism holds that mental processes involve an interaction between organism and environment.

== Classifications of mental states ==
There is a great variety of types of mental states, which can be classified according to various distinctions. These types include perception, belief, desire, intention, emotion and memory. Many of the proposed distinctions for these types have significant overlaps and some may even be identical. Sensory states involve sense impressions, which are absent in non-sensory states. Propositional attitudes are mental states that have propositional contents, in contrast to non-propositional states. Intentional states refer to or are about objects or states of affairs, a feature which non-intentional states lack. A mental state is conscious if it belongs to a phenomenal experience. Unconscious mental states are also part of the mind but they lack this phenomenal dimension. Occurrent mental states are active or causally efficacious within the owner's mind while non-occurrent or standing states exist somewhere in the back of one's mind but do not currently play an active role in any mental processes. Certain mental states are rationally evaluable: they are either rational or irrational depending on whether they obey the norms of rationality. But other states are arational: they are outside the domain of rationality. A well-known classification is due to Franz Brentano, who distinguishes three basic categories of mental states: presentations, judgments, and phenomena of love and hate.

=== Types of mental states ===
There is a great variety of types of mental states including perception, bodily awareness, thought, belief, desire, motivation, intention, deliberation, decision, pleasure, emotion, mood, imagination and memory. Some of these types are precisely contrasted with each other while other types may overlap. Perception involves the use of senses, like sight, touch, hearing, smell and taste, to acquire information about material objects and events in the external world. It contrasts with bodily awareness in this sense, which is about the internal ongoings in our body and which does not present its contents as independent objects. The objects given in perception, on the other hand, are directly (i.e. non-inferentially) presented as existing out there independently of the perceiver. Perception is usually considered to be reliable but our perceptual experiences may present false information at times and can thereby mislead us. The information received in perception is often further considered in thought, in which information is mentally represented and processed. Both perceptions and thoughts often result in the formation of new or the change of existing beliefs. Beliefs may amount to knowledge if they are justified and true. They are non-sensory cognitive propositional attitudes that have a mind-to-world direction of fit: they represent the world as being a certain way and aim at truth. They contrast with desires, which are conative propositional attitudes that have a world-to-mind direction of fit and aim to change the world by representing how it should be. Desires are closely related to agency: they motivate the agent and are thus involved in the formation of intentions. Intentions are plans to which the agent is committed and which may guide actions. Intention-formation is sometimes preceded by deliberation and decision, in which the advantages and disadvantages of different courses of action are considered before committing oneself to one course. It is commonly held that pleasure plays a central role in these considerations. "Pleasure" refers to experience that feels good, that involves the enjoyment of something. The topic of emotions is closely intertwined with that of agency and pleasure. Emotions are evaluative responses to external or internal stimuli that are associated with a feeling of pleasure or displeasure and motivate various behavioral reactions. Emotions are quite similar to moods, some differences being that moods tend to arise for longer durations at a time and that moods are usually not clearly triggered by or directed at a specific event or object. Imagination is even further removed from the actual world in that it represents things without aiming to show how they actually are. All the aforementioned states can leave traces in memory that make it possible to relive them at a later time in the form of episodic memory.

=== Sensation, propositional attitudes and intentionality ===
An important distinction among mental states is between sensory and non-sensory states. Sensory states involve some form of sense impressions like visual perceptions, auditory impressions or bodily pains. Non-sensory states, like thought, rational intuition or the feeling of familiarity, lack sensory contents. Sensory states are sometimes equated with qualitative states and contrasted with propositional attitude states. Qualitative states involve qualia, which constitute the subjective feeling of having the state in question or what it is like to be in it. Propositional attitudes, on the other hand, are relations a subject has to a proposition. They are usually expressed by verbs like believe, desire, fear or hope together with a that-clause. So believing that it will rain today, for example, is a propositional attitude. It has been argued that the contrast between qualitative states and propositional attitudes is misleading since there is some form of subjective feel to certain propositional states like understanding a sentence or suddenly thinking of something. This would suggest that there are also non-sensory qualitative states and some propositional attitudes may be among them. Another problem with this contrast is that some states are both sensory and propositional. This is the case for perception, for example, which involves sensory impressions that represent what the world is like. This representational aspect is usually understood as involving a propositional attitude.

Closely related to these distinctions is the concept of intentionality. Intentionality is usually defined as the characteristic of mental states to refer to or be about objects or states of affairs. The belief that the moon has a circumference of 10921 km, for example, is a mental state that is intentional in virtue of being about the moon and its circumference. It is sometimes held that all mental states are intentional, i.e. that intentionality is the "mark of the mental". This thesis is known as intentionalism. But this view has various opponents, who distinguish between intentional and non-intentional states. Putative examples of non-intentional states include various bodily experiences like pains and itches. Because of this association, it is sometimes held that all sensory states lack intentionality. But such a view ignores that certain sensory states, like perceptions, can be intentional at the same time. It is usually accepted that all propositional attitudes are intentional. But while the paradigmatic cases of intentionality are all propositional as well, there may be some intentional attitudes that are non-propositional. This could be the case when an intentional attitude is directed only at an object. In this view, Elsie's fear of snakes is a non-propositional intentional attitude while Joseph's fear that he will be bitten by snakes is a propositional intentional attitude.

=== Conscious and unconscious ===
A mental state is conscious if it belongs to phenomenal experience. The subject is aware of the conscious mental states it is in: there is some subjective feeling to having them. Unconscious mental states are also part of the mind but they lack this phenomenal dimension. So it is possible for a subject to be in an unconscious mental state, like a repressed desire, without knowing about it. It is usually held that some types of mental states, like sensations or pains, can only occur as conscious mental states. But there are also other types, like beliefs and desires, that can be both conscious and unconscious. For example, many people share the belief that the moon is closer to the earth than to the sun. When considered, this belief becomes conscious, but it is unconscious most of the time otherwise. The relation between conscious and unconscious states is a controversial topic. It is often held that conscious states are in some sense more basic with unconscious mental states depending on them. One such approach states that unconscious states have to be accessible to consciousness, that they are dispositions of the subject to enter their corresponding conscious counterparts. On this position there can be no "deep unconscious", i.e. unconscious mental states that can not become conscious.

The term "consciousness" is sometimes used not in the sense of phenomenal consciousness, as above, but in the sense of access consciousness. A mental state is conscious in this sense if the information it carries is available for reasoning and guiding behavior, even if it is not associated with any subjective feel characterizing the concurrent phenomenal experience. Being an access-conscious state is similar but not identical to being an occurrent mental state, the topic of the next section.

=== Occurrent and standing ===
A mental state is occurrent if it is active or causally efficacious within the owner's mind. Non-occurrent states are called standing or dispositional states. They exist somewhere in the back of one's mind but currently play no active role in any mental processes. This distinction is sometimes identified with the distinction between phenomenally conscious and unconscious mental states. It seems to be the case that the two distinctions overlap but do not fully match despite the fact that all conscious states are occurrent. This is the case because unconscious states may become causally active while remaining unconscious. A repressed desire may affect the agent's behavior while remaining unconscious, which would be an example of an unconscious occurring mental state. The distinction between occurrent and standing is especially relevant for beliefs and desires. At any moment, there seems to be a great number of things we believe or things we want that are not relevant to our current situation. These states remain inactive in the back of one's head even though one has them. For example, while Ann is engaged in her favorite computer game, she still believes that dogs have four legs and desires to get a pet dog on her next birthday. But these two states play no active role in her current state of mind. Another example comes from dreamless sleep when most or all of our mental states are standing states.

=== Rational, irrational and arational ===
Certain mental states, like beliefs and intentions, are rationally evaluable: they are either rational or irrational depending on whether they obey the norms of rationality. But other states, like urges, experiences of dizziness or hunger, are arational: they are outside the domain of rationality and can be neither rational nor irrational. An important distinction within rationality concerns the difference between theoretical and practical rationality. Theoretical rationality covers beliefs and their degrees while practical rationality focuses on desires, intentions and actions. Some theorists aim to provide a comprehensive account of all forms of rationality but it is more common to find separate treatments of specific forms of rationality that leave the relation to other forms of rationality open.

There are various competing definitions of what constitutes rationality but no universally accepted answer. Some accounts focus on the relation between mental states for determining whether a given state is rational. In one view, a state is rational if it is well-grounded in another state that acts as its source of justification. For example, Scarlet's belief that it is raining in Manchester is rational because it is grounded in her perceptual experience of the rain while the same belief would be irrational for Frank since he lacks such a perceptual ground. A different version of such an approach holds that rationality is given in virtue of the coherence among the different mental states of a subject. This involves an holistic outlook that is less concerned with the rationality of individual mental states and more with the rationality of the person as a whole. Other accounts focus not on the relation between two or several mental states but on responding correctly to external reasons. Reasons are usually understood as facts that count in favor or against something. On this account, Scarlet's aforementioned belief is rational because it responds correctly to the external fact that it is raining, which constitutes a reason for holding this belief.

=== Classification according to Brentano ===
An influential classification of mental states is due to Franz Brentano. He argues that there are three basic kinds: presentations, judgments, and phenomena of love and hate. All mental states either belong to one of these kinds or are constituted by combinations of them. These different types differ not in content or what is presented but in mode or how it is presented. The most basic kind is presentation, which is involved in every mental state. Pure presentations, as in imagination, just show their object without any additional information about the veridical or evaluative aspects of their object. A judgment, on the other hand, is an attitude directed at a presentation that asserts that its presentation is either true or false, as is the case in regular perception. Phenomena of love and hate involve an evaluative attitude towards their presentation: they show how things ought to be, and the presented object is seen as either good or bad. This happens, for example, in desires. More complex types can be built up through combinations of these basic types. To be disappointed about an event, for example, can be construed as a judgment that this event happened together with a negative evaluation of it. Brentano's distinction between judgments, phenomena of love and hate, and presentations is closely related to the more recent idea of direction of fit between mental state and world, i.e. mind-to-world direction of fit for judgments, the world-to-mind direction of fit for phenomena of love and hate and null direction of fit for mere presentations. Brentano's tripartite system of classification has been modified in various ways by Brentano's students. Alexius Meinong, for example, divides the category of phenomena of love and hate into two distinct categories: feelings and desires. Uriah Kriegel is a contemporary defender of Brentano's approach to the classification of mental phenomena.

== Academia ==
Discussions about mental states can be found in many areas of study.

In cognitive psychology and the philosophy of mind, a mental state is a kind of hypothetical state that corresponds to thinking and feeling, and consists of a conglomeration of mental representations and propositional attitudes. Several theories in philosophy and psychology try to determine the relationship between the agent's mental state and a proposition.

Instead of looking into what a mental state is, in itself, clinical psychology and psychiatry determine a person's mental health through a mental status examination.

== Epistemology ==
Mental states also include attitudes towards propositions, of which there are at least two—factive and non-factive, both of which entail the mental state of acquaintance. To be acquainted with a proposition is to understand its meaning and be able to entertain it. The proposition can be true or false, and acquaintance requires no specific attitude towards that truth or falsity. Factive attitudes include those mental states that are attached to the truth of the proposition—i.e. the proposition entails truth. Some factive mental states include "perceiving that", "remembering that", "regretting that", and (more controversially) "knowing that". Non-factive attitudes do not entail the truth of the propositions to which they are attached. That is, one can be in one of these mental states and the proposition can be false. An example of a non-factive attitude is believing—people can believe a false proposition and people can believe a true proposition. Since there is the possibility of both, such mental states do not entail truth, and therefore, are not factive. However, belief does entail an attitude of assent toward the presumed truth of the proposition (whether or not it is so), making it and other non-factive attitudes different from a mere acquaintance.

== See also ==
- Altered state of consciousness, a mental state that is different from the normal state of consciousness
- Flow (psychology), the mental state of operation in which a person in an activity is fully immersed in a feeling of energized focus
- Mental factors (Buddhism), aspects of the mind that apprehend the quality of an object, and that have the ability to color the mind
- Mental representation, a hypothetical internal cognitive symbol
- Mood (psychology), an emotional state
- Propositional attitude, a relational mental state connecting a person to a proposition
- Benj Hellie's Vertiginous question

== Sources ==
- Rowlands, Mark; Lau, Joe; Deutsch, Max (2020). "Externalism About the Mind". The Stanford Encyclopedia of Philosophy. Metaphysics Research Lab, Stanford University.
- Smith, Basil. "Internalism and Externalism in the Philosophy of Mind and Language". Internet Encyclopedia of Philosophy.
- Greif, Hajo (November 2017). "What is the extension of the extended mind?". Synthese. 194 (11): 4311–4336. doi:10.1007/s11229-015-0799-9. PMC 5686289. PMID 29200511.
- Rowlands, Mark (March 2009). "Enactivism and the Extended Mind". Topoi. 28 (1): 53–62. doi:10.1007/s11245-008-9046-z.
