= The Meaning of Meaning =

1923 book by C. K. Ogden and I. A. Richards

- Cover for the eighth edition, published in 1946.
- Author: C. K. Ogden and I. A. Richards
- Language: en
- Publisher: Kegan Paul, Trench, Trübner & Co
- Publication date: 1923
- Publication place: United Kingdom
- OCLC: 1430032
- Dewey Decimal: 401.9
- LC Class: 23009064

The Meaning of Meaning: A Study of the Influence of Language upon Thought and of the Science of Symbolism (1923) is a book by C. K. Ogden and I. A. Richards. It is accompanied by two supplementary essays by Bronisław Malinowski and F. G. Crookshank. The conception of the book arose during a two-hour conversation between Ogden and Richards held on a staircase in a house next to the Cavendish Laboratories at 11 pm on Armistice Day, 1918.

== Overview ==
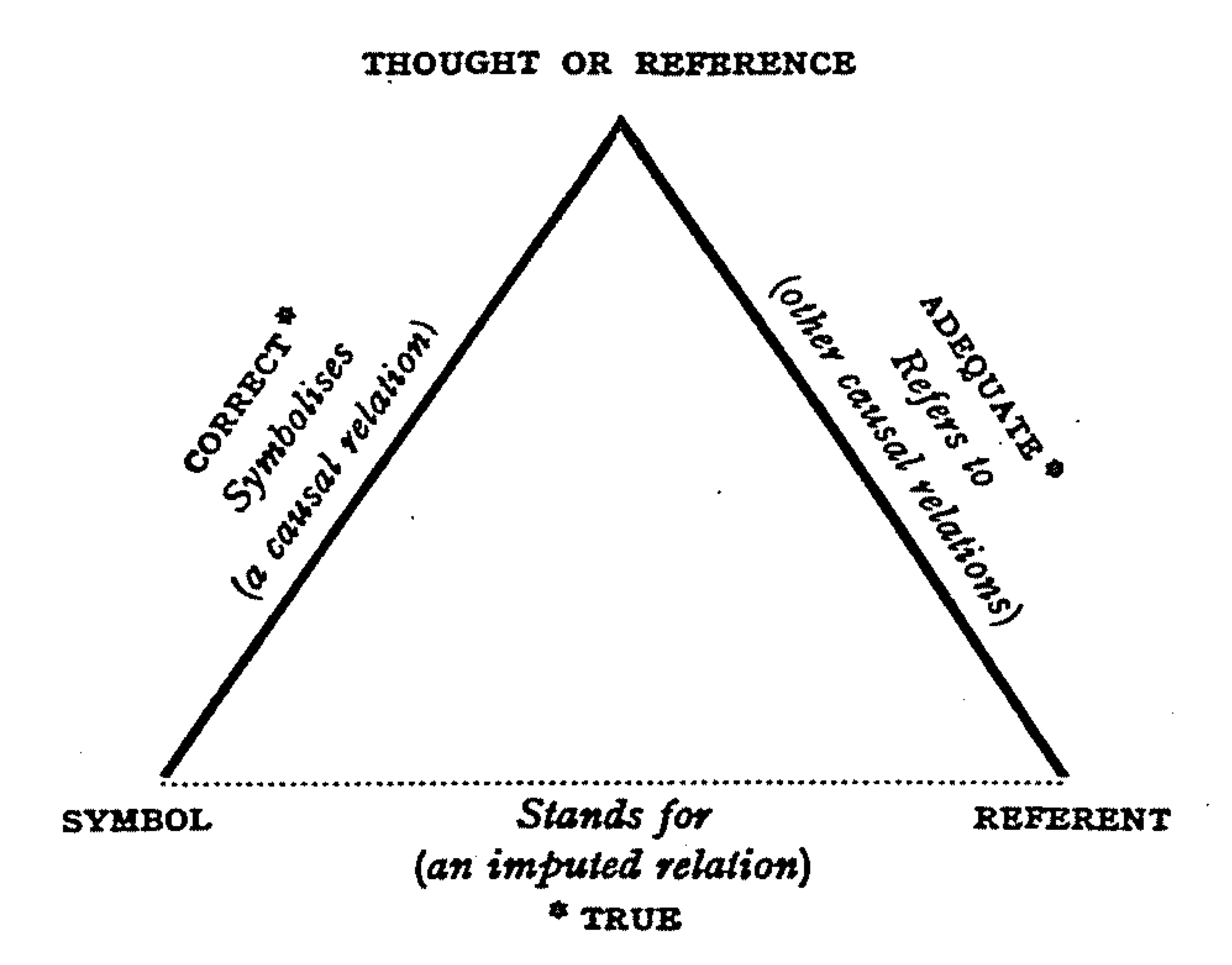
The triangle of reference, or semiotic triangle. Figure taken from page 11 of The Meaning of Meaning.

The Meaning of Meaning was first published in 1923 and has been used as a textbook in many fields including linguistics, philosophy, language, cognitive science and most recently semantics and semiotics in general. The book has rarely been out of print — Winston Churchill's interest in Basic English ensured that it was reprinted even at the height of wartime paper-rationing. A critical edition prepared by W. Terrence Gordon was published in 1994 as part of the five-volume set C. K. Ogden and Linguistics (London: Routledge/Thoemmes Press, 1994). It follows the first edition of 1923, recording all earlier and later variants. A reading edition prepared by John Constable appeared in 2001 as part of the ten-volume I. A. Richards: Selected Works, 1919-1938 (London and New York: Routledge, 2001). It is "a correct and modernized text of the last revised edition produced by the authors". Constable's version, subsequently released in paperback and ebook formats, has become the standard trade edition. The full publication history up to 1990, including serialised publication in The Cambridge Magazine prior to the first edition of the book, is in W. Terrence Gordon's, C. K. Ogden: A Bio-bibliographical Study.

Richards sets forth a contextual theory of Signs: that Words and Things are connected “through their occurrence together with things, their linkage with them in a ‘context’ that Symbols come to play that important part in our life [even] the source of all our power over the external world” (47). In this context system, Richards develops a tri-part semiotics—symbol, thought and referent with three relations between them (thought to symbol=correct, thought–referent=adequate, symbol–reference=true) (11). Symbols are “those signs which men use to communicate one with another and as instruments of thought, occupy a peculiar place” (23). “All discursive symbolization involves […] weaving together of contexts into higher contexts” (220). So for a word to be understood “requires that it form a context with further experiences” (210).

The book later influenced A. J. Ayer's Language, Truth, and Logic, an introduction to logical positivism, and both the Richards–Ogden book and the Ayer book in turn influenced Alec King and Martin Ketley in the writing of their book The Control of Language, which appeared in 1939, and which influenced C. S. Lewis in the writing of his defence of natural law and objective values, The Abolition of Man (1943).

== See also ==
- Charles Sanders Peirce
- Embodied cognition
- General semantics
- Gostak
- Hilary Putnam
- Pragmatics
- Psycholinguistics
- Semiotics
