= Latitudinarianism (philosophy) =

In philosophy, latitudinarianism is a position concerning de dicto and de re (propositional) attitudes. Latitudinarians think that de re attitudes are not a category distinct from de dicto attitudes; the former are just a special case of the latter.

The term was introduced into discussions of de dicto and de re attitudes by Roderick Chisholm in his "Knowledge and Belief: 'De Dicto' and 'De Re'" (1976). Latitudinarianism has since also sometimes been called an "unrestricted exportation" view.

== References and further reading ==
- Baker, Lynne Rudder (1982). "De Re Belief in Action" The Philosophical Review, Vol. 91, No. 3, pp. 363–387.
- Chisholm, Roderick (1976). "Knowledge and Belief: 'De Dicto' and 'De Re'" Philosophical Studies 29, pp. 1-20.
- Quine, W. V. O. (1956). "Quantifiers and Propositional Attitudes" Journal of Philosophy 53. Reprinted in Quine's Ways of Paradox (1976), pp. 185–196.
- Sosa, Ernest (1995). "Fregean Reference Defended" Philosophical Issues, Vol. 6, Content, pp. 91–99.
