= Mongolian idiocy =

Obsolete medical term for Down syndrome

The obsolete medical terms "Mongolian idiocy" and "Mongolism" referred to a specific type of mental deficiency, associated with the genetic disorder now known as Down syndrome. The obsolete term for a person with this syndrome was "Mongolian idiot".

In the 21st century, those terms are no longer used as medical terminology; they are deemed unacceptable, offensive and a slur towards those with Down syndrome. The terminology change was brought about both by scientific and medical experts, as well as people of Asian ancestry, including those from Mongolia.

== History ==
John Langdon Down first characterized what is now known as Down syndrome as a distinguishable form of mental disability in 1862, and in a more widely published report in 1866. Due to his perception that these children shared facial similarities with the populations that German physician Johann Friedrich Blumenbach described as the "Mongolian race", Down used the term "mongoloid" in his characterisation of these patients.

The term continued its usage into the 20th century. A study published in 1908 by W. Bertram Hill was titled Mongolism and its Pathology. The term "Mongolism" was used by English psychiatrist and geneticist Lionel Penrose as late as 1961.

F. G. Crookshank published a pseudoscientific book in 1924 titled The Mongol in Our Midst which suggested that the syndrome was due to genetic traits literally inherited from Mongoloid races.

Rock band Devo released a song titled "Mongoloid" in 1977, describing a man with Down syndrome.

A few languages retained the colloquialism "Mongol" to mean "idiot". Racing driver Max Verstappen called Lance Stroll a "Mongol" after a collision in practice ahead of the 2020 Portuguese Grand Prix.

== Deprecation of the term ==
In 1961, genetic experts wrote a joint letter to the medical journal The Lancet which read:

It has long been recognized that the terms Mongolian Idiocy, Mongolism, Mongoloid, etc. as applied to a specific type of mental deficiency have misleading connotations. The importance of this anomaly among Europeans and their descendants is not related to the segregation of genes derived from Asians; its appearance among members of Asian populations suggests such ambiguous designations as 'Mongol Mongoloid'; increasing participation of Chinese and Japanese in investigation of the condition imposes on them the use of an embarrassing term. We urge, therefore, that the expressions which imply a racial aspect of the condition be no longer used. Some of the undersigned are inclined to replace the term Mongolism by such designations as 'Langdon Down Anomaly', or 'Down's Syndrome or Anomaly', or 'Congenital Acromicria'. Several of us believe that this is an appropriate time to introduce the term 'Trisomy 21 Anomaly', which would include cases of simple Trisomy as well as translocations. It is hoped that agreement on a specific phrase will soon crystallize once the term 'Mongolism' has been abandoned.

In 1965, WHO resolved to abandon the term at the request of the Mongolian People's Republic. The term thereafter began to fade from use, in favor of Down's syndrome, Down syndrome and Trisomy 21 disorder.

The term "Mongolian idiocy" was reported as continuing in use at least 15 years after the WHO's decision to abandon it; in his book The Panda's Thumb, published in 1980, paleontologist Stephen Jay Gould reported that the term "Mongolism" was still commonly used in the United States, despite being "defamatory" and "wrong on all counts".

The term received renewed attention in 2026 after an official White House account used the term "mongoloid moron" to refer to reporter Andrew Feinberg. Trump spokesman Steven Cheung had used the exact same slur to refer to Feinberg earlier in the year. In response, the executive director of the National Down Syndrome Congress issued a statement condemning the use of the term without specifically naming Trump or Cheung.

== See also ==
- Idiot#Disability and early classification and nomenclature
