= Triangle of reference =

Model in semiotics

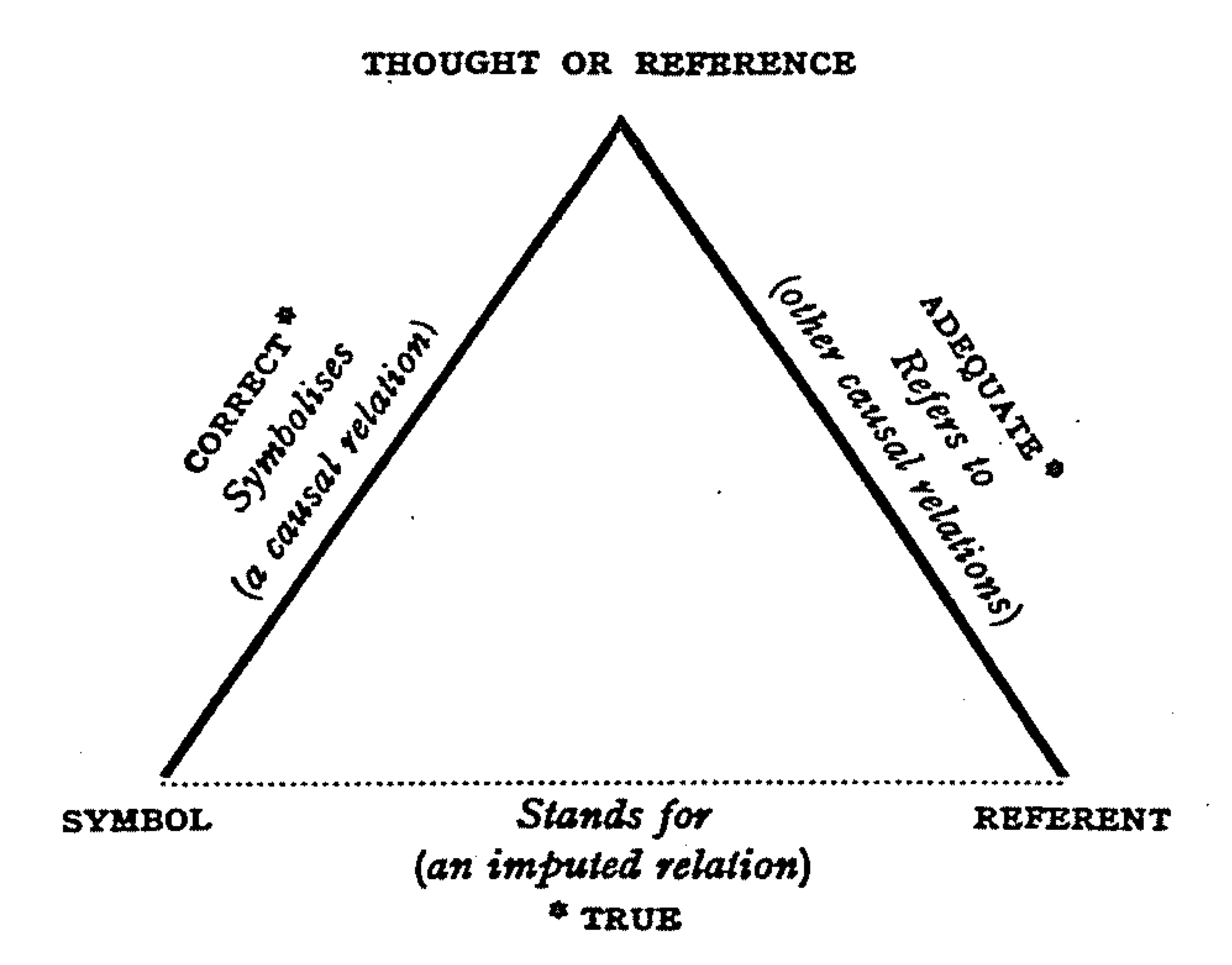
The triangle of reference, or semiotic triangle. Figure taken from page 11 of The Meaning of Meaning.

The triangle of reference (also known as the triangle of meaning and the semiotic triangle) is a model of how linguistic symbols relate to the objects they represent. The triangle was published in The Meaning of Meaning (1923) by Charles Kay Ogden and I. A. Richards.

The triangle describes a simplified form of relationship between the speaker (the subject), a concept (an object or referent), and its designation (sign, signans). The Triangle relates to the problem of universals, a philosophical debate which split ancient and medieval philosophers, especially realists and nominalists.

While often referred to as the "Ogden/Richards triangle", the idea was also expressed in 1810 by Bernard Bolzano, in his Beiträge zu einer begründeteren Darstellung der Mathematik (Contributions to a more well-founded presentation of mathematics). The triangle can be traced back to 4th century BC, in Aristotle's Peri Hermeneias.

== See also ==
- Direction of fit
- The Delta Factor
- De dicto and de re
- De se
