= Origo (pragmatics) =

Reference point of a deictic expression in the context of pragmatics

In pragmatics, the origo is the reference point on which deictic relationships are based.

In most deictic systems, the origo identifies with the current speaker (or some property thereof). For instance, if the speaker, John, were to say "This is now my fish", then John would be the origo, and the deictic word "my" would be dependent on that fact. Likewise, his use of the word "this" and "now" communicate his properties, namely his location and point in time.

The word origo comes from Latin origo, which means "origin" (pl. origines). Origo is also the origin of the English word "origin".

This word also occurs in the term phrase fons et origo, meaning "source and origin" (fons, "source", et, "and", origo, "origin").

== See also ==
- Referent
