= De se =

Latin philosophical phrase

De se is Latin for "of oneself" and, in philosophy, it is a phrase used to delineate what some consider a category of ascription distinct from "de dicto and de re". Such ascriptions are found with propositional attitudes, mental states an agent holds toward a proposition. Such de se ascriptions occur when an agent holds a mental state towards a proposition about themselves, knowing that this proposition is about themselves.

== Overview ==
A sentence such as: "Peter thinks that he is pale," where the pronoun "he" is meant to refer to Peter, is ambiguous in a way not captured by the de dicto / de re distinction. Such a sentence could report that Peter has the following thought: "I am pale". Or Peter could have the following thought: "he is pale", where it so happens that the pronoun "he" refers to Peter, but Peter is unaware of it. The first meaning expresses a belief de se, while the second does not.

This notion is extensively discussed in the philosophical literature, as well as in the theoretical linguistic literature, the latter because some linguistic phenomena clearly are sensitive to this notion.

David Lewis's 1979 article "Attitudes De Dicto and De Se" gave full birth to the topic, and his expression of it draws heavily on his distinctive theory of possible worlds.

But modern discussions on this topic originate with Hector-Neri Castañeda's discovery of what he called quasi-indexicals (or "quasi-indicators"): according to Castañeda, the speaker of the sentence "Mary believes that she herself is the winner" uses the quasi-indicator "she herself" (often written "she∗") to express Mary's first-person reference to herself (i.e., to Mary). That sentence would be the speaker's way of depicting the proposition that Mary would unambiguously express in the first person by "I am the winner".

A clearer case can be illustrated simply. Imagine the following scenario:

Peter, who is running for office, is drunk. He is watching an interview of a candidate on TV, not realizing that this candidate is himself. Liking what he hears, he says: "I hope this candidate gets elected." Having witnessed this, one can truthfully report Peter's hopes by uttering: "Peter hopes that he will get elected", where "he" refers to Peter, since "this candidate" indeed refers to Peter. However, one could not report Peter's hopes by saying: "Peter hopes to get elected". This last sentence is only appropriate if Peter had a de se hope—that is, a hope in the first person as if he had said "I hope I get elected"—which is not the case here.

The study of the notion of belief de se thus includes that of quasi-indexicals, the linguistic theory of logophoricity and logophoric pronouns, and the linguistic and literary theory of free indirect speech.
