= The Mongol in Our Midst =

Pseudo-scientific book published in 1924

- Author: Francis Graham Crookshank
- Language: English
- Publication date: 1924
- Publication place: United Kingdom

The Mongol in Our Midst: A Study of Man and His Three Faces is the title of the pseudo-scientific book written by British physician Francis Graham Crookshank and published in 1924.

The book, characteristic of the consequently discredited ideas of scientific racism prevalent at the time, explored and presented the idea that "Mongolian imbecility" (a form of intellectual disability now called Down's syndrome and known to be caused by the replication (trisomy) of the chromosome 21) was an atavistic throwback to, and/or the result of, rape committed by members of the supposedly more primitive "Mongoloid races" (such as the Huns, Avars or the Mongols themselves) in the wake of their various invasions of Europe throughout history. The book also claimed that "Mongolian imbecility" was partly the result of Ashkenazi Jews having interbred with the steppe tribe of the Khazars.

== Contents ==
In The Mongol in Our Midst, Crookshank argued that "Mongolian imbecility", thought at the time to affect only Caucasian people, was the result of the distant racial history of a person with the disorder. Crookshank argued that both parents of a person with "Mongolian imbecility" either carried genetic traits inherited from a commonly shared "Mongoloid" ancestor, or that all Caucasians shared a distant "Mongoloid" ancestry.

As a result, "Mongolian imbecility" constituted an atavistic genetic throwback, wherein the supposed ancestral genetic traits of the individual reappeared, having been "lost" throughout generations of ancestors and evolutionary change. Crookshank believed the re-emergence of these genetic traits was due to the individual in question's incomplete development in the womb. Crookshank deemed "Mongolian imbeciles" to be a "race apart" from Caucasian people, describing that "For better or for worse, they are not quite as are other men and women around them", and describing English patients with the condition as "Mongol expatriates".

In support of his theory, Crookshank relied on a set of physical traits and behaviors he dubbed the "Mongolian stigmata", among which he included small earlobes, protruding anuses, and small genitals in both sexes, all of which he claimed to be common among both "Mongolian imbeciles" and members of what he termed the "Mongoloid race", which included Chinese and Japanese people, as well as those from Mongolia. Crookshank also cited the cross legged sitting posture of both some "Mongolian imbeciles" and some depictions of the Buddha in statues as further supporting evidence for his theory.

Despite Crookshank's widely popular depiction of those with the condition, his description of Down's Syndrome as linked with the Mongolian people was not the first in medical literature, with Scottish scientist Robert Chambers credited with the first recorded link between the race and the condition in his 1844 work Vestiges of the Natural History of Creation. John Langdon Down, whose name is used for the condition today, coined the term "imbecile of the Mongoloid type" in 1856, labelling those with the condition the "Mongolian type of Idiot" as part of Down's wider theory that it was possible to classify different types of conditions by supposed ethnic characteristics. Despite his comparison, Down stressed the fact that the parents of the patients he described were of Caucasian heritage, and that his patients, therefore, were not "real Mongols".

However, in reference to this, Crookshank argued at length that Down's patients, for their perceived similarities to Mongolian people, were, therefore, "real Mongols" as Down had argued against. Where Down presented his observation that white parents could have offspring who bore a superficial resemblance to other races as evidence of "the unity of the human species", Crookshank argued the reverse, allying himself with the views of his German translator, Eugen Kurtz, to claim that the different human races were, in fact, different species, themselves descended from different species of apes.

== Reception ==
The Mongol in Our Midst successfully reached a broad audience and experienced considerable popularity. A contemporary review of the book's third edition in the Journal of the American Medical Association states that the first edition "attracted wide attention when it first became available", with an entry in The British Journal of Psychiatry in 1931 remarking that The Mongol in Our Midst "excited considerable excitement on its first appearance".

However, the book also received some critical approbation at the time; one contemporary review in the journal Nature praised Crookshank as "argu[ing] with much skill in favour of his view" on atavism, but was more dubious of his promotion of polygenism, noting that it had "not found favour among anthropologists generally" and that "this part of his theory has been most strongly criticised". One contemporary reviewer remarked whether "this theory was ever seriously entertained by anyone other than the author himself", with other contemporaries of Crookshank viewing his arguments as "preposterous" and "flimsy in the extreme." A review of the first edition in The Nation wondered briefly whether the whole book was simply a hoax, as "The author's thesis need only be stated to be refuted with a laugh".

== Publication and editions ==
The book experienced popularity in the 1920s and 1930s; despite some criticism from medical contemporaries of Crookshank, the book was expanded from its 123 page first edition in 1924 to over 500 pages by its third edition in 1931, with Crookshank publishing his fully rewritten and much expanded subsequent editions in open response and rebuttal to his critics, with the third edition including responses by Crookshank to critics, as well as expanding the book's anthropological and clinical material, including its various speculations and arguments.

== Subsequent development of medical theory ==
Modern medical scholars regard Crookshank's work as one devoid of true scientific substance, and instead as a product of racial thought of the time, constituting "a grand edifice of absurd allegations about the orangutan, the racial 'Mongolian,' the "Mongoloid,' all of whom were said to share a variety of homologies."

Crookshank's theories were refuted entirely by the discoveries in 1959 of trisomy 21, the genetic defect causing Down's Syndrome, although the term "Mongolism", despite Crookshank's contributions to its stigmatization, took several decades to fade away entirely.

== See also ==
- Mongolian idiocy
- Recapitulation theory
