= Direction of fit =

Concept in the philosophy of language

The term "direction of fit" is used in the philosophy of intentionality to distinguish between types of representations. It is commonly applied in two related senses: first, to distinguish the mental states of belief and desire; and second, to distinguish between types of linguistic utterances, such as indicative and imperative sentences.

First, philosophers of mind distinguish between mind-to-world (i.e., mind-to-fit-world) and world-to-mind (i.e., world-to-fit-mind) directions of fit. In the former, mental states such as beliefs are subject to updates in order to fit evidence provided by the world (the mind changes to fit the world, thus beliefs have a mind-to-world direction of fit). In the latter, mental states such as desires motivate the agent to change the world in order to fit the desired state in the mind (the world changes to fit the mind, thus desires have a world-to-mind direction of fit).

Similarly, philosophers of language, in particular advocates of speech act theory such as John Searle, distinguish between word-to-world and world-to-word directions of fit. In the former, utterances such as indicative sentences attempt to describe the world; for a statement, the state of affairs is considered appropriate if the content expressed by the words fit the way the world really is (a word-to-world direction of fit). In the latter, utterances such as imperative sentences attempt to cause a change in the world; for an order, the state of affairs is considered appropriate when the world changes to fit the words (a world-to-word direction of fit).

In both cases, the issue is how representations are considered satisfactory. Beliefs and descriptive statements are considered satisfactory when the states of affairs they represent match the world; i.e. when they are true. Desires and orders are considered satisfactory when world matches the state of affairs they represent; i.e. when they are fulfilled.

== Overview ==
In philosophy of mind, a belief has a mind-to-world direction of fit. A belief (that p, say) depicts the world as being in a state of affairs such that p is true. Beliefs, some philosophers have argued, aim at the truth and so aim to fit the world. A belief is satisfied when it fits the world.

A desire, on the other hand, normally expresses a yet to be realized state of affairs and so has a world-to-mind direction of fit. A desire that p, unlike a belief, doesn't depict the world as being in the state that p; rather it expresses a desire that the world be such that p is true. Desire is a state that is satisfied when the world fits it.

A way to account for the difference is that a (rational) person that holds the belief that p when confronted with evidence that not-p, will revise his belief, whereas a person that desires that p can retain his desire that p in the face of evidence that not-p.

To a philosopher of language a word-to-world fit occurs when, say, a sports journalist correctly names Jones as a goal scorer; while if the journalist mistakenly names Smith as the goal scorer, the printed account does not display a word-to-world fit, and must be altered such that it matches the real world. Conversely, a world-to-word fit occurs when a fan of Smith's team opines that they deserved to win the match, even though they lost. In this case, the world would have to change to make the sports fan's wish become true.

However, in the case of, say, a judge delivering a death sentence to a criminal declared guilty by a jury, the utterances of the judge alter the world, through the fact of that utterance; and, in this case, the judge is generating a world-to-word-to-world fit (see below). So, if the judge's opinion is upheld, the world must be altered to match the content of the judge's utterance (i.e., the criminal must be executed).

== In medieval philosophy ==
According to Thomas Aquinas (Summa Theologica, Part I, Question 21, Article 2), there are two kinds of "truth" (veritas), both understood as correspondence between mind (intellectus) or words (oratio) and world ("things", res):

Truth consists in the equation of [thing and mind] (adaequatio rei et intellectus), as said above. Now the mind, that is the cause of the thing, is related to it as its rule and measure; whereas the converse is the case with the mind that receives its knowledge from things.

When, therefore, things are the measure and rule of the mind, truth consists in the equation of the mind to the thing, as happens in ourselves. For according as a thing is, or is not, our thoughts or our words about it are true or false.

But when the mind is the rule or measure of things, truth consists in the equation of the thing to the mind; just as the work of an artist is said to be true, when it is in accordance with his art. Now as works of art are related to art, so are works of justice related to the law with which they accord. Therefore, God's justice, which establishes things in the order conformable to the rule of His wisdom, which is the law of His justice, is suitably called truth. Thus, we also in human affairs speak of the truth of justice. (emphasis added to original)

== In philosophy of language ==
Perhaps the first to speak of a "direction of fit" was the philosopher J. L. Austin. Austin did not use the distinction between different directions of fit to contrast commands or expressions of intention to assertions, or desires to beliefs. He rather distinguishes different ways of asserting that an item is of a certain type.

In a detailed analysis of the distinctions between various scenarios, such as (a) mislabeling a triangle as a square (which Austin regarded as an act of linguistic violence) and (b) inaccurately describing a triangular object as a square (which Austin considered an act of factual violence), Austin introduced a conceptual differentiation. He labeled these distinctions as follows:

- "the onus of match": in the case of one wanting to match X and Y, the distinction between the matching of X to Y and the matching of Y to X; and
- "the direction of fit": in the case of naming something, the difference between the fitting of a name to an item, and the fitting of an item to a name.

The concept of direction of fit can also apply to speech acts: e.g., statements, guesses and conjectures have word-to-world direction of fit, while commands and promises have a world-to-word direction of fit.

John Searle and Daniel Vanderveken assert that there are only four possible "directions of fit" in language:

1. The word-to-world direction of fit.
In achieving success of fit the propositional content of the utterance fits an independently existing state of affairs in the world. E.g.: "We are married".

2. The world-to-word direction of fit.
To achieve success of fit the world must change to match the propositional content of the utterance. E.g.: "Will you marry me?", "I want to marry him", "You'd just better marry her, buddy!", etc.

3. The double direction of fit.
To achieve success of fit the world is thereby altered to fit the propositional content by representing the world as being so altered, unlike sense 2. E.g.: "I declare you man and wife". The 'doubled' direction is therefore always world-to-word-to-world. For obvious reasons, Searle calls sentences of this type 'declarations'.

4. The null or empty direction of fit.
There is no direct question of achieving success of fit between the propositional content and the world, because success of fit is presupposed by the utterance. E.g.: "I'm glad I married you" presupposes that the speaker is married to the listener.

Searle used this notion of "direction of fit" to create a taxonomy of illocutionary acts.

Although Elizabeth Anscombe never employed the term "the direction of fit", Searle has strongly argued that the following passage from her work Intention was, by far, "the best illustration" of the distinction between the tasks of "[getting] the words (more strictly their propositional content) to match the world... [and that of getting] the world to match the words":

§32. Let us consider a man going round a town with a shopping list in his hand. Now it is clear that the relation of this list to the things he actually buys is one and the same whether his wife gave him the list or it is his own list; and that there is a different relation where a list is made by a detective following him about. If he made the list itself, it was an expression of intention; if his wife gave it him, it has the role of an order. What then is the identical relation to what happens, in the order and the intention, which is not shared by the record? It is precisely this: if the list and the things that the man actually buys do not agree, and if this and this alone constitutes a mistake, then the mistake is not in the list but in the man's performance (if his wife were to say: “Look, it says butter and you have bought margarine”, he would hardly reply: “What a mistake! we must put that right” and alter the word on the list to “margarine”); whereas if the detective's record and what the man actually buys do not agree, then the mistake is in the record.

== In philosophy of mind ==
According to Velleman, when used in the domain of the philosophy of mind, the concept direction of fit represents the distinguishing feature between two types of intentional mental states:

Facta (singular factum', states that currently exist) are states with a mind-to-world direction of fit.
Examples include beliefs, perceptions, hypotheses, and fantasies. In the event of a mismatch between the mental state and the world, the mental state is in some sense false or wrong and should perhaps be changed.

Facienda (singular faciendum, states that are yet to exist) are states with a world-to-mind direction of fit.
Examples include intentions and desires. If there is a mismatch between the mental state and the world, the world is, in some sense, wrong and should perhaps be changed.

In some forms of mind-body dualism, a matching factum and faciendum must be present in a person's mind in order for him to act intentionally. If a person has the belief that action (A) will lead to state (S), and has the desire that state (S) obtain, then he will perform action (A). The action is directly caused by simultaneous presence of the two mental states; no further explanation is needed.

According to Velleman:

The term "direction of fit" refers to the two ways in which attitudes can relate propositions to the world.
In cognitive attitudes [such as belief], a proposition is grasped as patterned after the world; whereas in conative attitudes [such as desire], the proposition is grasped as a pattern for the world to follow.
The propositional object of desire is regarded not as fact – not, that is, as factum, having been brought about – but rather as faciendum, to be brought about: it's regarded not as true but as to be made true.

Ruth Millikan has also written influentially about representations, noting that many primitive representations used by animals are characterized by a dual direction of fit; she terms such representations "pushmi-pullyu representations." As an example, she cites the role of bee dances in both informing other bees about the location of resources (indicative, or dance-to-world) and directing their action (imperative, or world-to-dance):

What then occurs in the head of a bee who understands a fellow bee's dance? Does the bee come to believe there is nectar at location L, desire to collect nectar, know that to collect nectar at L requires going to L, hence desire to go to L, hence, no other desires being stronger at the moment, decide to go to L, and proceed accordingly? Surely not. To posit anything more complicated than, as it were, a literal translation of the dance into bee mentalese is surely superfluous. The comprehending bee merely acquires an inner representation that is at the same time a picture, as it were, of the location of nectar (relative to its hive) and that guides the bee's direction of flight. The very same representation tells in one breath both what is the case and what to do about it. I call representations having this sort of double aspect "pushmi-pullyu" representations (or "PPRs") after Hugh Lofting's charming two-headed Janus-faced creature by that name.

Millikan suggests that many perceptual representations (including those in humans) have such a dual function, both providing an agent information about the state of affairs in the world and suggesting action possibilities to change that state of affairs. She further remarked on the similarity between such representations and the role of affordances in the ecological perception theory of psychologist J. J. Gibson.

However, Millikan's openness to Gibson's framework has not been typical of philosophers of mind, and later philosophers such as Bence Nanay have explored the possibility of action-oriented perception without endorsing affordance theory.

The predictive coding framework of neural representations developed by neuroscientist Karl Friston and philosopher Andy Clark has similarly been observed to be an attempt to construe representations with dual direction of fit, uniting predictions (mind-to-world) and actions (world-to-mind).

== See also ==
- Triangle of reference

== Bibliography ==
- Anscombe, G.E.M., Intention (Second Edition), Basil Blackwell, (Oxford), 1963 (first edition 1957).
- Austin, J.L., How to Do Things With Words: The William James Lectures Delivered at Harvard University in 1955, Oxford University Press, (Oxford), 1962.
- Austin, J.L., "How to Talk: Some Simple Ways", Proceedings of the Aristotelian Society, Vol.53, (1953), pp. 227–246.
- Churchland, Paul, "Conceptual progress and word/world relations: In search of the essence of natural kinds", Canadian Journal of Philosophy 15(1):1–17 (1985)
- Humberstone, I.L., "Direction of Fit", Mind, Vol.101, No.401, (January 1992), pp. 59–83.
- Kissine, Mikhail. "Direction of fit". Logique et Analyse 50.198 (2007): 113-128.
- Millikan, R.G., "Pushmi-pullyu Representations", Philosophical Perspectives Vol. 9: AI, Connectionism and Philosophical Psychology (1995), pp. 185–200.
- Millikan, R.G., "On Reading Signs: Some Differences Between Us and Others," in Evolution of Communication Systems: A Comparative Approach, ed. D. Kimbrough Oller and Ulrike Griebel, MIT Press, 2004.
- Searle, J.R., "A Taxonomy of Illocutionary Acts", pp. 1–19 in Searle, J.R., Expression and Meaning: Studies in the Theory of Speech Acts, Cambridge University Press, (Cambridge), 1979. (N.B. This is a reprint of the same paper that was published twice, in 1975 and 1976, under two different titles: (a) Searle, J.R., "A Taxonomy of Illocutionary Acts", pp. 344–369 in Gunderson, K. (ed.), Language, Mind, and Knowledge, University of Minnesota Press, (Minneapolis), 1975; and (b) Searle, J.R., "A Classification of Illocutionary Acts", Language in Society, Vol.5, (1976), pp. 1–24.)
- Searle, J.R., Expression and Meaning: Studies in the Theory of Speech Acts, Cambridge University Press, (Cambridge), 1985.
- Searle, J.R., Rationality in Action, The MIT Press, (Cambridge, Massachusetts), 2001.
- Searle, J.R. & Vanderveken, D., Foundations of Illocutionary Logic, Cambridge University Press, (Cambridge), 1985.
- Velleman, J.D., "The Guise of the Good", Noûs, Vol.26, No.1, (March 1992), pp. 3–26.
