= Francis Graham Crookshank =

Physician and medical writer

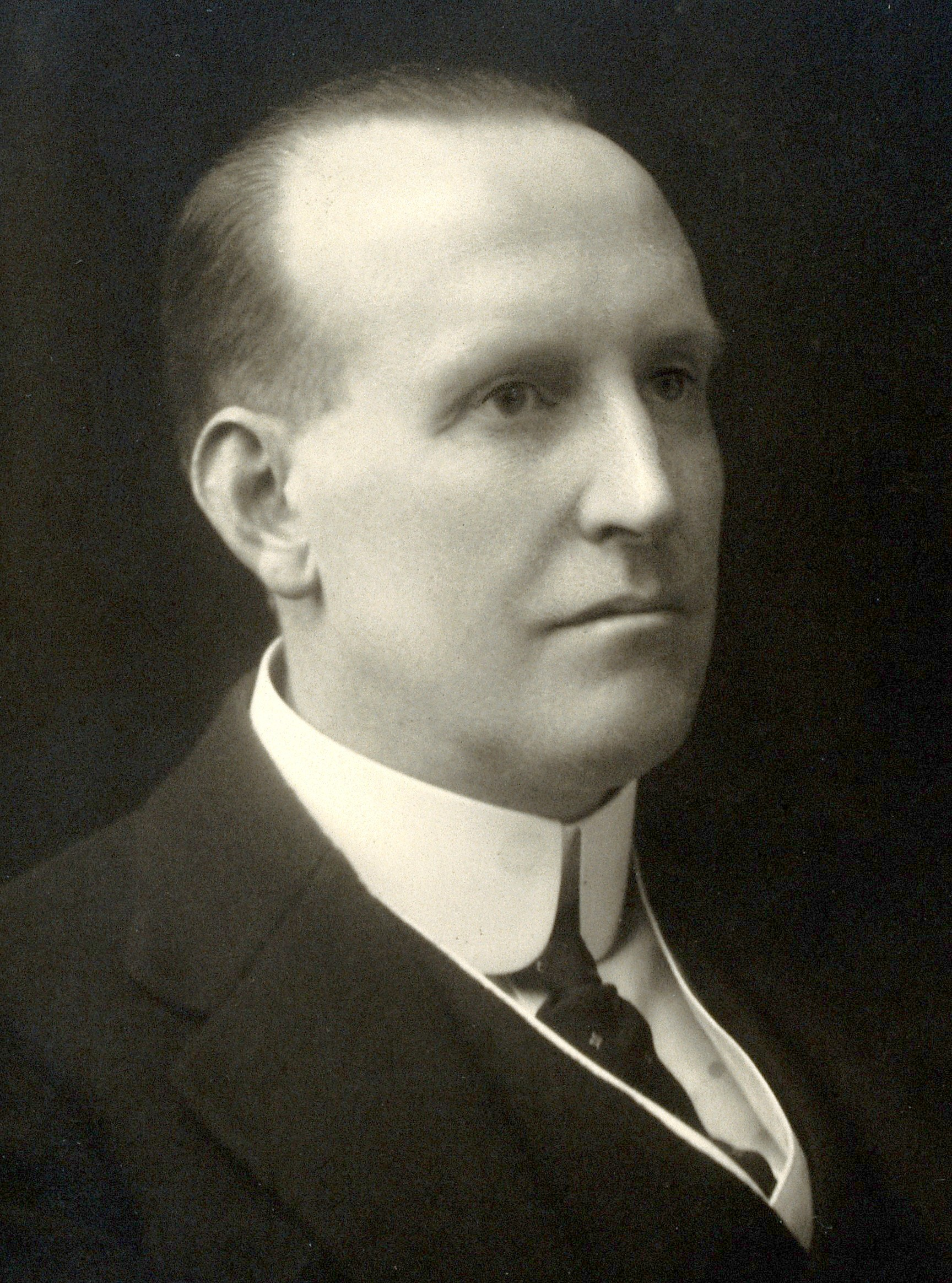
Crookshank in 1933

Francis Graham Crookshank (1873, Wimbledon – 27 October 1933, Wimpole Street, London) was a British epidemiologist, and a medical and psychological writer, and Fellow of the Royal College of Physicians.

Crookshank was educated at University College London and trained in medicine at University College Hospital. His work attempted to combine medicine with the individual psychology of Alfred Adler, along with eugenics and Nietzsche's philosophy of the will.

His 123-page scientific racist publication The Mongol in our Midst (1924) was both popular and controversial in both England and the United States. In 1931, Crookshank published a "greatly enlarged and entirely rewritten" 524-page edition "with numerous illustrations," with responses to critics and additional theories and claims. That work incorrectly associated the disorder now known as Down syndrome with the admixture of Asian and European "blood".

Crookshank died in 1933 at his house in Wimpole Street, Westminster, from suicide.

== Works ==
- Flatulence and shock, London: Lewis, 1912.
- Chapter on medico-legal aspects. etc., in L. W. Harrison, The diagnosis and treatment of venereal diseases in general practice, London: H. Frowde and Hodder & Stoughton, 1921
- ‘The importance of a theory of signs and a critique of language in the study of medicine’, in C. K. Ogden and I. A. Richards, The Meaning of Meaning, London, 1923. The International Library of Psychology, Philosophy and Scientific Method.
- The Mongol in our Midst: A Study of Man and his Three Faces, (London: Kegan Paul, Trench, Trubner 1924 and 1931).
- Migraine and other common neuroses; a psychological study, London: Paul, Trench, Trubner, 1926.
- Introduction to Paul Masson-Oursel, Comparative philosophy, London: Paul, Trench, Trubner, 1926. The International Library of Psychology, Philosophy and Scientific Method.
- ‘The relation of history and philosophy to medicine’, in Charles Greene Cumston, An introduction to the history of medicine, from the time of the pharaohs to the end of the XVIIIth century, London: K. Paul, Trench, Trubner & co, 1926
- 'Individual Psychology: A Retrospect (and a Valuation)', prefatory essay to Alfred Adler, Problems of neurosis: a book of case-histories, ed. Philip Mairet, London: K. Paul, Trench, Trubner, 1929, pp. vii-xxxvii
- Epidemiological essays, 1930
