= De dicto and de re =

Distinction in formal semantics

De dicto and de re are two phrases used to mark a distinction in intensional statements, associated with the intensional operators in many such statements. The distinction is used regularly in analytical metaphysics and in philosophy of language.

The literal translation of the phrase de dicto is "about what is said", whereas de re translates as "about the thing". The distinction can be understood by examples of intensional contexts of which three are considered here: a context of thought, a context of desire, and a context of modality.

== Context of thought ==
There are two possible interpretations of the sentence "Peter believes someone is out to get him":

On the de dicto interpretation, someone is unspecific and Peter suffers a general paranoia; he believes that it is true that a person is out to get him, but does not necessarily have any beliefs about who this person may be. What Peter believes is that the predication "someone is out to get Peter" is satisfied.

On the de re interpretation, someone is specific, picking out some particular individual. There is some person Peter has in mind, and Peter believes that person is out to get him.

In the context of thought, the distinction helps us explain how people can hold seemingly self-contradictory beliefs. Say Lois Lane believes Clark Kent is weaker than Superman. Since Clark Kent is Superman, taken de re, Lois' belief is irrational: the names Clark Kent and Superman both pick out the same individual, and a person (or super-person) cannot be stronger than himself. Understood de dicto, however, this may be a perfectly reasonable belief: since Lois is not aware that Clark and Superman are one and the same, her belief is merely that one individual is stronger than another.

== Context of desire ==
Consider the sentence "Jana wants to marry the tallest man in Fulsom County". It could be read either de dicto or de re; the meanings would be different. One interpretation is that Jana wants to marry the tallest man in Fulsom County, whomever he might be. On this interpretation, what the statement tells us is that Jana has a certain unspecific desire: what she desires is for Jana is marrying the tallest man in Fulsom County to be true. The desire is directed at that situation, regardless of how it is to be achieved. The other interpretation is that Jana wants to marry a certain man, who in fact happens to be the tallest man in Fulsom County. Her desire is for that man, and she desires herself to marry him. The first interpretation is the de dicto interpretation, because Jana's desire relates to the words "the tallest man in Fulsom County", and the second interpretation is the de re interpretation, because Jana's desire relates to the man to which those words refer.

Another way to understand the distinction is to ask what Jana would want if a nine-foot-tall immigrant moved to Fulsom county. If she continued to want to marry the same man that she had previously wished to marry (and perceived this as representing no change in her desires), then she could be taken to have meant the original statement in a de re sense. If she no longer wanted to marry that man, but instead now wished to marry the immigrant – i.e., the new tallest man in Fulsom County – and saw this as a continuation of her earlier desire, then she meant the original statement in a de dicto sense.

== Context of modality ==
The number of discovered chemical elements is 118. Take the sentence "The number of chemical elements is necessarily greater than 100". Again, there are two interpretations as per the de dicto/de re distinction.

- The de dicto interpretation $\Box \exists{N_{chem}} (N_{chem}>100)$ says that, in other accessible possible worlds, even if the inner workings of the atom could differ (so that $N_{chem}$ have different values), the number of elements still could not be 100 or fewer.
- The de re interpretation $\exists{N_{chem}}\Box (N_{chem}>100)$ says that, the inner workings of the atom are what they are ($N_{chem}=118$ in all accessible possible worlds), and the number 118 is greater than 100.

Another example: "The President of the US in 2001 could not have been Al Gore".

- The de dicto reading $\Box \exists{Pres_{2001}} (Pres_{2001}\neq Al)$ says that, in other accessible possible worlds, even if the result of the 2000 election could differ, the President of the US in 2001 still could not have been Al Gore. This claim seems false; presumably, in some other accessible possible worlds where the Supreme Court did not rule that Bush had won the election, Al Gore could have been the President of the US in 2001 in that possible world.
- The de re reading $\exists{Pres_{2001}}\Box (Pres_{2001}\neq Al)$ says that, the President of the US in 2001 is who he is, and that is George Bush in all accessible possible worlds, and George Bush could not have been Al Gore.

== Representing de dicto and de re in modal logic ==
In modal logic the distinction between de dicto and de re is one of scope. In de dicto claims, any existential quantifiers are within the scope of the modal operator, whereas in de re claims the modal operator falls within the scope of the existential quantifier. For example:

De dicto:	$\Box \exists{x} Ax$	Necessarily, some x is such that it is A
De re:	$\exists{x} \Box Ax$	Some x is such that it is necessarily A

Generally speaking, $\Box \forall{x} Ax$ is logically equivalent to $\forall{x} \Box Ax$, both meaning that all x in all the possible worlds are A (assuming that the range of quantification/domain of discourse is the same in all the accessible possible worlds); However, $\Box \exists{x} Ax$ means that each accessible possible world has its own x that is A, but they are not necessarily the same, whereas $\exists{x} \Box Ax$ means that there is a special x that is A in all accessible possible worlds.

Similarly, $\Diamond \exists{x} Ax$ is logically equivalent to $\exists{x} \Diamond Ax$, both meaning that in some accessible possible world, there is some x that is A; However, $\Diamond \forall{x} Ax$ means that in some accessible possible world, all x are A, whereas $\forall{x} \Diamond Ax$ means that for each x in the range of quantification/domain of discourse, there is some accessible possible world where x is A, but it can be true that no world has two x that are both A.

== See also ==
- Barcan formula
- De se
- Evaluation strategy
- Latitudinarianism (philosophy)
- Modal scope fallacy
- Quantifier raising
- Sense and reference
- Temperature paradox

== Bibliography ==
- Burge, Tyler. 1977. Belief de re. Journal of Philosophy 74, 338-362.
- Donnellan, Keith S. 1966. Reference and definite descriptions. Philosophical Review 75, 281-304.
- Frege, Gottlob. 1892. Über Sinn und Bedeutung. Zeitschrift für Philosophie und philosophische Kritik 100, 25-50. Translated as On sense and reference by Peter Geach & Max Black, 1970, in Translations from the philosophical writings of Gottlob Frege. Oxford, Blackwell, 56-78.
- Kaplan, David. 1978. Dthat. In Peter Cole, ed., Syntax and Semantics, vol. 9: Pragmatics. New York: Academic Press, 221-243
- Kripke, Saul. 1977. Speaker's reference and semantic reference. In Peter A. French, Theodore E. Uehling, Jr., and Howard K. Wettstein, eds., Midwest Studies in Philosophy vol. II: Studies in the philosophy of language. Morris, MN: University of Minnesota, 255-276.
- Larson, Richard & Gabriel Segal. 1995. Definite descriptions. In Knowledge of meaning: An introduction to semantic theory. Cambridge, MA: MIT Press, 319-359.
- Ludlow, Peter & Stephen Neale. 1991. Indefinite descriptions: In defense of Russell. Linguistics and Philosophy 14, 171-202.
- Ostertag, Gary. 1998. Introduction. In Gary Ostertag, ed., Definite descriptions: a reader. Cambridge, MA: MIT Press, 1-34.
- Russell, Bertrand. 1905. On denoting. Mind 14, 479-493.
- Wettstein, Howard. 1981. Demonstrative reference and definite descriptions. Philosophical Studies 40, 241-257.
- Wilson, George M. 1991. Reference and pronominal descriptions. Journal of Philosophy 88, 359-387.
