= I. A. Richards =

English literary critic (1893–1979)

I. A. Richards CH
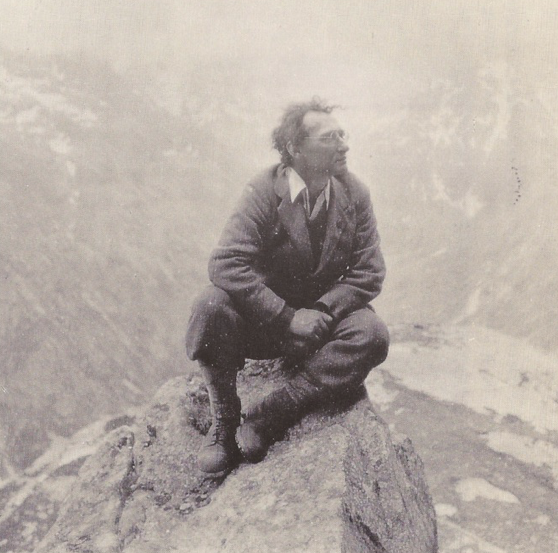
- I. A. Richards in the Alps c. 1930
- Born: Ivor Armstrong Richards; 26 February 1893; Sandbach, Cheshire, England
- Died: 7 September 1979 (aged 86); Cambridge, England
- Education: Magdalene College, Cambridge
- Occupation: Educator
- Spouse: Dorothy Pilley Richards (m. 1926)
- Writing career
- Period: 20th century

Ivor Armstrong Richards CH (26 February 1893 – 7 September 1979), known as I. A. Richards, was an English educator, literary critic, poet, and rhetorician. His work contributed to the foundations of New Criticism, a formalist movement in literary theory which emphasized the close reading of a literary text, especially poetry, in an effort to discover how a work of literature functions as a self-contained and self-referential æsthetic object.

Richards' intellectual contributions to the establishment of the literary methodology of New Criticism are presented in the books The Meaning of Meaning: A Study of the Influence of Language upon Thought and of the Science of Symbolism (1923), by C. K. Ogden and I. A. Richards, Principles of Literary Criticism (1924), Practical Criticism (1929), and The Philosophy of Rhetoric (1936).

== Biography ==
Richards was born in Sandbach. He was educated at Clifton College and Magdalene College, Cambridge, where his intellectual talents were developed by the scholar Charles Hicksonn 'Cabby' Spence. He began his career without formal training in literature; he studied philosophy (the "moral sciences") at Cambridge University, from which derived his assertions that, in the 20th century, literary study cannot and should not be undertaken as a specialisation, in and of itself, but studied alongside a cognate field, such as philosophy, psychology or rhetoric. His early teaching appointments were as adjunct faculty: at Cambridge, Magdalene College would not pay a salary for Richards to teach the new, and untested, academic field of English literature. Instead, like an old-style instructor, he collected weekly tuition directly from the students as they entered the classroom.

Richards was appointed a college lecturer in English and moral sciences at Magdalene in 1922. Four years later, when the Faculty of English at Cambridge was formally established, he was awarded a permanent post as a university lecturer. In the 1929–30 biennium, as a visiting professor, he taught Basic English and Poetry at Tsinghua University, Beijing. In the 1936–38 triennium, he was the director of the Orthological Institute of China. Eventually tiring of academic life at Cambridge, in 1939 he accepted an offer to teach in the school of education at Harvard University. Appointed a professor in 1944, he remained there until his retirement in 1963. In 1974, he returned to Cambridge, having retained his fellowship at Magdalene, and lived in Wentworth House in the grounds of the college until his death five years later.

In 1926, Richards married Dorothy Pilley, whom he had met on a mountain climbing holiday in Wales. She died in 1986. Pilley's book recounts many of the climbs they did together in the 1920s and 1930s, including their celebrated 1928 first ascent of the north, north west ridge of the Dent Blanche in the Swiss Alps.

== Contributions ==
=== Collaborations with C. K. Ogden ===
The life and intellectual influence of I. A. Richards approximately corresponds to his intellectual interests; many endeavours were in collaboration with the linguist, philosopher, and writer Charles Kay Ogden (C. K. Ogden), notably in four books:

I. Foundations of Aesthetics (1922) presents the principles of aesthetic reception, the bases of the literary theory of “harmony”; aesthetic understanding derives from the balance of competing psychological impulses. The structure of the Foundations of Aesthetics—a survey of the competing definitions of the term æsthetic—prefigures the multiple-definitions work in the books Basic Rules of Reason (1933), Mencius on the Mind: Experiments in Multiple Definition (1932), and Coleridge on Imagination (1934)

II. The Meaning of Meaning: A Study of the Influence of Language upon Thought and of the Science of Symbolism (1923) presents the triadic theory of semiotics that depends upon psychological theory, and so anticipates the importance of psychology in the exercise of literary criticism. Semioticians, such as Umberto Eco, acknowledged that the methodology of the triadic theory of semiotics improved upon the methodology of the dyadic theory of semiotics presented by Ferdinand de Saussure (1857–1913).

III. Basic English: A General Introduction with Rules and Grammar (1930) describes a simplified English based upon a vocabulary of 850 words.

IV. The Times of India Guide to Basic English (1938) sought to develop Basic English as an international auxiliary language, an interlanguage.

Richards' travels, especially in China, effectively situated him as the advocate for an international program, such as Basic English. Moreover, at Harvard University, in his international pedagogy, he began to integrate the available new media for mass communications, especially television.

=== Aesthetics and literary criticism ===
==== Theory ====
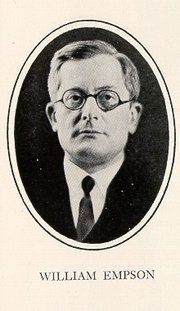
The poet and literary critic William Empson (1906–84) developed the methodology of New Criticism with the practice of close reading of literary works, prose and poetry; his best-known work is Seven Types of Ambiguity (1930).

Richards elaborated on an approach to literary criticism in The Principles of Literary Criticism (1924) and Practical Criticism (1929) which embodied aspects of the scientific approach from his study of psychology, particularly that of Charles Scott Sherrington.

In The Principles of Literary Criticism, Richards discusses the subjects of form, value, rhythm, coenesthesia (an awareness of inhabiting one's body, caused by stimuli from various organs), literary infectiousness, allusiveness, divergent readings, and belief. He starts from the premise that "A book is a machine to think with, but it need not, therefore, usurp the functions either of the bellows or the locomotive."

Practical Criticism (1929), is an empirical study of inferior response to a literary text. As an instructor in English literature at Cambridge University, Richards tested the critical-thinking abilities of his pupils; he removed authorial and contextual information from thirteen poems and asked undergraduates to write interpretations, in order to ascertain the likely impediments to an adequate response to a literary text. That experiment in the pedagogical approach—critical reading without contexts—demonstrated the variety and depth of the possible textual misreadings that might be committed, by university students and laymen alike.

The critical method derived from that pedagogical approach did not propose a new hermeneutics, a new methodology of interpretation, but questioned the purposes and efficacy of the critical process of literary interpretation, by analysing the self-reported critical interpretations of university students. To that end, effective critical work required a closer aesthetic interpretation of the literary text as an object.

To substantiate interpretive criticism, Richards provided theories of metaphor, value, and tone, of stock response, incipient action, and pseudo-statement; and of ambiguity. This last subject, the theory of ambiguity, was developed in Seven Types of Ambiguity (1930), by William Empson, a former student of Richards'; moreover, additional to The Principles of Literary Criticism and Practical Criticism, Empson's book on ambiguity became the third foundational document for the methodology of the New Criticism.

To Richards, literary criticism was impressionistic, too abstract to be readily grasped and understood, by most readers; and he proposed that literary criticism could be precise in communicating meanings, by way of denotation and connotation. To establish critical precision, Richards examined the psychological processes of writing and reading poetry. In reading poetry and making sense of it "in the degree in which we can order ourselves, we need nothing more"; the reader need not believe the poetry, because the literary importance of poetry is in provoking emotions in the reader.

==== New rhetoric ====
As a rhetorician, Richards said that the old form of studying rhetoric (the art of discourse) was too concerned with the mechanics of formulating arguments and with conflict; instead, he proposed the New Rhetoric to study the meaning of the parts of discourse, as "a study of misunderstanding and its remedies" to determine how language works. That ambiguity is expected, and that meanings (denotation and connotation) are not inherent to words, but are inherent to the perception of the reader, the listener, and the viewer. By their usages, compiled from experience, people decide and determine meaning by "how words are used in a sentence", in spoken and written language.

===== The semantic triangle =====
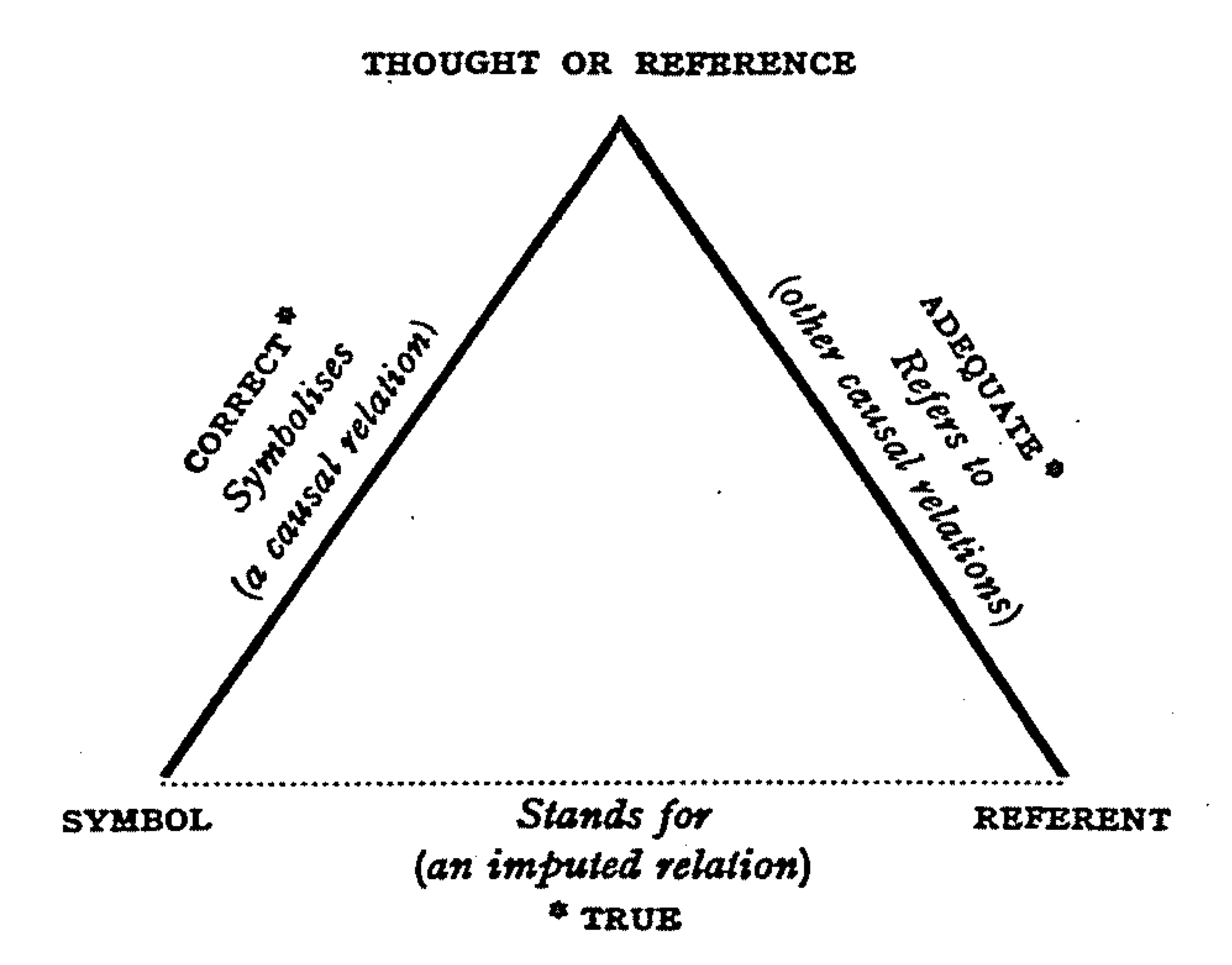
The semantic triangle

Richards and Ogden created the semantic triangle to deliver an improved understanding of how words come to mean. The semantic triangle has three parts, the symbol or word, the referent, and the thought or reference. In the bottom, right corner is the referent, the thing, in reality. Placed in the left corner is the symbol or word. At the top point, the convergence of the literal word and the object in reality; it is our intangible idea about the object. Ultimately, the English meaning of the words is determined by an individual's unique experience.

=== Feedforward ===
When the Saturday Review asked Richards to write a piece for their "What I Have Learned" series, Richards (then aged 75) took the opportunity to expound upon his cybernetic concept of "feedforward". The Oxford English Dictionary records that Richards coined the term feedforward in 1951 at the Eighth Macy Conferences on cybernetics. In the event, the term extended the intellectual and critical influence of Richards to cybernetics which applied the term in a variety of contexts. Moreover, among Richards' students was Marshall McLuhan, who also applied and developed the term and the concept of feedforward.

According to Richards, feedforward is the concept of anticipating the effect of one's words by acting as our own critic. It is thought to work in the opposite direction of feedback, though it works essentially towards the same goal: to clarify unclear concepts. Existing in all forms of communication, feedforward acts as a pretest that any writer can use to anticipate the impact of their words on their audience. According to Richards, feedforward allows the writer to then engage with their text to make necessary changes to create a better effect. He believes that communicators who do not use feedforward will seem dogmatic. Richards wrote more in depth about the idea and importance of feedforward in communication in his book Speculative Instruments and said that feedforward was his most important learned concept.

=== Influence ===
Richards served as a mentor and teacher to other prominent critics, most notably William Empson and F. R. Leavis, although Leavis was contemporary with Richards, and Empson was much younger. Other critics primarily influenced by his writings included Cleanth Brooks and Allen Tate. Later critics who refined the formalist approach to New Criticism by actively rejecting his psychological emphasis included, besides Brooks and Tate, John Crowe Ransom, W. K. Wimsatt, R. P. Blackmur, and Murray Krieger. R. S. Crane of the Chicago School was both indebted to Richards's theory and critical of its psychological assumptions. They all admitted the value of his seminal ideas but sought to salvage what they considered his most useful assumptions from the theoretical excesses they felt he brought to bear in his criticism. Like Empson, Richards proved a difficult model for the New Critics, but his model of close reading provided the basis for their interpretive methodology.

==== Works ====
- The Foundations of Aesthetics (George Allen and Unwin: London, 1922); co-authored with C. K. Ogden, and James Wood. 2nd ed. with revised preface, (Lear Publishers: New York 1925).
- The Principles of Literary Criticism (Kegan Paul, Trench, Trubner: London, 1924; New York, 1925); subsequent eds.: London 1926 (with two new appendices), New York 1926; London 1926, with new preface, New York, April 1926; and 1928, with a revised preface.
- Science and Poetry (Kegan Paul, Trench, Trubner: London, 1926).; reset edition, New York, W. W. Norton, 1926; 2nd ed., revised and enlarged: Kegan Paul, Trench, Trubner: London, 1935. The 1935 edition was reset, with a preface, a commentary, and the essay, “How Does a Poem Know When it is Finished” (1963), as Poetries and Sciences (W. W. Norton: New York and London, 1970).
- Practical Criticism (Kegan Paul, Trench, Trubner: London, 1929); revised edition, 1930.
- Coleridge on Imagination (Kegan Paul, Trench, Trubner: London, 1934; New York, 1935); revised editions with a new preface, New York and London 1950; Bloomington, 1960; reprints 1950, with new foreword by Richards, and an introduction by K. Raine.
- The Philosophy of Rhetoric (Oxford UP: London, 1936).
- Speculative Instruments (Routledge & Kegan Paul: London, 1955).
- So Much Nearer: Essays toward a World English (Harcourt, Brace & World: New York, 1960, 1968), includes the essay, "The Future of Poetry".

=== Rhetoric, semiotics and prose interpretation ===
==== Works ====
- The Meaning of Meaning: A Study of the Influence of Language upon Thought and of the Science of Symbolism. Co-authored with C. K. Ogden. With an introduction by J. P. Postgate, and supplementary essays by Bronisław Malinowski, 'The Problem of Meaning in Primitive Languages', and F. G. Crookshank, 'The Importance of a Theory of Signs and a Critique of Language in the Study of Medicine'. London and New York, 1923.

1st: 1923 (Preface Date: Jan. 1923)
2nd: 1927 (Preface Date: June 1926)
3rd: 1930 (Preface Date: Jan. 1930)
4th: 1936 (Preface Date: May 1936)
5th: 1938 (Preface Date: June 1938)
8th: 1946 (Preface Date: May 1946)
NY: 1989 (with a preface by Umberto Eco)

- Mencius on the Mind: Experiments in Multiple Definition (Kegan Paul, Trench, Trubner & Co.: London; Harcourt, Brace: New York, 1932).
- Basic Rules of Reason (Kegan Paul, Trench, Trubner & Co.: London, 1933).
- The Philosophy of Rhetoric (Oxford University Press: New York and London, 1936).
- Interpretation in Teaching (Routledge & Kegan Paul: London; Harcourt, Brace: New York, 1938). Subsequent editions: 1973 (with 'Retrospect').
- Basic in Teaching: East and West (Kegan Paul, Trench, Trubner: London, 1935).
- How To Read a Page: A Course in Effective Reading, With an Introduction to a Hundred Great Words (W. W. Norton: New York, 1942; Routledge & Kegan Paul: London, 1943). Subsequent editions: 1959 (Beacon Press: Boston. With new 'Introduction').
- The Wrath of Achilles: The Iliad of Homer, Shortened and in a New Translation (W. W. Norton: New York, 1950; Routledge & Kegan Paul: London, 1951).
- So Much Nearer: Essays toward a World English (Harcourt, Brace & World: New York, 1960, 1968). Includes the important essay, "The Future of Poetry."
- Complementarities: Uncollected Essays, ed. by John Paul Russo (Harvard University Press: Cambridge, Massachusetts, 1976).
- Times of India Guide to Basic English (Bombay: The Times of India Press), 1938; Odgen, C. K. & Richards, I. A.

== See also ==
- M. H. Abrams
