= Propositional attitude =

Concept in epistemology

A propositional attitude is a mental state held by an agent or organism toward a proposition. In philosophy, propositional attitudes can be considered to be neurally realized, causally efficacious, content-bearing internal states (personal principles/values). Linguistically, propositional attitudes are denoted by a verb (e.g. believed) governing an embedded "that" clause, for example, 'Sally believed that she had won'.

Propositional attitudes are often assumed to be the fundamental units of thought and their contents, being propositions, are true or false from the perspective of the person. An agent can have different propositional attitudes toward the same proposition (e.g., "S believes that her ice-cream is cold," and "S fears that her ice-cream is cold"). Propositional attitudes have directions of fit: some are meant to reflect the world, others to influence it.

One topic of central concern is the relation between the modalities of assertion and belief, as well as intention. A person's assertions may not conform to their beliefs. When the departure of assertion from belief is intentional, it is called a lie.

Other comparisons of multiple modalities that frequently arise are the relationships between belief and knowledge and the discrepancies that occur among observations, expectations, and intentions. Deviations of observations from expectations are commonly perceived as surprises, phenomena that call for explanations to reduce the shock of amazement.

== Issues ==
In logic, the formal properties of verbs like assert, believe, command, consider, deny, doubt, imagine, judge, know, want, wish, and a host of others that involve attitudes or intentions toward propositions are notorious for their recalcitrance to analysis. (Quine 1956).

=== Indiscernibility of identicals ===
One of the fundamental principles governing identity is that of substitutivity, also known as fungibility — or, as it might well be called, that of indiscernibility of identicals. It provides that, given a true statement of identity, one of its two terms may be substituted for the other in any true statement and the result will be true. It is easy to find cases contrary to this principle. For example, the statements:

(1) Giorgione = Barbarelli,
(2) Giorgione was so called because of his size.

are true; however, replacement of the name Giorgione by the name Barbarelli turns (2) into the falsehood:

(3) Barbarelli was so called because of his size.

Willard Van Orman Quine's example here refers to Giorgio Barbarelli's sobriquet "Giorgione", an Italian name roughly glossed as "Big George." The basis of the paradox here is that while the two names signify the same individual (the meaning of the first statement), the names are not themselves identical; the second statement refers to an attribute (origin) that they do not share. (Note: See "Who's on First?.")

== Overview ==
Bertrand Russell introduced the idea of handling propositions like this:

What sort of name shall we give to verbs like 'believe' and 'wish' and so forth? I should be inclined to call them 'propositional verbs'. This is merely a suggested name for convenience, because they are verbs which have the form of relating an object to a proposition. As I have been explaining, that is not what they really do, but it is convenient to call them propositional verbs. Of course you might call them 'attitudes', but I should not like that because it is a psychological term, and although all the instances in our experience are psychological, there is no reason to suppose that all the verbs I am talking of are psychological. There is never any reason to suppose that sort of thing.

How one feels about or regards a proposition is different than what a proposition is – they can be accepted, asserted, believed, commanded, contested, declared, denied, doubted, enjoined, exclaimed, or expected, for example. Different attitudes toward propositions are called propositional attitudes; they are also discussed under the headings of intentionality and linguistic modality.

Many problematic situations in real life arise from the circumstance that many different propositions in many different modalities are in the air at once. In order to compare propositions of different colours and flavours, as it were, there is no basis for comparison but to examine the underlying propositions themselves, returning to matters of language and logic. Despite the name, propositional attitudes are not regarded as psychological attitudes proper, since the formal disciplines of linguistics and logic are concerned with nothing more concrete than what can be said in general about their formal properties and their patterns of interaction.

== See also ==
- Accessibility relation
- Affect (linguistics)
- Attitude
- Belief
- Disposition
- Embedded clause
- Habit
- Intensionality
- Jerry Fodor
- Knowledge
- Responsive predicate
- Qualia
- Self-fulfilling prophecy
- Truth

== Bibliography ==
- Awbrey, J. and Awbrey, S. (1995), "Interpretation as Action: The Risk of Inquiry", Inquiry: Critical Thinking Across the Disciplines 15, 40–52.
- Cresswell, M. J. (1985), Structured meanings. The semantics of propositional attitudes. MIT Press, Cambridge & London 1985.
- Quine, W. V. O. (1956), "Quantifiers and Propositional Attitudes", Journal of Philosophy 53 (1956). Reprinted, pp. 185–196 in Quine (1976), Ways of Paradox.
- Quine, W. V. O. (1976), The Ways of Paradox, and Other Essays, 1st edition, 1966. Revised and enlarged edition, Harvard University Press, Cambridge, MA, 1976.
- Quine, W. V. O. (1980), From a Logical Point of View, Logico-Philosophical Essays, 2nd edition, Harvard University Press, Cambridge, MA.
- Quine, W. V. O. (1980), "Reference and Modality", pp. 139–159 in Quine (1980 a), From a Logical Point of View.
- Ramsey, F. P. (1927), "Facts and Propositions", Aristotelian Society Supplementary Volume 7, 153–170. Reprinted, pp. 34–51 in F.P. Ramsey, Philosophical Papers, David Hugh Mellor (ed.), Cambridge University Press, Cambridge, UK, 1990.
- Ramsey, F. P. (1990), Philosophical Papers, David Hugh Mellor (ed.), Cambridge University Press, Cambridge, UK.
- Runes, Dagobert D. (ed.), Dictionary of Philosophy, Littlefield, Adams, and Company, Totowa, NJ, 1962.
- Russell, Bertrand (1912), The Problems of Philosophy, 1st published 1912. Reprinted, Galaxy Book, Oxford University Press, New York, NY, 1959. Reprinted, Prometheus Books, Buffalo, NY, 1988.
- Russell, Bertrand (1918), "The Philosophy of Logical Atomism", The Monist, 1918. Reprinted, pp. 177–281 in Logic and Knowledge: Essays 1901–1950, Robert Charles Marsh (ed.), Unwin Hyman, London, UK, 1956. Reprinted, pp. 35–155 in The Philosophy of Logical Atomism, David Pears (ed.), Open Court, La Salle, IL, 1985.
- Russell, Bertrand (1956), Logic and Knowledge: Essays 1901–1950, Robert Charles Marsh (ed.), Unwin Hyman, London, UK, 1956. Reprinted, Routledge, London, UK, 1992.
- Russell, Bertrand (1985), The Philosophy of Logical Atomism, David Pears (ed.), Open Court, La Salle, IL.
