= Charles Kay Ogden =

British linguist, philosopher and writer (1889-1957)

- Born: 1 June 1889; Fleetwood, Lancashire, England
- Died: 20 March 1957 (aged 67); London, England

Education
- Education: Magdalene College, Cambridge (MA, 1915)

Philosophical work
- Era: Contemporary philosophy
- Region: Western philosophy
- School: British pragmatism
- Main interests: Philosophy of language
- Notable ideas: Semantic triangle, Basic English

Charles Kay Ogden (/ˈɒɡdən/; 1 June 1889 – 20 March 1957) was a British linguist, philosopher, and writer. Described as a polymath but also an eccentric and outsider, he took part in many ventures related to literature, politics, the arts, and philosophy, having a broad effect particularly as an editor, translator, and activist on behalf of a reformed version of the English language. He is typically defined as a linguistic psychologist, and is now mostly remembered as the inventor and propagator of Basic English.

== Early life and education ==
Charles Kay Ogden was born at Rossall School in Fleetwood, Lancashire, on 1 June 1889 to Charles Burdett Ogden (13 July 1849 – 10 December 1923) and Fanny Hart (1850 – 21 December 1944), who were married in 1888 at Chorlton, Lancashire. His father was employed in various capacities at the Rossall School during the years 1873–1909.

Charles Kay Ogden was educated at Buxton and Rossall, won a scholarship to Magdalene College, Cambridge, and commenced his undergraduate study of Classics in 1908.

He visited continental Europe to investigate methods of language teaching in 1912 and 1913. Ogden obtained a MA in 1915.

== Career ==
=== The Heretics Society ===
In 1909, while still an undergraduate, Ogden co-founded the Heretics Society in Cambridge which questioned traditional authorities in general and religious dogmas in particular, in the wake of the paper Prove All Things, read by William Chawner, Master of Emmanuel College, a past Vice-Chancellor. The Heretics began as a group of 12 undergraduates interested in Chawner's agnostic approach.

The Society was nonconformist and open to women, and Jane Harrison found an audience there, publishing her inaugural talk for the Society of 7 December 1909 as the essay Heresy and Humanity (1911), an argument that warned of the dangers of group-think and implored the audience to realize that we are constantly negotiating the line between egotism and herd instinct, but that how we navigate that line matters. Investigating the origins of the word 'heresy'; her lecture, later published in Alpha and Omega (1915), challenged many of the religious restrictions and rules of the Anglican Church and its connections with the university. The talk of the following day was from J. M. E. McTaggart, and was also published, as Dare to Be Wise (1910). Another early member with anthropological interests was John Layard; Herbert Felix Jolowicz, Frank Plumpton Ramsey and Philip Sargant Florence were among the members. Alix Sargant Florence, sister of Philip, was active both as a Heretic and on the editorial board of the Cambridge Magazine.

Ogden was President of the Heretics from 1911, for more than a decade; he invited a variety of prominent speakers and linked the Society to his role as editor. In November 1911 G. K. Chesterton used a well-publicised talk to the Heretics, titled The Future of Religion, to reply to George Bernard Shaw, who in May had talked on The Religion of the Future. On this occasion Chesterton produced one of his well known bons mots:

Questioner: ... I say it is perfectly true that I have an intuition that I exist.
Mr. Chesterton: Cherish it.

In 1912 T. E. Hulme and Bertrand Russell spoke. Hulme's talk on Anti-Romanticism and Original Sin was written up by Ogden for the Cambridge Magazine, where in 1916 both Hulme and Russell would write on the war, from their opposite points of view. Rupert Brooke addressed them on contemporary theatre, and an article based on his views of Strindberg appeared in the Cambridge Magazine in October 1913. Another talk from 1913 that was published was from Edward Clodd on Obscurantism in Modern Science. Ogden was very active at this period in seeing these works into print.

On 4 February 1923, the biologist J.B.S. Haldane lectured the Society on "Daedalus; or, Science and the Future", a speculative vision that enjoyed some success in print and spurred in 1924 a less optimistic response from Bertrand Russell entitled "Icarus or the Future of Science".

The Heretics continued as a well-known forum, with Virginia Woolf on 18 May 1924 using it to formulate a reply to criticisms from Arnold Bennett arising from her Jacob's Room (1922), in a talk Character in Fiction that was then published in The Criterion. This paper contains the assertion, now proverbial, that "on or about December 1910 human character changed". The Heretics met in November 1929, when Ludwig Wittgenstein lectured to it on ethics, at Ogden's invitation, producing in A Lecture on Ethics a work accepted as part of the early Wittgenstein canon.

=== Cambridge Magazine ===
In 1912 Ogden founded the weekly Cambridge Magazine, which he edited until it ceased publication in 1922. The initial period was troubled. Ogden was studying for Part II of the Classical Tripos when offered the chance to start the magazine by Charles Granville, who ran a small but significant London publishing house, Stephen Swift & Co. Thinking that the editorship would mean giving up first class honours, Ogden consulted Henry Jackson, who advised him not to miss the opportunity. Shortly after, Stephen Swift & Co. went bankrupt. Ogden continued to edit the magazine during World War I, when its nature changed, because rheumatic fever as a teenager had left him unfit for military service.

Ogden often used the pseudonym Adelyne More (add-a-line more) in his journalism. The magazine included literary contributions by Siegfried Sassoon, John Masefield, Thomas Hardy, George Bernard Shaw and Arnold Bennett.

It evolved into an organ of international comment on politics and the war, supported in the background by a group of Cambridge academics including Edward Dent (who sent Sassoon's work), Theo Bartholomew and Goldsworthy Lowes Dickinson. A survey of the foreign press filled more than half of each issue, being the Notes from the foreign press supplied by Dorothy Buxton which appeared there from October 1915 onwards until 1920, and its circulation rose to over 20,000. Buxton was in fact then leading a large team translating and collating articles from up to 100 foreign newspapers; for instance, Italian articles were supplied in translation in numbers by Dent. This digest of European press coverage was exclusive to the Magazine, and gave it disproportionate influence in political circles. For example, Robert Reid, 1st Earl Loreburn, used the Notes from the foreign press to advocate to the Marquess of Lansdowne in 1916 against bellicose claims and attitudes on the British side.

During 1917 the Magazine came under heavy criticism, with its neutral use of foreign press extracts being called pacifism, particularly by the pro-war patriotic Fight for Right Movement headed by Francis Younghusband. Dorothy Buxton's husband Charles Roden Buxton was closely associated with the Union of Democratic Control. Sir Frederick Pollock, who chaired Fight for Right, wrote to The Morning Post in February 1917 charging the Magazine with pacifist propaganda, and with playing on its connection with the university as if it had official status. Gilbert Murray, a supporter of Fight for Right but also a defender of many conscientious objectors and the freedom of the press, intervened to protest, gaining support from Bennett and Hardy. John George Butcher, Conservative Member of Parliament for the City of York, asked a question in Parliament about government advertising in the Magazine, during November 1917. The parliamentary exchange had two Liberal Party politicians, William Pringle and Josiah Wedgwood, pointing out that the Magazine was the only way they could read German press comments.

The Cambridge Magazine continued in the post-war years, but wound down to quarterly publication before closing in 1922. When Claude McKay arrived in London in 1919 he had a letter of introduction to Ogden from Walter Fuller. He contacted Ogden in March 1920 and Ogden published his poetry in the Magazine.

=== Author, bookseller and editor ===
Ogden published four books during WWI. One was The Problem of the Continuation School (1914), with Robert Hall Best (1843–1925) of the Best & Lloyd lighting company of Handsworth, and concerned industrial training. He also translated a related work by Georg Kerschensteiner (1854–1932) who had introduced him to Best, which appeared as The Schools and the Nation (1914). Militarism versus Feminism (1915, anonymous) was co-written with Mary Sargant Florence mother of Alix. Uncontrolled Breeding, or, Fecundity versus Civilization (1916) was a tract in favour of birth control, published under his pseudonym Adelyne More.

Ogden ran two bookshops in Cambridge as well as a gallery where he sold works of art by members of the Bloomsbury Group. One of his bookshops was looted on the day the First World War ended.

Ogden built up a position as editor for Kegan Paul, publishers in London. In 1920, he was one of the founders of the psychological journal Psyche, and later took over the editorship; Psyche was initially the Psychic Research Quarterly set up by Walter Whately Smith, but changed its name and editorial policy in 1921. It appeared until 1952, and was a vehicle for some of Ogden's interests.

Also for Kegan Paul he founded and edited what became five separate series of books, comprising hundreds of titles. Two were major series of monographs, "The History of Civilization" and "The International Library of Psychology, Philosophy and Scientific Method"; the latter series included about 100 volumes after one decade. From its launch in 1924, he edited the "To-day and To-morrow" series, another extensive series running to about 150 volumes, of popular books in essay form with provocative titles. The first of the series after an intervention by Fredric Warburg was Daedalus; or, Science and the Future by J. B. S. Haldane, an extended version of a talk to the Heretics Society. Other series were "Science for You" and "Psyche Miniatures".

=== Language and philosophy ===
The semantic triangle

Ogden helped with the English translation of Wittgenstein's Tractatus Logico-Philosophicus. The translation itself was the work of F. P. Ramsey; Ogden as a commissioning editor assigned the task of translation to Ramsey, supposedly on earlier experience of Ramsey's insight into another German text, of Ernst Mach. Ogden adopted the Latinate title now given to the work in English, with its nod to Baruch Spinoza's Tractatus Theologico-Politicus, which is attributed to G. E. Moore.

Ogden's most durable written work is his monograph (with I. A. Richards) titled The Meaning of Meaning (1923), which went into many editions. This book straddled the boundaries among linguistics, literary analysis, and philosophy. It drew attention to the significs of Victoria Lady Welby of whom Ogden was a disciple and the semiotics of Charles Sanders Peirce. A major step in the "linguistic turn" of 20th century British philosophy, The Meaning of Meaning set out principles for understanding the function of language and described the so-called semantic triangle. It included the inimitable phrase "The gostak distims the doshes."

== Advocacy for Basic English ==
From 1925 until his death in 1957, the advocacy of Basic English became Ogden's primary activity. Basic English is an auxiliary international language of 850 words comprising a system that covers everything necessary for day-to-day purposes. These 850 words, together with its five combinatory rules, were designed to do the work of some 20,000 English words, which appealed to many of the leading communications philosophers and theorists of the time, including Otto Neurath and Willard C. Brinton. To promote Basic English, Ogden in 1927 founded the Orthological Institute, from orthology, the abstract term he proposed for its work (see orthoepeia). Its headquarters were on King's Parade in Cambridge. From 1928 to 1930 Ogden set out his developing ideas on Basic English and Jeremy Bentham in Psyche.

In 1929 the Orthological Institute published a recording by James Joyce of a passage from a draft of Finnegans Wake. In summer of that year Tales Told of Shem and Shaun had been published, an extract from the work as it then stood, and Ogden had been asked to supply an introduction. When Joyce was in London in August, Ogden approached him to do a reading for a recording. In 1932 Ogden published a translation of the Finnegans Wake passage into Basic English.

By 1943 the Institute had moved to Gordon Square in London.

Ogden was also a consultant with the International Auxiliary Language Association, which presented Interlingua in 1951. He furthermore was the editor for Kenneth Searight's book Sona.

== Personal life and death ==
Ogden died on 20 March 1957 in London, at a private clinic. He never married.

== Collections ==
Ogden collected a large number of books. His incunabula, manuscripts, papers of the Brougham family, and Jeremy Bentham collection were purchased by University College London in 1953 with the help of a grant from the Nuffield Foundation. His personal papers and the remaining 100,000 books in his collection were purchased after his death by the University of California - Los Angeles. University College London also holds the papers of Mark Haymon, Ogden's solicitor and collaborator.

== Legacy ==
Although neither a trained philosopher nor an academic, Ogden had a material effect on British academic philosophy. The Meaning of Meaning enunciated a theory of emotivism. Ogden went on to edit as Bentham's Theory of Fictions (1932) a work of Jeremy Bentham, and had already translated in 1911 as The Philosophy of 'As If' a work of Hans Vaihinger, both of which are regarded as precursors of the modern theory of fictionalism.

In 1973 Georg Henrik von Wright edited Wittgenstein's Letters to C.K. Ogden with Comments on the English Translation of the Tractatus Logico-Philosophicus, including correspondence with Ramsey.

== See also ==
- Simple English
- Universal language
