= Big lie =

Propaganda technique

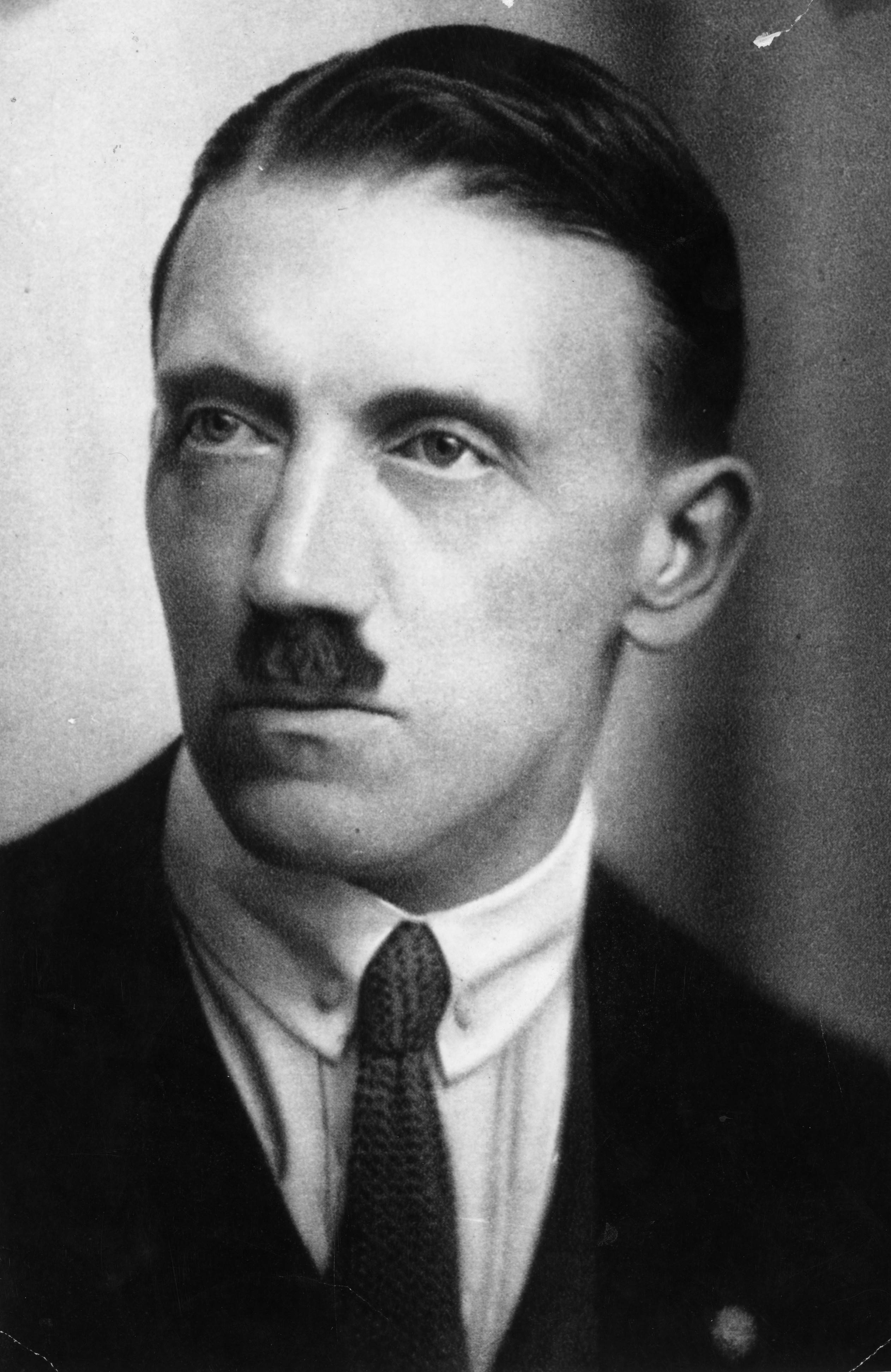
Adolf Hitler, c. 1923, two years before he coined the expression

A big lie (German: große Lüge) is a gross distortion or misrepresentation of the truth, primarily used as a political propaganda technique. The German expression was first used by Adolf Hitler in his book Mein Kampf (1925) to describe how people could be induced to believe "colossal untruths" because they would not believe that someone "could have the impudence to distort the truth so infamously". Hitler claimed that the technique had been used by Jews to blame Germany's loss in World War I on German general Erich Ludendorff, who was a prominent nationalist political leader in the Weimar Republic.

According to historian Jeffrey Herf, the Nazis used the idea of the original big lie to turn sentiment against Jews and justify the Holocaust. Herf maintains that Nazi Germany's chief propagandist Joseph Goebbels and the Nazi Party actually used the big lie technique that they described – and that they used it to turn long-standing antisemitism in Europe into mass murder. Herf further argues that the Nazis' big lie was their depiction of Germany as an innocent, besieged nation striking back at "international Jewry", which the Nazis blamed for starting World War I. Nazi propaganda repeatedly claimed that Jews held outsized and secret power in Britain, Russia, and the United States. It further spread claims that the Jews had begun a war of extermination against Germany, and used these to assert that Germany had a right to annihilate the Jews in self-defense.

In the 21st century, the term has been applied to Donald Trump's and his allies' attempts to overturn the result of the 2020 U.S. presidential election, specifically the false claim that the election was stolen through massive voter and electoral fraud. The scale of the claims resulted in Trump supporters attacking the United States Capitol. Later reports indicated that Trump knew he had genuinely lost the election, while promoting the narrative. Scholars say that constant repetition across many different forms of media is necessary for the success of the big lie technique, as is a psychological motivation for the public to believe the extreme assertions.

== Nazi Germany ==
=== Hitler's description ===
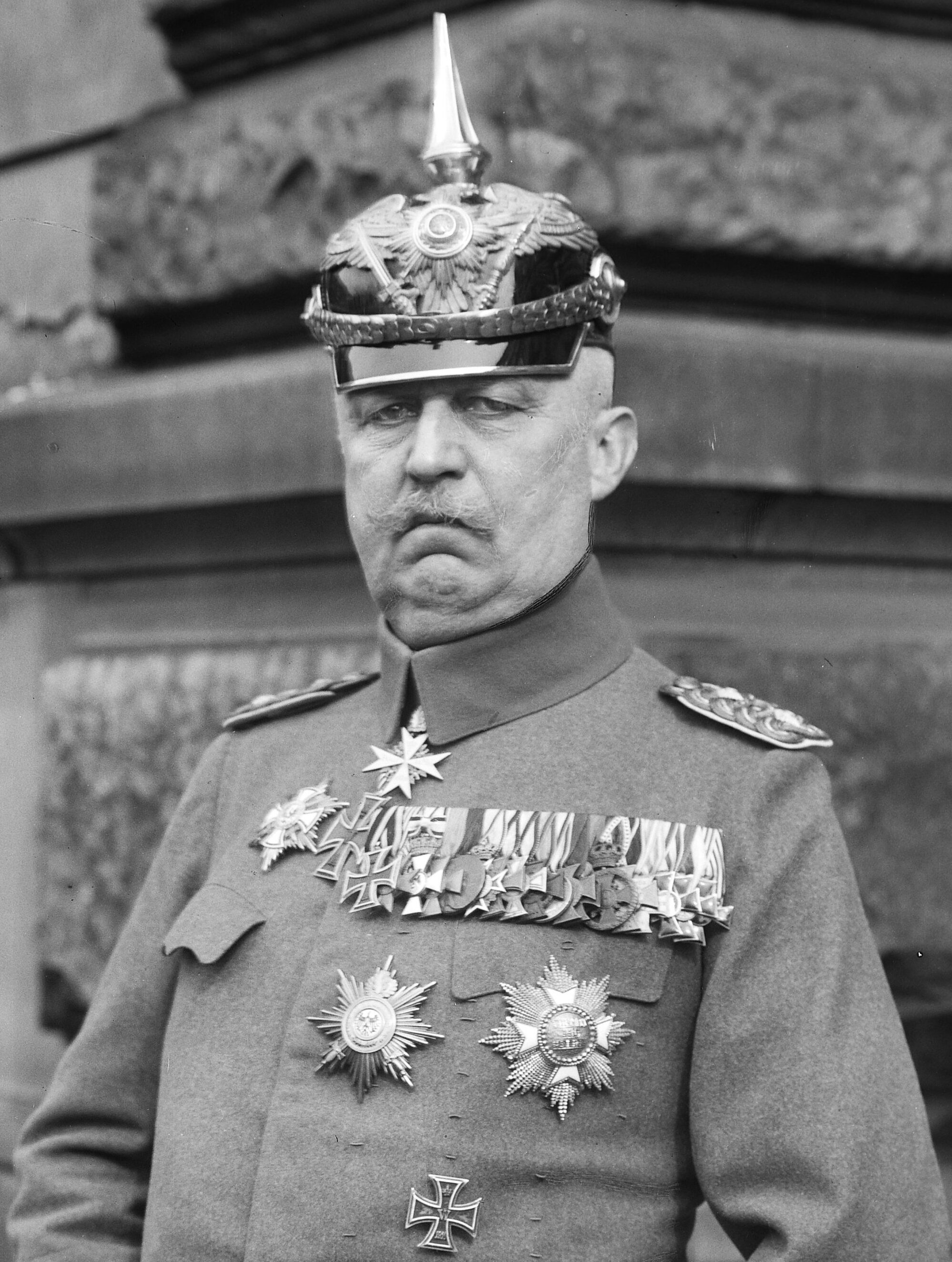
Hitler claimed that Jews had spread the "big lie" that General Erich Ludendorff (pictured) was responsible for the country's loss in World War I.

Hitler's definition is given in Chapter 10 of Adolf Hitler's Mein Kampf (part of a single paragraph in both the German original and James Murphy's translation):

But it remained for the Jews, with their unqualified capacity for falsehood, and their fighting comrades, the Marxists, to impute responsibility for the downfall precisely to the man who alone had shown a superhuman will and energy in his effort to prevent the catastrophe which he had foreseen and to save the nation from that hour of complete overthrow and shame. By placing responsibility for the loss of the world war on the shoulders of Ludendorff they took away the weapon of moral right from the only adversary dangerous enough to be likely to succeed in bringing the betrayers of the Fatherland to Justice.

All this was inspired by the principle – which is quite true within itself – that in the big lie there is always a certain force of credibility; because the broad masses of a nation are always more easily corrupted in the deeper strata of their emotional nature than consciously or voluntarily; and thus in the primitive simplicity of their minds they more readily fall victims to the big lie than the small lie, since they themselves often tell small lies in little matters but would be ashamed to resort to large-scale falsehoods.

It would never come into their heads to fabricate colossal untruths, and they would not believe others could have the impudence to distort the truth so infamously. Even though the facts which prove this to be so may be brought clearly to their minds, they will still doubt and waver and will continue to think there may be some other explanation. For the grossly impudent lie always leaves traces behind it, even after it has been nailed down, a fact which is known to all expert liars in this world and to all who conspire together in the art of lying.

— Adolf Hitler, Mein Kampf, vol. I, ch. X

In 1943, The New York Times journalist Edwin James asserted that Hitler's biggest lie was his revisionist claim that Germany was not defeated in war in 1918, but rather was betrayed by internal groups. This stab-in-the-back myth was spread by right-wing groups, including the Nazis.

=== In enacting the Holocaust ===
According to historian Jeffrey Herf, the Nazis used the idea of the original big lie to turn sentiment against Jews and justify the Holocaust. Herf maintains that Joseph Goebbels and the Nazi Party actually used the big lie technique that they described – and that they used it to turn long-standing antisemitism in Europe into mass murder. Herf further argues that the Nazis' big lie was their depiction of Germany as an innocent, besieged land striking back at international Jewry, which the Nazis blamed for starting World War I. Nazi propaganda repeatedly claimed that Jews held power behind the scenes in Britain, Russia, and the United States. It further spread claims that the Jews had begun a war of extermination against Germany, and used these to assert that Germany had a right to annihilate the Jews in self-defense.

The Cold War historian Zachary Jonathan Jacobson describes its use:

Adolf Hitler first defined the Big Lie as a deviant tool wielded by Viennese Jews to discredit the Germans' deportment in World War I. Yet, in tragically ironic fashion, it was Hitler and his Nazi regime that actually employed the mendacious strategy. In an effort to rewrite history and blame European Jews for Germany's defeat in World War I, Hitler and his propaganda minister accused them of profiting from the war, consorting with foreign powers and "war shirking" (avoiding conscription). Jews, Hitler contended, were the weak underbelly of the Weimer state that exposed the loyal and true German population to catastrophic collapse. To sell this narrative, Joseph Goebbels insisted "all effective propaganda must be limited to a very few points and must harp on these in slogans until the last member of the public understands."

In short, Nazi fascism hinged on creating one streamlined, overarching lie ... the Nazis built an ideology on a fiction, the notion that Germany's defeat in World War I could be avenged (and reversed) by purging the German population of those purportedly responsible: the Jews.

=== Goebbels's description ===
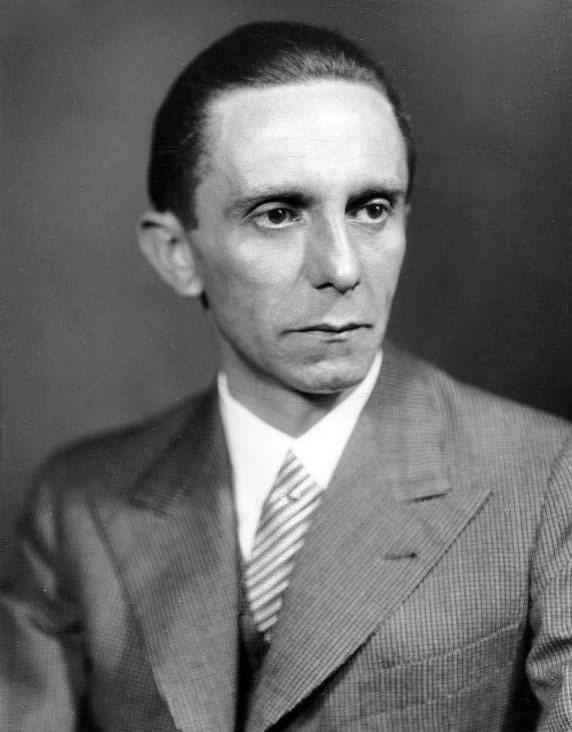
Joseph Goebbels, the head of Nazi Germany's Ministry of Propaganda

Joseph Goebbels also put forth a theory which has come to be commonly associated with the expression "big lie". Goebbels wrote the following paragraph in an article dated 12 January 1941, sixteen years after Hitler first used the phrase. The article, titled "Aus Churchills Lügenfabrik" (English: "From Churchill's Lie Factory") was published in Die Zeit ohne Beispiel:

The essential English leadership secret does not depend on particular intelligence. Rather, it depends on a remarkably stupid thick-headedness. The English follow the principle that when one lies, one should lie big, and stick to it. They keep up their lies, even at the risk of looking ridiculous.

==== Alleged quotation ====
The following supposed quotation of Joseph Goebbels has been repeated in numerous books and articles and on thousands of web pages, yet none of them has cited a primary source. According to the research and reasoning of Randall Bytwerk, it is an unlikely thing for Goebbels to have said:

If you tell a lie big enough and keep repeating it, people will eventually come to believe it. The lie can be maintained only for such time as the State can shield the people from the political, economic and/or military consequences of the lie. It thus becomes vitally important for the State to use all of its powers to repress dissent, for the truth is the mortal enemy of the lie, and thus by extension, the truth is the greatest enemy of the State.

=== U.S. psychological profile of Hitler ===
The phrase "big lie" was used in a report prepared around 1943 by Walter C. Langer for the United States Office of Strategic Services in describing Hitler's psychological profile. The report was later published in book form as The Mind of Adolf Hitler in 1972. Langer stated of the dictator:

His primary rules were: never allow the public to cool off; never admit a fault or wrong; never concede that there may be some good in your enemy; never leave room for alternatives; never accept blame; concentrate on one enemy at a time and blame him for everything that goes wrong; people will believe a big lie sooner than a little one; and if you repeat it frequently enough people will sooner or later believe it.

A somewhat similar quote appears in the 1943 Analysis of the Personality of Adolph Hitler: With Predictions of His Future Behaviour and Suggestions for Dealing with Him Now and After Germany's Surrender, by Henry A. Murray:

... never to admit a fault or wrong; never to accept blame; concentrate on one enemy at a time; blame that enemy for everything that goes wrong; take advantage of every opportunity to raise a political whirlwind.

=== Hitler's death ===
A 1947 U.S. book on the death of Adolf Hitler describes the infectious Soviet disinformation concerning his purported survival as an example of the technique, nodding to German philosopher Hans Vaihinger's 1911 book The Philosophy of 'As if', which ponders the acceptance of lies for utilitarian purposes. The U.S. book asserts that Soviet leadership, "realizing that Communist totalitarian systems and secret police methods require a continuing menace as justification for their existence, decided to keep the ghost of Hitler alive ... as a means of dramatizing the continuing menace of Fascism", bolstering their military.

In his controversial 1968 book, Soviet historian Lev Bezymenski cites the initial announcement of Hitler's death by Nazi Germany as an example of the big lie, as it claimed him to have died while acting as a soldier in the line of duty.

== United States ==
=== Cold War ===
A 1964 Senate Internal Security Subcommittee report on The Protocols of the Elders of Zion, a fabricated antisemitic text first published in Russia in 1903, stated that continued circulation of the Protocols could be attributed in part to utilization of "the Hitler technique of the 'big lie'".

=== By Republicans ===
The term has been used by prominent American right-wing figures to describe allegations that Trump's victory in the 2016 elections was the result of collusion between his campaign and Russia. Former Attorney General William Barr described those allegations as "a very damaging, big lie" that inhibited the administration's ability to properly deal with Vladimir Putin, a sentiment also echoed by Former House Speaker Newt Gingrich.

By early 2021, Trump and several prominent Republicans started to use the term "the big lie", claiming that it refers to other electoral issues. Trump stated that the term refers to the "Fraudulent Presidential Election of 2020". An opinion piece in the typically center-right Wall Street Journal, as well as Republican politicians Mitch McConnell and Newt Gingrich, referred to "the big lie" as Democratic opposition to what were new and more restrictive voter identification requirements. McConnell's office referred to a Democratic attempt to abolish the filibuster to enact voting rights legislation as "the left's Big Lie [that] there is some evil anti-voting conspiracy sweeping America". Timothy Snyder describes attempts to invert the narrative:

The lie is so big that it reorders the world. And so part of telling the big lie is that you immediately say it's the other side that tells the big lie. Sadly, but it's just a matter of record, all of that is in Mein Kampf.

By January 2022, Republicans were taking actions to impose new voting restrictions and to take complete control of voting and the administrative management of elections, all while a large majority of Republicans continued to believe that the 2020 election had been stolen from them and asserted that democracy was at risk of failing. Extensive press coverage indicated the Republican efforts themselves appeared to present a threat to democracy.

=== 2020 stolen election claims ===
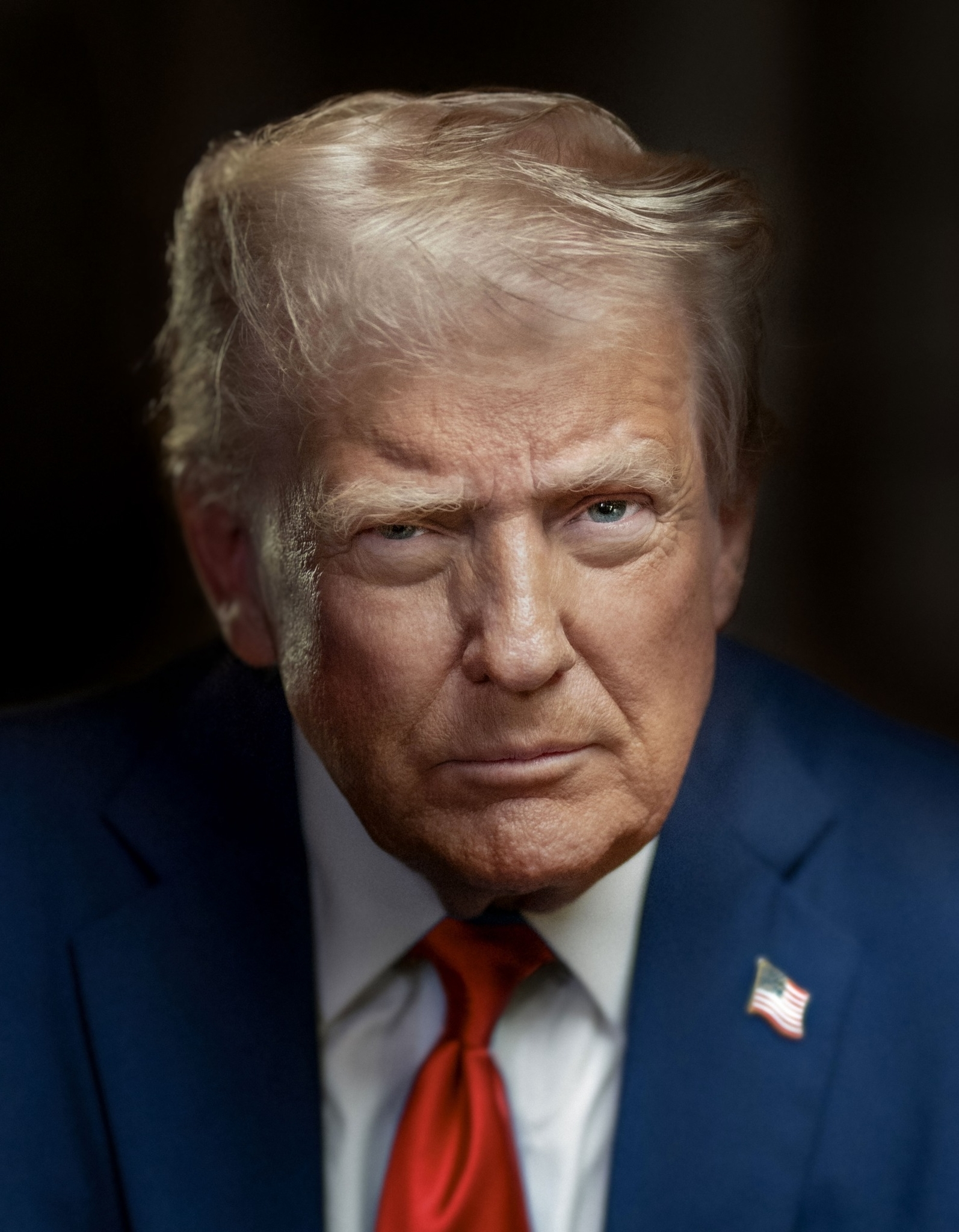
Donald Trump

According to CNN fact checker Daniel Dale, as of June 9, 2021, former president Donald Trump had issued 132 written statements since leaving office, of which "a third have included lies about the election" – more than any other subject.

To sow election doubt, Trump escalated use of "rigged election" and "election interference" statements in advance of the 2024 election compared to the previous two elections—the statements described as part of a "heads I win; tails you cheated" rhetorical strategy.

Through early October 2026, Trump had attacked the integrity of US elections on more than 70% of the days following his 2025 inauguration, repeatedly making false claims.

During his political career, U.S. president Donald Trump has employed what have been characterized as the firehose of falsehood and big lie propaganda techniques. To support his attempts to overturn the 2020 U.S. presidential election, he and his allies repeatedly and falsely claimed that there had been massive election fraud and that Trump was the true winner of the election. By 2023, major news outlets characterized Trump's claims as not merely falsehoods, but as lies.

U.S. Senators Josh Hawley of Missouri and Ted Cruz of Texas subsequently contested the election results in the Senate. Their effort was characterized as "the big lie" by then President-elect Joe Biden: "I think the American public has a real good, clear look at who they are. They're part of the big lie, the big lie." Republican senators Mitt Romney of Utah and Pat Toomey of Pennsylvania, scholars of fascism Timothy Snyder and Ruth Ben-Ghiat, Russian affairs expert Fiona Hill, and others also used the term "big lie" to refer to Trump's false claims about massive election fraud. By May 2021, many Republicans had come to embrace the false claim and use it as justification to impose new voting restrictions and attempt to take control of the administrative management of elections. Republicans who opposed the claims faced backlash.

In early 2021, The New York Times examined Trump's promotion of "the big lie" for political purposes to subvert the 2020 election, and concluded that the lie encouraged the 2021 attack on the U.S. Capitol. The attack was cited in a resolution to impeach Trump for a second time. During Trump's second impeachment trial, the house managers Jamie Raskin, Joe Neguse, Joaquin Castro, Stacey Plaskett and Madeleine Dean discussed how Trump used "the big lie" to repeatedly make the false claim the election was stolen from him. On October 7, a Senate Judiciary Committee report said that Trump attempted to use the Department of Justice to "lay the foundation of the 'Big Lie'" before the general election and remain in power regardless of election results.

In early 2022, The New York Times presented a detailed analysis of the continuing efforts by Trump and his allies to further promote "the big lie" and related lies in their attempts to overturn and influence future elections, including those in 2022 and 2024. On June 13, 2022, the U.S. House Select Committee on the January 6 Attack presented testimony that Trump knew he lost the 2020 election, but nevertheless promoted the false claim to exploit donors, and, as a result, raked in "half a billion" dollars. In the days following his first indictment on March 30, 2023, he repeatedly posted similar election-related commentary to social media.

Dominion Voting Systems, which provided voting machines to many jurisdictions in the 2020 U.S. elections, filed four major lawsuits related to the big lie that Dominion fixed the election. From Trump's lawyer Rudy Giuliani, Dominion seeks $1.3 billion in damages, alleging that "he and his allies manufactured and disseminated the 'Big Lie', which foreseeably went viral and deceived millions of people into believing that Dominion had stolen their votes and fixed the election." Separately, in Dominion Voting Systems v. Fox News Network it sought $1.6 billion from Fox News. During discovery, Fox News' internal communications were released, indicating that prominent hosts and top executives were aware the network was reporting false statements but continued doing so to retain viewers for financial reasons. On April 18, 2023, Fox News agreed to pay Dominion a $788 million settlement, described by CNN as the "big price" of telling "the Big Lie". Dominion is also suing two other TV networks, Newsmax and One America News Network, for $1.6 billion each, as well as My Pillow and its CEO Mike Lindell for $1.2 billion.

On April 25, 2023, CNN reported that Trump had told a new lie about the 2020 election: "Trump pointedly noted that Biden got more votes than Trump in fewer than a fifth of US counties in 2020. Trump then said, 'Nothing like this has ever happened before. Usually, it's very equal, or – but the winner always had the most counties.'" The statement was described as "complete bunk". Both Bill Clinton (1992 and 1996) and Barack Obama (2008 and 2012) carried "a minority of counties in each of their victories". William H. Frey, a senior fellow at the Brookings Institution, explained:

There is nothing suspicious about winning the presidency with a smaller number of counties. Counties vary widely in size, with large urban and suburban counties – areas where Biden did best – housing far larger populations than most of the outer suburb, small town and rural counties that Trump won.

Trump v. Cable News Network, Inc.
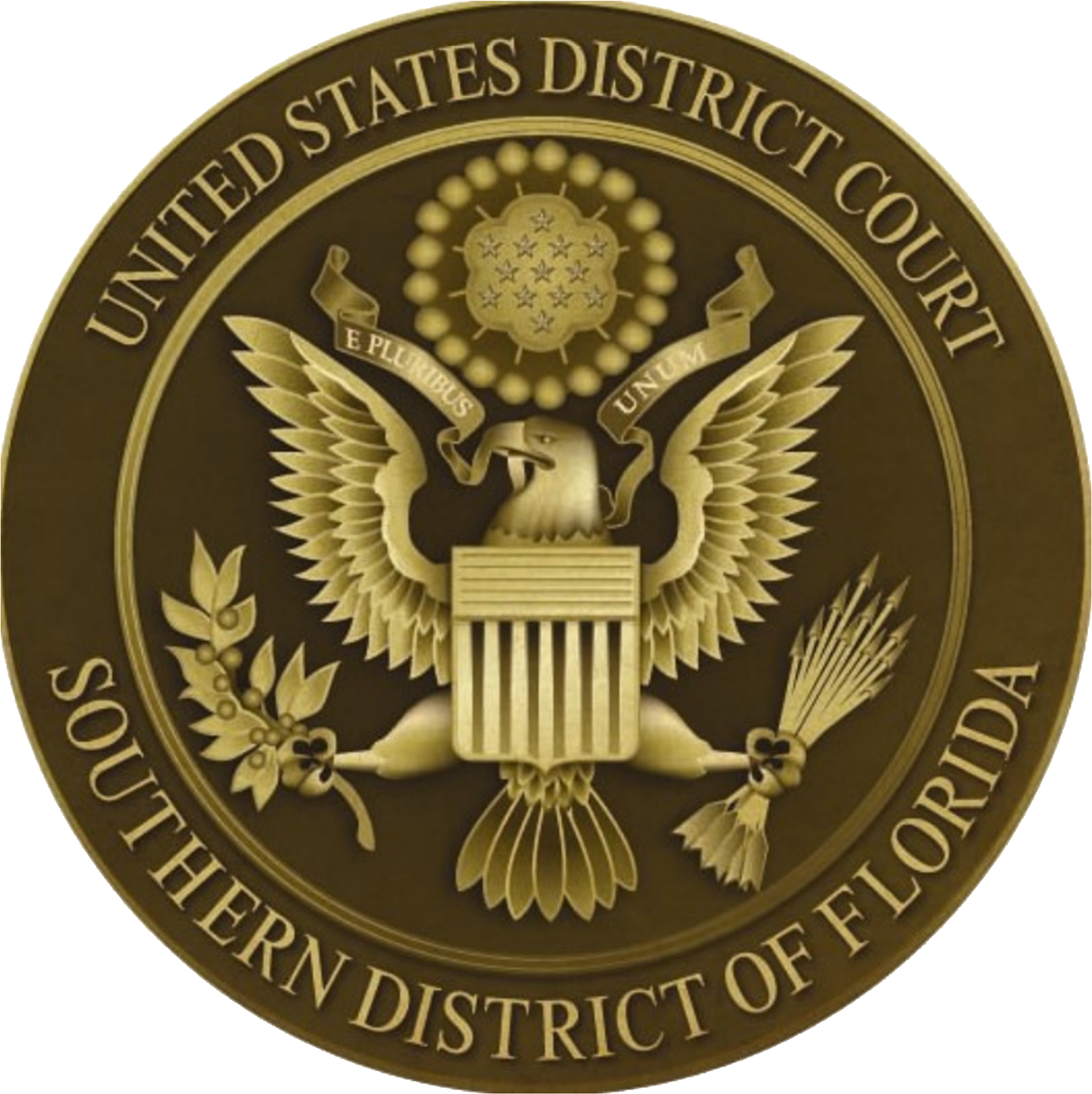
- Court: Southern District of Florida
- Started: October 3, 2022; 4 years ago
- Docket nos.: 0:22-cv-61842 (S.D. Fla.); 23-14044 (11th Cir.)

Case history
- Appealed to: United States Court of Appeals for the Eleventh Circuit

Outcome
- Dismissed on July 28, 2023; 3 years ago by district court. Dismissal affirmed by Eleventh Circuit in November 2025

Court membership
- Judge sitting: Raag Singhal

On July 28, 2023, a federal district court judge dismissed an October 2022 Trump lawsuit against CNN, stating that CNN's multiple uses of the term "big lie" about Trump's claims of election fraud did not constitute actionable defamation. The judge wrote that CNN's statements were opinion, not factually verifiable statements, and that "no reasonable viewer" would infer that "Trump advocates the persecution and genocide of Jews or any other group of people". The suit was dismissed with prejudice, meaning Trump could not sue again on the same basis.

On December 13, 2024, just over a month after the 2024 United States presidential election, the Public Religion Research Institute published the results of a survey conducted shortly after that election, between November 8 and December 2. The survey focused primarily on the 2024 election but included questions about the claim that the 2020 election was stolen from Trump: 63 percent of Republicans and 31 percent of voters overall still agreed that the 2020 election had been stolen from Trump.

In 2025, research published in Episteme found Trump's use of the "big lie" to support his false stolen election claims as exhibiting multiple rhetoric strategies employed by demagogues. Namely by utilizing a "crisis narrative" and a pervasive sense of grievance, victimization, and persecution. It highlighted that even if supporters did not fully believe the claims, such claims "felt" true, and were left with enough "interpretive openness" that would allow supporters to fill in the gaps. Thus, "they find it an accurate reflection of their own experiences toward a related content, irrespective of evidential support".

== China ==
The Government of China has denied committing human rights abuses against Uyghurs in Xinjiang, and has labelled declarations of Uyghur genocide as a "big lie" perpetrated by hostile forces.

== See also ==
- Brainwashing
- Brandolini's law
- Demagogue
- Fake news
- Gaslighting
- Illusory truth effect
- Noble lie
- Post-truth politics
- Propaganda
