= Tornoceratoidea =

Tornoceratoidea Temporal range: 391.9–360.7 Ma

Scientific classification
- Domain: Eukaryota
- Kingdom: Animalia
- Phylum: Mollusca
- Class: Cephalopoda
- Subclass: †Ammonoidea
- Order: †Goniatitida
- Suborder: †Tornoceratina
- Superfamily: †Tornoceratoidea; Arthaber, 1911

Families
- Kirsoceratidae; Parodoceratidae; Posttornoceratidae; Pseudoclymeniidae; Tornoceratidae

Extinct superfamily of molluscs

Tornoceratoidea, also known as Tornocerataceae, is a superfamily of goniatitid ammonoids included in the suborder Tornoceratina. Tornoceratoidea, or Tornocerataceae, is essentially the Cheilocerataceae of Miller, Furnish, and Schindewolf (1957) in the Treatise Part L, revised to accommodate new taxa and new perspectives on the phylogeny.

== Taxonomy ==
Tornoceratoid genera are divided among five families, Tornoceratidae, Parodoceratidae, Posttornoceratidae, Pseudoclymediidae, and Kirsoceratidae, some of which have been recently established.

Tornoceratidae, essentially the Tornoceratidae of the Treatise, Part L, 1957, included in the Cheilocerataceae is split as a result of new discoveries into three subfamilies, the Tornnoceratinae, Aulatornoceratinae and Falcitornoceratinae, of which the Tornoceratinae is the oldest.

Parodoceratidae, proposed by Petter in 1959 is based on the genus Parodoceras, which along with Wedekindella, was placed originally in the 'Anarcestidae'. Parodiceras was described by Wedekind in 1913, Wededkindella by Schindewolf in 1928. The other two genera, Croyites and Trevoneites were added, respectively by Korn in 2001 and by Becker and House in 1994.

Posttornoceratidae is a small family of tornoceratoids, split into two subfamilies the Posttornoceratinae and Discoclymeniinae, based on Posttornoceras and Discoclymenia. The family was originally included in the Tornoceratidae by Miller et al.

Pseudoclymeniidae is a family of tornoceroids containing a single genus, Pseudoclymenia, named by Frech in 1897 and split off from the Tornoceratidae of Miller et al. by Becker in 1993. Both the genus, and family were assigned to the Tornoceratoidea by Korn in 2006.

Kirsoceratidae, named by Korn in 2002 and assigned to the Tornoceratoidea in 2006, is based on Kirsoceras described by Bogoslovsky in 1971.
