= Udaltsov =

Udaltsov is a Russian surname. Notable people with the surname include:

- Alexander Udaltsov (historian) (1883–1958), Bolshevik historian
- Anastasia Udaltsova (born 1978), Russian politician
- Sergei Udaltsov (born 1977), Russian political activist
