= Rignano =

Rignano may refer to:

== Places in Italy ==
- Rignano Flaminio, a municipality in the province of Rome, Lazio
- Rignano Garganico, a municipality in the province of Foggia, Apulia
- Rignano sull'Arno, a municipality in the province of Florence, Tuscany

== People with the surname ==
- Eugenio Rignano (1870–1930), Italian philosopher

== Other uses ==
- Battle of Rignano, an 1137 battle involving Normans and the Kingdom of Sicily near Rignano Garganico

== See also ==
- Orignano, a civil parish of Baronissi (SA), Campania
