= R. J. Zwi Werblowsky =

R.J. Zwi Werblowsky
- רפאל יהודה צבי ורבלובסקי
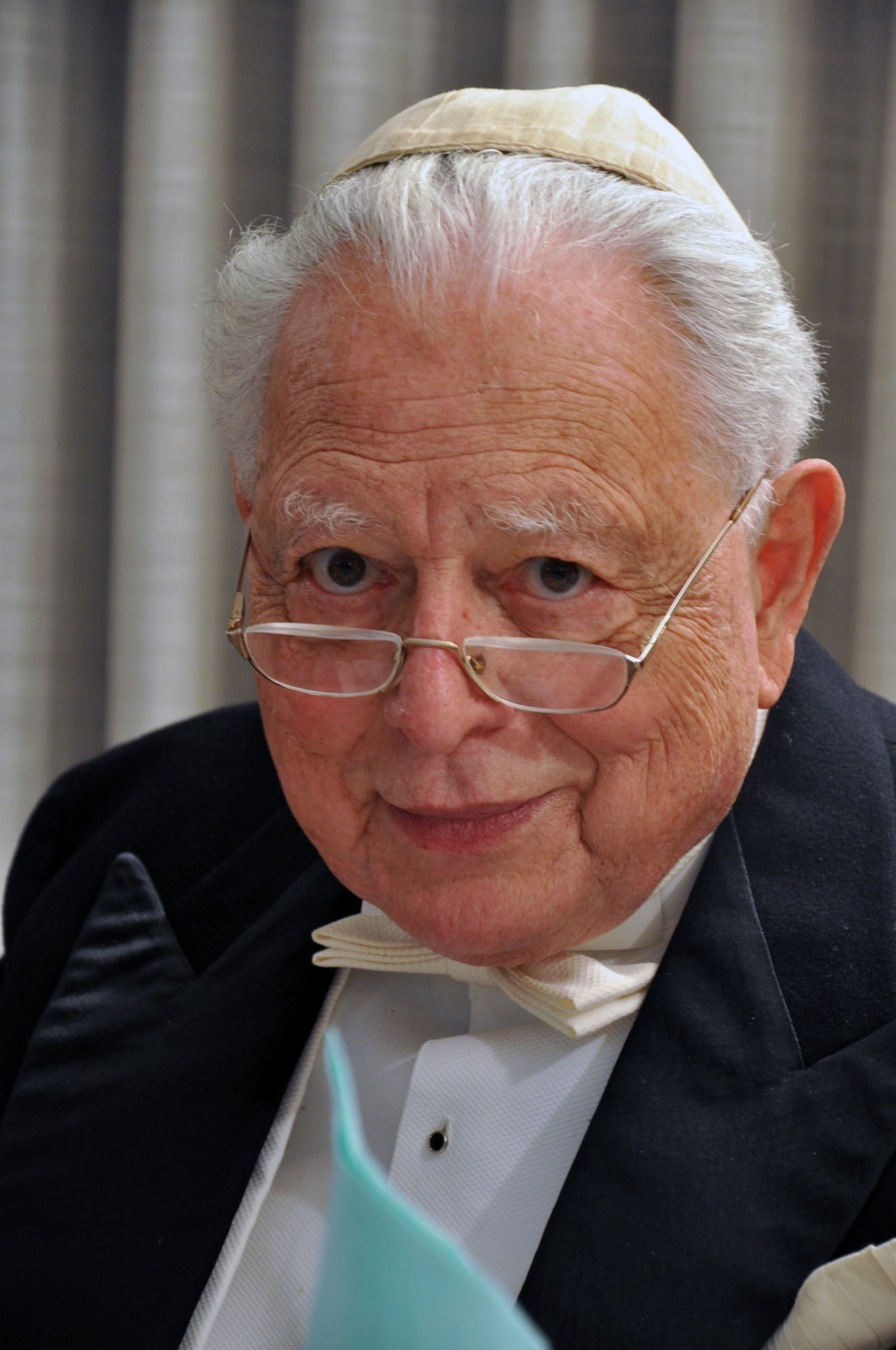
- Born: January 3, 1924; Frankfurt, Germany
- Died: July 9, 2015 (aged 90–91); Jerusalem, Israel
- Citizenship: Israel
- Education: PhD
- Alma mater: University of London; University of Geneva
- Awards: The EMET Prize (2005); Order of the Rising Sun (2009)
- Scientific career
- Fields: comparative religion interfaith dialogue
- Institutions: Hebrew University of Jerusalem; Numen
- Thesis: (1951)

Raphael Judah (R.J.) Zwi Werblowsky (Hebrew: רפאל יהודה צבי ורבלובסקי; January 3, 1924, Frankfurt — July 9, 2015, Jerusalem) was an Israeli scholar of religion specializing in comparative religion and interfaith dialogue. Werblowsky served as Dean of the Faculty of Humanities at the Hebrew University of Jerusalem between 1965—1969, Secretary-General and later Vice-President of the International Association for the History of Religions, Vice-President of the International Council for Philosophy and the Humanities of UNESCO and the chief editor of the journal Numen. He also co-edited The Encyclopedia of the Jewish Religion. In 2005 R.J. Zwi Werblowsky became a recipient of The EMET Prize for Art, Science and Culture, and in 2009 he was awarded Order of the Rising Sun, Gold Rays with Neck Ribbon by the government of Japan.

== Biography ==
Raphael Judah Zwi Werblowsky was born in 1924 in Frankfurt. Toward the end of the 1930s he immigrated to Mandatory Palestine and studied at several Yeshivas there (including world-famous Ponevezh Yeshiva). He proceeded with his studies at the University of London and completed his bachelor's degree there in 1945. Following the end of World War II Werblowsky worked at an orphanage in the Netherlands which prepared Jewish children who survived the Holocaust for immigration to Palestine and later State of Israel. In 1951, he received his PhD from the University of Geneva. In 1952 he published his first book, Lucifer and Prometheus, which had an introduction written by Carl Jung.

After receiving his doctoral degree Werblowsky for five years was teaching in England (Manchester and Leeds) before returning to Israel in 1956. There he was among the founders of the Department of Comparative Religion at the Hebrew University in Jerusalem. He stayed with this institution till his retirement in 1980. Between 1965—1969 Werblowsky served as the Dean of the Faculty of Humanities at the Hebrew University of Jerusalem. He was also teaching as a visiting professor in many universities around the world.

In 1958 R.J. Zwi Werblowsky founded the Israel Inter-Faith Committee in Jerusalem and later founded the Jerusalem Rainbow Club which served as the place for contacts and discussions between Jewish, Muslim and Christian intellectuals. Between 1975—1985 Werblowski served as Secretary-General of the International Association for the History of Religions (IAHR), where he later assumed the position of Vice-President. Between 1984—1988 he was serving as Vice-President of the International Council for Philosophy and the Humanities of UNESCO. Werblowsky was also for many years editing Numen, one of the leading journals in the field of comparative religion and was a coeditor of The Encyclopedia of the Jewish Religion.

In 2005 Zwi Werblowsky was awarded The EMET Prize for Art, Science and Culture for his contribution to the study of the religion in various cultures in Israel and for his role in promoting interfaith dialogue and the encouragement of religious tolerance in Israel and abroad. In 2009 he was awarded Order of the Rising Sun, Gold Rays with Neck Ribbon for his contributions to the development of Japan studies in Israel and promotion of academic contacts between Japan and Israel. He died in July 2015.
