= Ernest MacBride =

British Irish marine biologist (1866–1940)

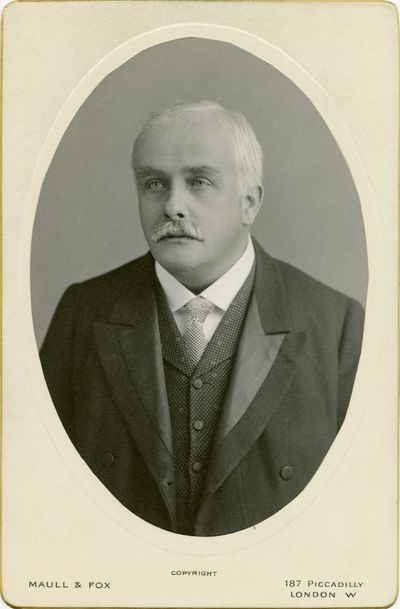
- Ernest MacBride, before 1928
- Born: 12 December 1866; Belfast
- Died: 17 November 1940 (aged 73); Alton, Hampshire
- Education: Queen's College, Belfast; University of Cambridge
- Spouse: Constance Harvey Chrysler
- Scientific career
- Institutions: McGill University; Imperial College London
- Doctoral students: Lancelot Hogben; F.G. Walton Smith

Ernest William MacBride FRS (12 December 1866, in Belfast – 17 November 1940, in Alton, Hampshire) was a British Irish marine biologist, one of the last supporters of Lamarckian evolution.

== Life ==
MacBride was the eldest of the five children of Minnie Browne of Donegal and Samuel MacBride, a linen manufacturer in Belfast. MacBride was educated at the Academic Institute of Belfast. He then spent a year in Neuwied on the Rhine before returning to continue his education at Queen's College, Belfast, as an external student at London University and at St John's College, Cambridge as an exhibitioner, where he became a Foundation Scholar in 1891 and Fellow in 1893. He spent a year at the Zoological Station in Naples in 1891/92 engaged in research under Anton Dohrn. Returning to Cambridge, he became a University Demonstrator in Animal Morphology and a Fellow of St John's in 1893. In 1893 he was awarded the Walsingham Medal for Biological Research.

In 1897 he was elected as the first Strathcona Professor of Zoology at McGill University. In Canada he married Constance Harvey Chrysler, daughter of Francis Henry Chrysler K.C. He was elected as a Fellow of the Royal Society in 1905 for his work on echinoderm morphology. In 1909 he resigned and returned to the United Kingdom. From 1909 to 1913 he was assistant professor of Zoology under Adam Sedgwick at Imperial College London. On Sedgwick's death in 1913, MacBride became professor at Imperial, holding the chair until his retirement in 1934.

A defender of Lamarckian evolution, MacBride's specialism was the morphology and embryology of the Echinoderms. MacBride supported Paul Kammerer’s claims to have demonstrated Lamarckian inheritance in the Midwife toad. MacBride held racialist ideas. Science historian Peter J. Bowler has written that MacBride was "convinced that the races could be ranked in a hierarchy with whites at the top, MacBride adopted an environmentalist explanation of how the racial differences were produced." He rejected the concept of the gene and the mutation theory of evolution.

MacBride took an active part both in the affairs of the Linnean Society which he served as a member of its council and as vice-president and the Zoological Society where he also served on the council for over thirty years and acted as vice-president.

== Works ==
- Text-book of embryology. Vol. I: Invertebrates, London: Macmillan, 1914
- (with A. E. Shipley) Zoology; an elementary text-book, Cambridge: University Press, 1915.
- An introduction to the study of heredity, New York: H. Holt & Co., 1924.
- (tr.) Biological memory by Eugenio Rignano. London: K. Paul, Trench, Trubner & Co.; New York: Harcourt, Brace & Co., 1926. The International Library of Psychology, Philosophy and Scientific Method
- Evolution, London: Ernest Benn, [1927]
- The idea of memory in biology, 1928
- (with H. R. Hewer) ‘Zoology’, in Alfred Piney, ed., Recent advances in microscopy; biological applications, 1931
- ‘The oneness and uniqueness of life’, in Frances Baker Mason, The great design; order and progress in nature, New York: Macmillan Co., 1934
- Huxley, London: Duckworth, [1934].
