= Bruno Petermann =

Bruno Max Wilhelm Petermann (1898-1941) was a German psychology professor who published one of the early textbooks on Gestalt theory.

== Life ==
Petermann was born on 15 March 1898 in Kiel. He took a doctorate in the University of Kiel in 1921. He taught in Dortmund, Kiel and Altona and then became a professor at the Hamburg teacher training college from 1936 to 1939. Whilst at Hamburg Petermann spent time teaching in Shanghai.

Petermann became a member of the Nazi party in 1937 and in 1939 was made Professor of Psychology and Education in the University of Göttingen.

Petermann died on 11 February 1941 in Hamburg.

== Works ==
- Das Gestaltproblem in der Psychologie im Lichte analytischer Besinnung, 1931. Barth, Leipzig. Translated into English as:
- The Gestalt Theory and the Problem of Configuration,1932. Translated by Meyer Fortes. The International Library of Psychology, Philosophy, and Scientific Method. Kegan Paul, London.
- Trigonometry, 1938. Diesterweg, Frankfurt.

== Biography ==
- Deutsches biographisches Archiv II 994, 444; III 696, 187.
