= Ring theory (disambiguation) =

Ring theory is a branch of algebra.

Ring theory can also refer to:

- Ring theory (psychology), a theory in psychology
- Chiastic structure, a literary technique
