= Posttornoceratidae =

Scientific classification
- Domain: Eukaryota
- Kingdom: Animalia
- Phylum: Mollusca
- Class: Cephalopoda
- Subclass: †Ammonoidea
- Order: †Goniatitida
- Superfamily: †Tornoceratoidea
- Family: †Posttornoceratidae; Bogoslovsky 1962

Subfamilies
- Discoclymeniinae; Posttornoceratinae

Extinct family of molluscs

The Posttornoceratidae are Late Devonian goniatites (Ammonoidea) included in the superfamily Tornoceratoidea. The family, Posttornoceratidae, named by Bogoslovsky in 1962, is based on the genus Posttornoceras, named by Wedekind in 1910, originally included in the Tornoceratidae (sensu Miller et al. 1964).

The Posttornoceratidae produced subglobular to discoidal shells with small, closed umbilici and lateral lobes in the suture that are produced adventitiously (i.e. haphazardly) from the first lateral saddles.

== Evolution and taxonomy ==
=== Derivation ===
The Posttornoceratidae are derived from the Falcitornoceratidae through Exotornocers (Saunders et al. 2004)

=== Taxonomic divisions ===
==== Subfamilies ====
The family has been split into two subfamilies each containing two genera. Slightly older are the lower to middle Famennian Posttornoceratinae, followed by the later Famennian Discoclymeniinae. The Posttornoceratinae contains Exotornocers and Posttornoceras, the Discoclymeniinae, Discoclymenia and Alpinites.

==== Genera ====
Posttornoceras, type genus of the Posttornoceratinae was named by Wedekind in 1910. Posttornocerashas a subglobular to discoidal shell with a small, closed umbilicus and biconvex growth lines (Miller et al. 1964). Sutural lobes next to the ventral lobe are formed adventitiously in the first latera saddles. Posttornoceras is derived from Exotornoceras (Saunders et al. 2004) and has been found in Upper Devonian sediments in Germany and Poland (Miller et al. ibid)

Exotornoceras is the ancestral tornoceratid, named by Becker in 1993. Exotornoceras is derived from Gundolficeras( Falcitornoceratinae)

Discoclymenia is the type of the Discoclylemniinae, named by Hyatt in 1844. Discoclymenia has a subglobular to discoidal shell with a small, closed umbilicus, like Sporadoceras but with additional adventitious lobes in the 1st lateral saddles. Discoclymenia" and "Sporadoceras are included in the subfamily Sporadoceratinae of Miller and Furnish (1964) along with Praeglyphioceras according to Miller et at (1964) . Discoclymenia comes from the Upper Devonian of Europe and North Africa.

Alpinites was named by Bogolsovsky in 1971 and is derived from Discoclymenia (Saunders et al. 2004).
