= Ring psychology =

Ring psychology may refer to...

- Ring theory in the field of psychology.
- Ring psychology, a term used in the context of professional wrestling.
