= Alpinites =

Scientific classification
- Domain: Eukaryota
- Kingdom: Animalia
- Phylum: Mollusca
- Class: Cephalopoda
- Subclass: †Ammonoidea
- Order: †Goniatitida
- Family: †Posttornoceratidae
- Subfamily: †Discoclymeniinae
- Genus: †Alpinites; Bogoslovsky 1971

Genus of molluscs (fossil)

Alpinites is a genus belonging to the Discoclymeniinae subfamily, a member of the Goniatitida order. They are an extinct group of ammonoid, which are shelled cephalopods related to squids, belemnites, octopuses, and cuttlefish, and more distantly to the nautiloids.
