= Numen (journal) =

Bimonthly peer-reviewed academic journal

Numen: International Review for the History of Religions
- Discipline: History of religions
- Language: English
- Edited by: Laura Feldt

Publication details
- History: 1954–present
- Publisher: Brill Publishers
- Frequency: Bimonthly

Standard abbreviations
- ISO 4: Numen

Indexing
- ISSN: 0029-5973 (print); 1568-5276 (web)
- LCCN: 58046229
- JSTOR: 00295973
- OCLC no.: 50557232

Links
- Journal homepage; Online archive

Numen: International Review for the History of Religions is a bimonthly peer-reviewed academic journal covering the history of religions of any regions and times. It was established in 1954 and is published by Brill Publishers on behalf of the International Association for the History of Religions. The editors-in-chief are Laura Feldt (University of Southern Denmark), and Ülo Valk (University of Tartu).

== Abstracting and indexing ==
The journal is abstracted and indexed in:

- Arts & Humanities Citation Index
- Bibliography of Asian Studies
- Bibliography of the History of Art
- Current Contents/Arts & Humanities
- Index Islamicus
- International Bibliography of the Social Sciences
- MLA International Bibliography
- New Testament Abstracts
- Religious & Theological Abstracts
- Scopus
- VINITI Database RAS

According to Scopus, it has a 2018 SCImago Journal Rank of 0.232, ranking in the first quartile of both the 'History' and 'Religious Studies' categories.
