= Nina Rignano =

Italian philanthropist

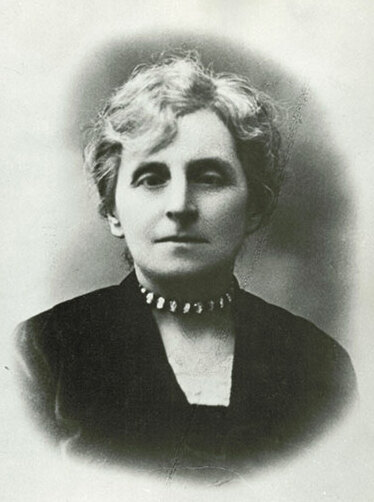
- Born: Constanza Sullam; 4 July 1871; Milan
- Died: 26 May 1945 (aged 73); Varese
- Occupation: philanthropist
- Known for: in the early Italian Women’s Movement
- Spouse: Eugenio Rignano

Constanza "Nina" Rignano (née Sullam; 1871 – 1945) was an Italian philanthropist active from the 1830s until 1930s.

== Biography ==
Rignano was born Constanza Sullam to wealthy Jewish parents in Milan, Italy and she received what was described as a modern education. She married Eugenio Rignano, a philosopher from Livorno who was also Jewish, in 1897.

== Career ==
Milanese Jews contributed large sums to women's education and vocational training but her interests had a more political tone, helping found the Unione femminile in 1899.

With her husband, Rignano contributed to the Societa Umanitaria and Universita Popolare. Alone she worked for women's education.

In 1901, Rignano wrote the bylaws for the Committee Against White Slavery.

She was discriminated against because she was Jewish. She was forced to resign from directorships and in May 1944 all of her assets were taken by law. She died in 1945.

== See also ==
- Salerno S. Il contributo femminile alla medicina del lavoro di fine ottocento [The women's contribution to occupational health at the end of the nineteenth century]. G Ital Med Lav Ergon. 2011 Jul-Sep;33(3 Suppl):460-4. Italian. PMID 23393899.
