= Pseudoclymeniidae =

Scientific classification
- Domain: Eukaryota
- Kingdom: Animalia
- Phylum: Mollusca
- Class: Cephalopoda
- Subclass: †Ammonoidea
- Order: †Goniatitida
- Superfamily: †Tornoceratoidea
- Family: †Pseudoclymeniidae; Becker 1993

Genus
- Pseudoclymenia

Extinct family of molluscs

Pseudoclymeniidae is one of five families of the Tornoceratoidea superfamily, a member of the Goniatitida order. They are an extinct group of ammonoid, which are shelled cephalopods related to squids, belemnites, octopuses, and cuttlefish, and more distantly to the nautiloids.
