= Marian Gertrude Beard =

Irish-born educator, translator and headmistress

Marian Gertrude Beard, known to friends as 'Barbula' Beard (1885-1958) was an Irish-born educator and translator, headmistress of Putney High School and Crofton Grange School.

== Life ==
Beard was educated at Alexandra College, gaining a first class honours degree in modern languages in 1907. She continued to Somerville College, Oxford, gaining another first-class honours degree in German. After teaching at Nottingham High School for a year, she became lecturer in modern languages at Girton College, Cambridge. Dora Russell recalled her there as "a tall elegant Irish woman with a slight stoop and a lorgnette and a very agreeable brogue". After Girton she lectured in modern languages at Somerville College. From 1918 to 1920 she worked as an Administrative Assistant in the Livestock Branch of the Ministry of Food, for which she was appointed an OBE in 1920.

Beard was headmistress of Putney High School from 1920 to 1930. At weekends she lived with her Girton friend Eileen Power, in a half-house at 20 Mecklenburgh Square. In 1930 she moved to be headmistress of Crofton Grange School, staying there until her retirement.

She died on 15 October 1958. Papers relating to her are held by the UCL Institute of Education.

== Works ==
- (tr.) Emotion and insanity by Sophus Thalbitzer. London: K. Paul, Trench, Trubner & Co., Ltd., 1926. The International Library of Psychology, Philosophy and Scientific Method.
- (tr. with Nadine Marshall) Economic and social foundations of European civilization by Alfons Dopsch. London: K. Paul, Trench, Trubner, & Co., Ltd., 1937.
