= Lucifer and Prometheus =

1952 work of psychological literary criticism by R.J. Zwi Werblowsky

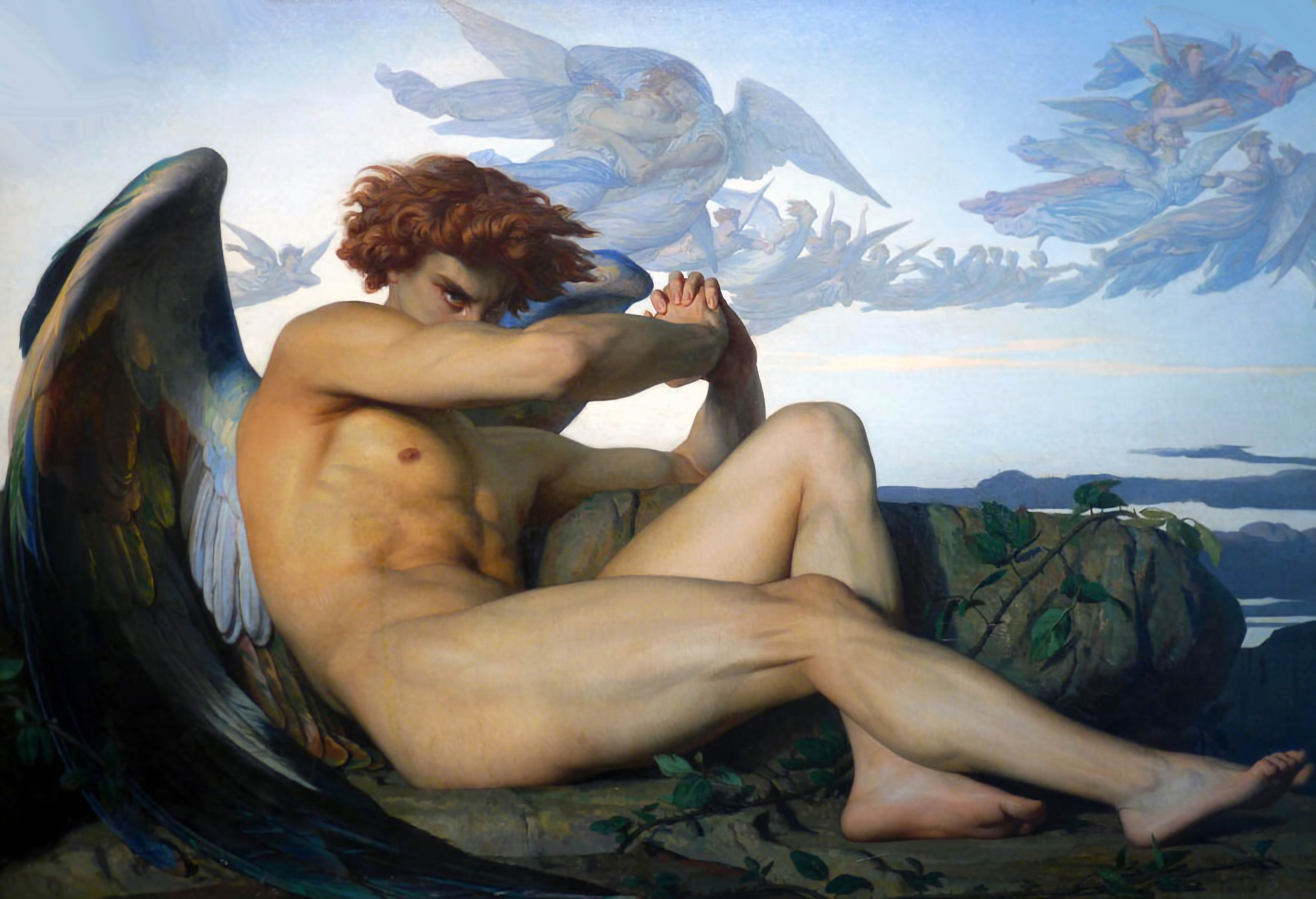
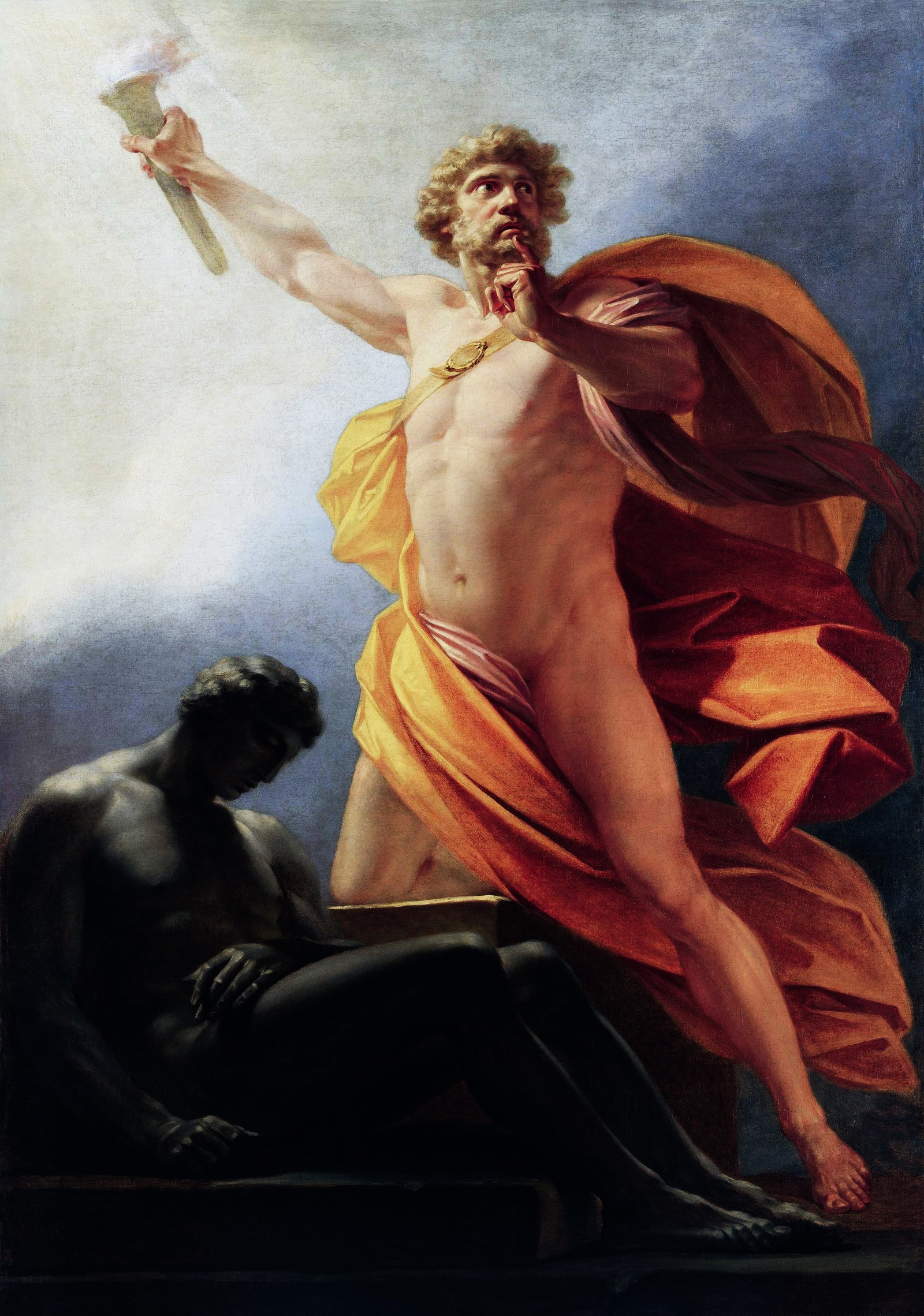
Top - Lucifer as depicted in The Fallen Angel by Alexandre Cabanel (1847), Bottom - Prometheus bringing fire, by Heinrich Friedrich Füger (circa 1817)

Lucifer and Prometheus is a work of psychological literary criticism written by R.J. Zwi Werblowsky and published in 1952. In it, Werblowsky argues that the Satan (Note: For Werblowsky's purposes, the names "Satan" and "Lucifer" are used more or less interchangeably.) of John Milton's Paradise Lost became a disproportionately appealing character because of attributes he shares with the Greek Titan Prometheus. It has been called "most illuminating" for its historical and typological perspective on Milton's Satan as embodying both positive and negative values. The book has also been significant in pointing out the essential ambiguity of Prometheus and his dual Christ-like/Satanic nature as developed in the Christian tradition.

Werblowsky uses the terminology of Carl Jung and his school in examining "mythological projections of the human psyche", though he emphasizes that he is not interested in the concept of the archetype in the strict Jungian sense. Rather, he sees the myth of figures such as Satan and Prometheus as expressing "the shortcomings … of the world as conceived by the human soul." The relation of power and civilization is explored through the interaction of the concepts of Old Testament sin and Greek hubris. In this analysis, Satan "becomes the sole power-exponent in this sublunar, post-lapsarian but pre-eschatological universe, and thus stands as the prototype of human civilizing effort."

Werblowsky sets out to explore "the heroic at its limits", and makes explicit the motivating factor of World War II and its horrors in undertaking this study:

The apocalyptic beast let loose has become a reality to our generation, and nobody knows what is still ahead of us. It is understandable therefore that books on the devil have been on the increase lately. … If the attempts of this school have not yet borne much fruit, it is because we fear the devil's sight more than his activity, and because of a very understandable reticence to force open our 'whited sepulchres.'

Lucifer and Prometheus was one of 204 volumes in The International Library of Psychology, Philosophy and Scientific Method series published 1910–1965 and including titles from Jung, Sigmund Freud, Jean Piaget, Erich Fromm and others. It was Werblowsky's first published book. This volume was reissued in 1999 by Routledge. It includes an introduction written by Jung.
