= Kirsoceratidae =

Kirsoceratidae Temporal range: 372.15–365.2 Ma

Scientific classification
- Kingdom: Animalia
- Phylum: Mollusca
- Class: Cephalopoda
- Subclass: †Ammonoidea
- Order: †Goniatitida
- Superfamily: †Tornoceratoidea
- Family: †Kirsoceratidae; Korn, 2002

Genera
- Kirsoceras; Pernoceras; Protornoceras; Tornia

Extinct family of molluscs

Kirsoceratidae is a family of ammonites in the order Goniatitida. It is known from the Devonian of Asia, Europe, and North America.
