= Rupert Lodge =

British-born Canadian philosopher

Rupert Clendon Lodge (1886–1961) was an Anglo-Canadian philosopher, "the most widely read of all philosophers in Canada".

Lodge was born in England, but spent most of his academic career at the University of Manitoba, where he taught from 1920 to 1947. Marshall McLuhan was a student of Lodge in the early 1930s. Lodge's works on Plato remain influential, and were reissued by Routledge in the 2000s and 2010s.

== Works ==
- (tr.) The great problems by Bernardino Varisco. London: G. Allen & Co., 1914.
- The meaning and function of simple modes in the philosophy of John Locke, 1918.
- An Introduction to Logic, 1920.
- Plato's theory of ethics: the moral criterion and the highest good, 1928. In the series The International Library of Psychology, Philosophy and Scientific Method.
- Philosophy of education, 1937.
- The questioning mind; a survey of philosophical tendencies, 1937
- Philosophy of business, Chicago: University of Chicago Press, 1945.
- Plato's theory of education, 1947.
- The great thinkers, 1949.
- Applied philosophy, 1951.
- Plato's theory of art, 1953.
- The philosophy of Plato, 1956.
