= Alfons Dopsch =

Austrian historian

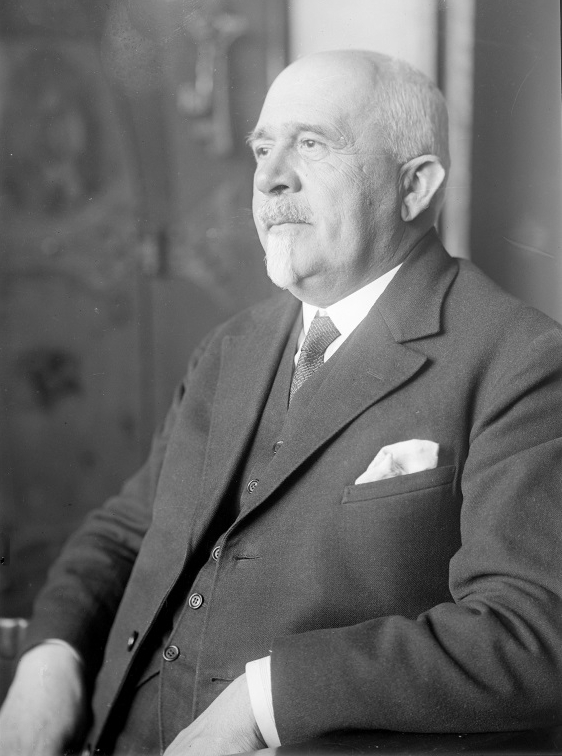
Alfons Dopsch photographed by Ferdinand Schmutzer

Alfons Dopsch (14 June 1868 in Lobositz, Bohemia – 1 September 1953 in Vienna) was an Austrian social and economic historian who specialised in the history of medieval Europe. He studied at Institut fur Osterreichische Geschichtsforschung and was a professor at the University of Vienna from 1898 to 1936.

Dopsch, using archaeological evidence, rejected the highly defined periodization of other scholars in favour of an emphasis on long term continuity and gradual change. He argued that the collapse of the Roman Empire in Western Europe was not as catastrophic as had previously been thought and that the Middle Ages had evolved in an orderly way as the Germans absorbed and developed Roman culture. These views were criticised by the Russian historian Alexander Udaltsov, who argued that Dopsch over emphasised the presence of private land ownership and social inequality among pre-feudal German clans.

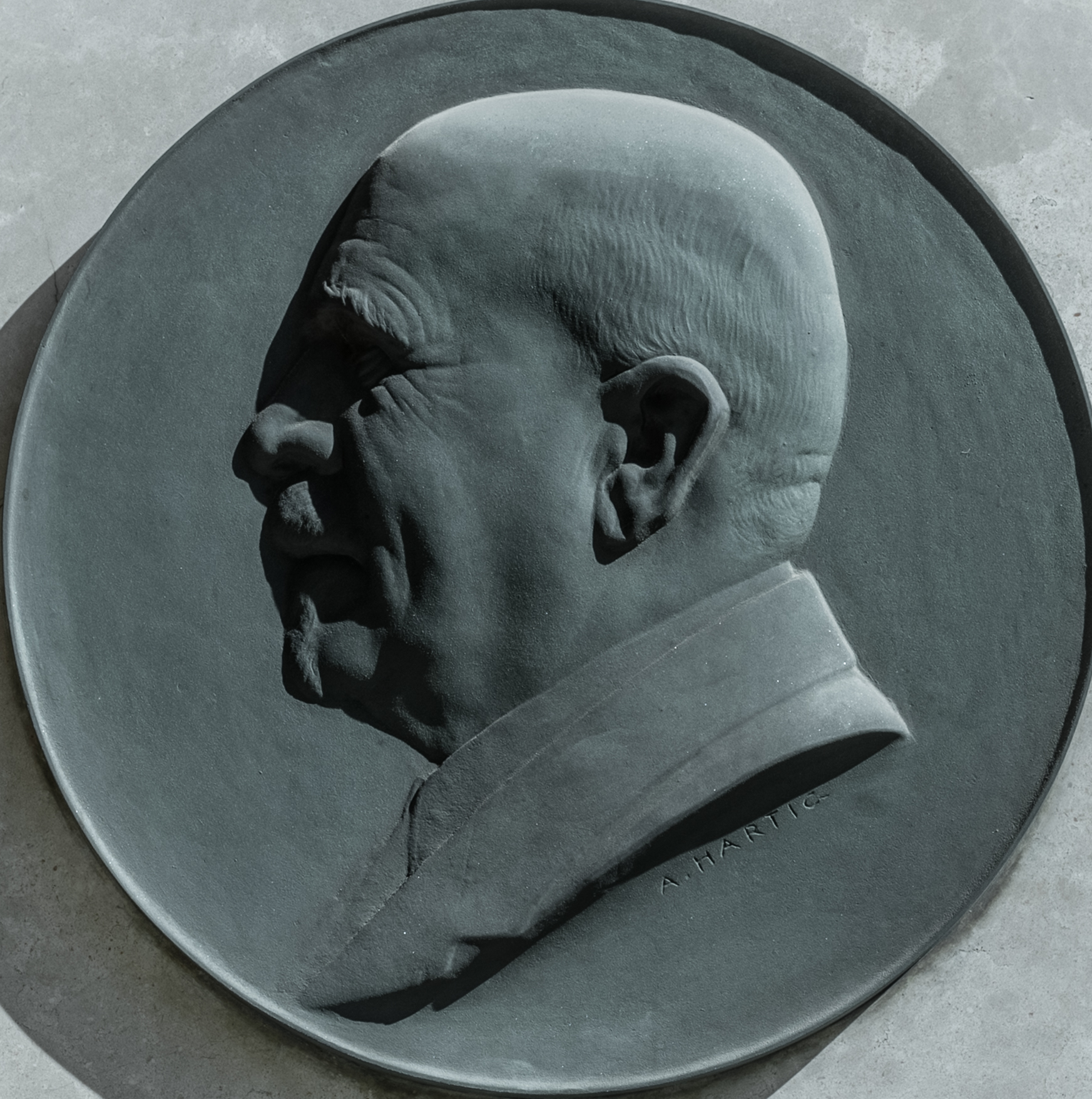
Alfons Dopsch memorial plaque

Some of his views have since been rejected by modern scholars but his work continues to represent an important perspective on the debate about the effects of the collapse of the empire on Western Europe.

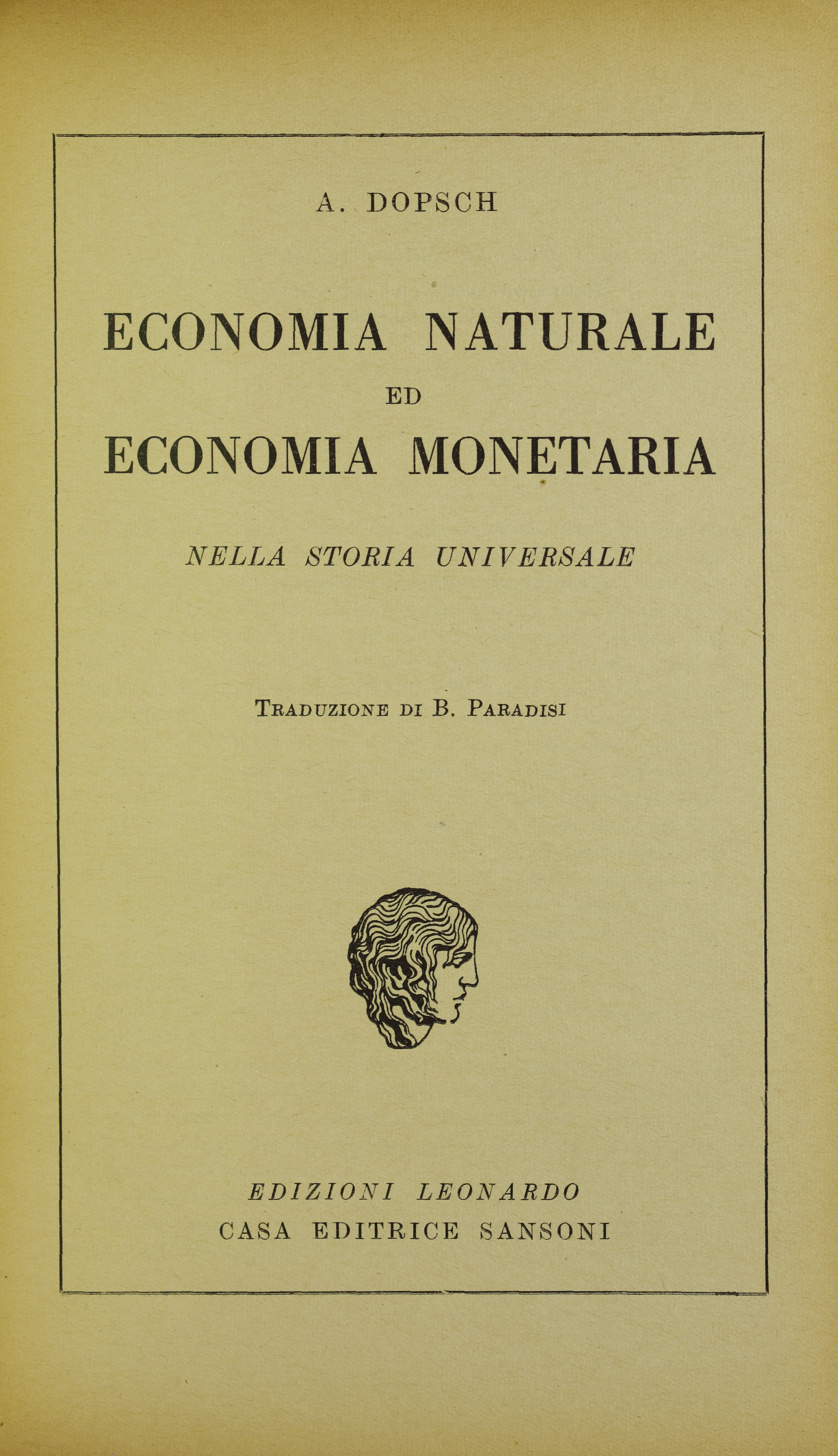
Italian edition of Naturalwirtschaft und Geldwirtschaft in der Weltgeschichte, 1949

== Selected publications ==
- Die Wirtschaftsentwicklung der Karolingerzeit (1912/13)
- Wirtschaftliche und soziale Grundlagen der europäischen Kulturentwicklung von Cäsar bis auf Karl den Großen (1918/20). 2nd ed., 1923-4. Abridged translation by M. G. Beard and Nadine Marshall as The Economic and Social Foundations of European Civilization, 1937.
- "Die historische Stellung der Deutschen in Böhmen", in: Rudolph Lodgman, Deutschböhmen, Ullstein & Co, Berlin (1919).
- Naturalwirtschaft und Geldwirtschaft in der Weltgeschichte (1930)
- Herrschaft und Bauer in der deutschen Kaiserzeit (1934)
