= Posttornoceratinae =

Scientific classification
- Kingdom: Animalia
- Phylum: Mollusca
- Class: Cephalopoda
- Subclass: †Ammonoidea
- Order: †Goniatitida
- Family: †Posttornoceratidae
- Subfamily: †Posttornoceratinae; Bogoslovsky 1962

Genera
- Exotornoceras; Posttornoceras

Extinct subfamily of molluscs

Posttornoceratinae is one of two subfamilies of the Posttornoceratidae family, a member of the Goniatitida order. They are an extinct group of ammonoid, which are shelled cephalopods related to squids, belemnites, octopuses and cuttlefish, and more distantly to the nautiloids.
