= Parodoceratidae =

Scientific classification
- Kingdom: Animalia
- Phylum: Mollusca
- Class: Cephalopoda
- Subclass: †Ammonoidea
- Order: †Goniatitida
- Superfamily: †Tornoceratoidea
- Family: †Parodoceratidae; Petter, 1959

Genera
- Croyites; Parodiceras; Trevoneites; Wedekindella

Extinct family of molluscs

Parodoceratidae is one of five families of the Tornoceratoidea superfamily, a member of the Goniatitida order, first proposed by Germaine petter in 1959. They are an extinct group of ammonoid, which are shelled cephalopods related to squids, belemnites, octopuses, and cuttlefish, and more distantly to the nautiloids.
