= Scientia (Italian journal) =

Scientific journal

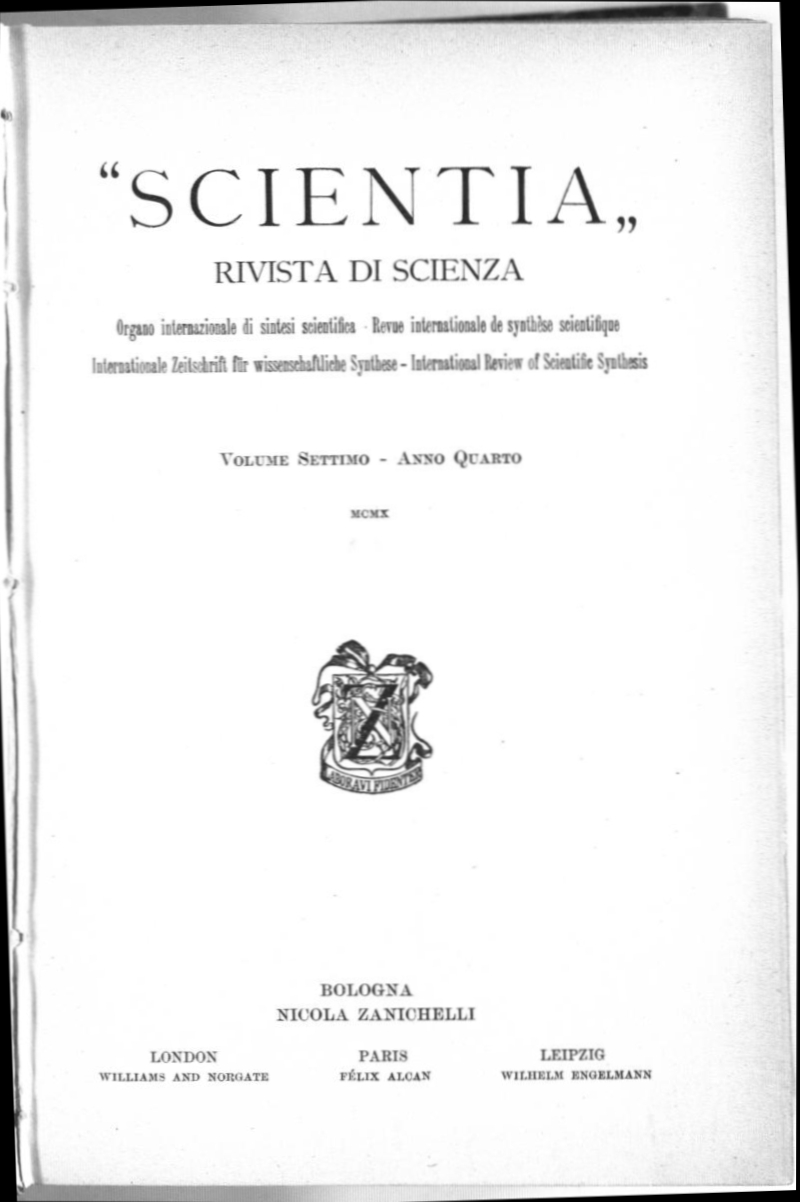
- Language: English

Publication details
- Former name: Rivista di Scientia
- History: 1907–1988
- Publisher: Zanichelli (Italy)

Standard abbreviations
- ISO 4: Scientia

Indexing
- ISSN: 0036-8687
- LCCN: 10030523
- OCLC no.: 1765216

Scientia was an Italian multi-disciplinary scientific journal founded in 1907 by Federigo Enriques and Eugenio Rignano and published by Zanichelli in Bologna with co-publication in England, France, and Germany. The journal's title was originally Rivista di Scientia; the title was simplified to Scientia in 1910, and the original title was carried as a subtitle. The journal thrived in the interwar years 1919–1939 and published articles by many famed scientists, philosophers, and mathematicians including Émile Durkheim and the Nobel prizewinners Albert Einstein, Enrico Fermi, Werner Heisenberg and Louis de Broglie. The journal folded in 1988.

In 2013 a second journal, Scientia (International Review of Scientific Synthesis) was founded in the spirit of the first; the editors write, "Scientia (International Review of Scientific Synthesis) intends to be a tribute to the historical journal, with the same title and the subtitle Rivista di Scienza (that means Review of Science in Italian), printed from 1907 to 1988. The old journal used to publish articles on every area of science, was multilingual and well known at an international level."

The journal is held in the collections of many libraries. Page images for all issues have been posted online by the University of Bologna. Issues through 1925 are also accessible online through links maintained by the HathiTrust. The contents of all issues are posted by PhilPapers.
