= Sophus Thalbitzer =

Sophus Thalbitzer (1871–1941) was a Danish psychiatrist and medical doctor specializing in manic depressive psychoses. He influenced Danish legislation on homosexuality towards decriminalization in 1933. Thalbitzer never married in his life.

== Life ==
In 1912, Thalbitzer became consultant at the St Hans Women's Hospital near Copenhagen. In 1923, he became a member of the Advisory Board of Directors of the Scientific-Humanitarian Committee. In 1924 and 1925 he published two articles on homosexuality, successfully influencing Danish criminal legislation with his 'scientific' defence of the lowering of homosexual age of consent from 21 to 18.

== Works ==
- Emotion and insanity, 1926. Translated by M. G. Beard. The International Library of Psychology, Philosophy and Scientific Method.
