= Boris Bogoslovsky =

Russian-American teacher and United Nations official

Boris Basilyevich Bogoslovsky (Russian: Борис Васильевич Богословский; 29 April 1890 – 2 December 1966) was a Russian-American teacher and United Nations official.

Bogoslovsky was born in Ryazan, Russian Empire. In 1920, he immigrated to the United States, where he became a naturalized citizen. He married a Swedish teacher, Christina Staël von Holstein, and the pair taught at the Cherry Lawn School, a progressive boarding school in Darien, Connecticut. In 1933, they became co-directors of the school. Bogoslovsky taught science there until 1945, when he joined the United Nations as a translator in the UN's Russian Language Section. He was also an observer and translator for the U.S. government at the Nuremberg Trials.

He died in 1966 in Charleston, Illinois.

== Works ==
- The technique of controversy: principles of dynamic logic, 1928. In the series The International Library of Psychology, Philosophy and Scientific Method.
- The ideal school, 1936.
