= Eugenio Rignano =

Italian philosopher

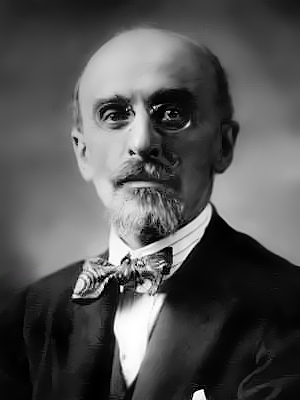
- Born: 31 May 1870; Livorno, Italy
- Died: 9 February 1930 (aged 59); Milan, Italy

Eugenio Vittorio Rignano (31 May 1870 in Livorno – 9 February 1930 in Milan) was a Jewish Italian philosopher.

== Biography ==
He was born in Livorno to Giacomo Rignano and Fortunata Tedesco, into a Jewish family. Rignano edited the journal Rivista di scienza, later known as Scientia (it). His book The Psychology of Reasoning (1923) influenced the social anthropologist Edward Evans-Pritchard. His book Man Not a Machine (1926) was replied to by Joseph Needham's Man A Machine (1927). In 1897 he married Costanza "Nina" Sullam, also from a Jewish family.

Rignano took interest in biology and wrote a book that argued for the inheritance of acquired characteristics. He advanced a moderated Lamarckian hypothesis of inheritance known as "centro-epigenesis". His views were controversial and not accepted by most in the scientific community. His book The Nature of Life (1930) was described in a review as presenting a "militant, at times almost an evangelical exposition and defense of an energetic vitalism." However, historian Peter J. Bowler has written that Rignano rejected both materialism and vitalism and adopted a similar position to what was known as emergent evolution. Li Dazhao, one of the founders of the China Communist Party, was an avid reader of Rignano's works.

Rignano's views on acquired characteristics and organic memory are discussed in detail by historian Laura Otis and psychologist Daniel Schacter.

== Works ==
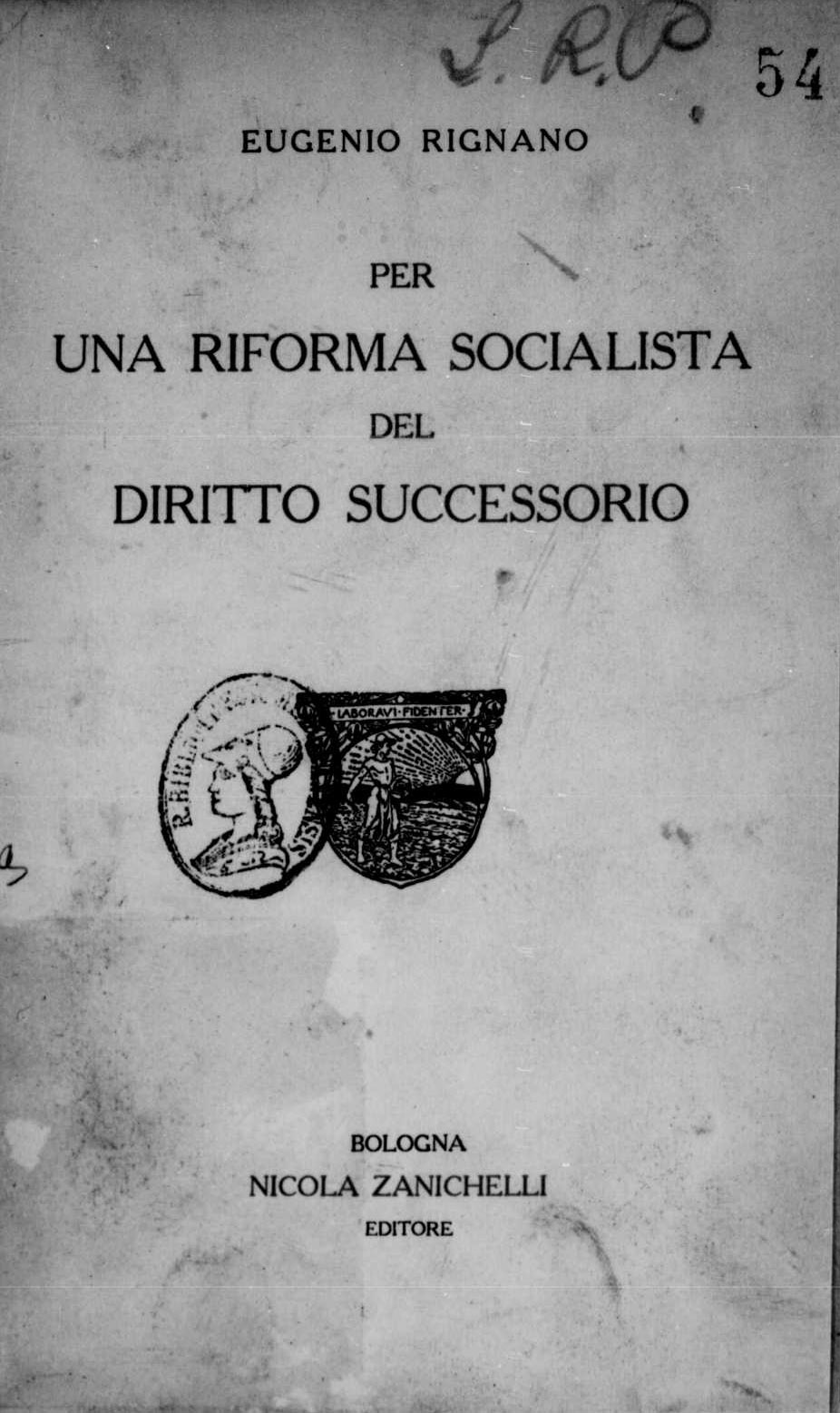
Per una riforma socialista del diritto successorio, 1920

- Di un socialismo in accordo colla dottrina economica liberale, Torino, Fratelli Bocca, 1901.
- (in German) Über die Vererbung erworbener Eigenschaften, Leipzig, Verlag von Wilhelm Engelmann, 1905.
- Sulla trasmissibilità dei caratteri acquisiti. Ipotesi d'una centro-epigenesi, Bologna, Zanichelli, 1907.
- L'adattamento funzionale e la teleologia psico-fisica del Pauly, Bologna: Zanichelli, 1907.
- (in French) La valeur synthétique du transformisme, Paris, Editions de la Revue du Mois, 1907.
- Che cos'è la coscienza?, Bologna, Zanichelli, 1907.
- (in French) Le matérialisme historique, Bologna, Zanichelli, 1908.
- (in French) Le psychisme des organismes inférieurs: (à propos de la théorie de Jennings), Estratto da: «Scientia», anno II, volume 3, Bologna, Zanichelli, 1908.
- (in French) La mémoire biologique en énergétique, Bologna, Zanichelli, 1909.
- Il fenomeno religioso, Bologna, Zanichelli, 1910.
- Il socialismo, Bologna, Zanichelli, 1910.
- Dell'attenzione. Parte 1: contrasto affettivo e unità di coscienza , Bologna, Zanichelli, 1911.
- Dell'origine e natura mnemonica delle tendenze affettive, Bologna, Zanichelli, 1911.
- Per accrescere diffusione ed efficacia alle università popolari, Milano, La compositrice, 1911.
- La vera funzione delle università popolari, Roma, Nuova Antologia, 1911.
- Dell'attenzione. Parte 2: vividità e connessione, Bologna, Zanichelli, 1912.
- (in French) Le rôle des théoriciens dans les sciences biologiques et sociologiques, Bologna, Zanichelli, 1912.
- L'evoluzione del ragionamento, Bologna, Zanichelli, 1913.
- Il nuovo programma dell'Un. pop. milanese: primo anno d'esperimento, Como, Premiata Tipografia Cooperativa comense Aristide Bari, 1913.
- Le forme superiori del ragionamento, Bologna, Zanichelli, 1915.
- Per una riforma socialista del diritto successorio (in Italian). Bologna: Zanichelli. 1920.
- Democrazia e fascismo, Milano, Casa editrice "Alpes", 1924.

=== Translated in English ===
- Upon the Inheritance of Acquired Characters: A Hypothesis of Heredity, Development, and Assimilation. Translated by Harvey, Basil C. H. Chicago: The Open Court Publishing Co. 1906.
- Essays in Scientific Synthesis. Translated by Greenstreet, William John. Chicago: The Open Court Pub. Co. 1918.
- The Psychology of Reasoning. Translated by Holl, Winifred A. London: Kegan Paul, Trench, Trubner & Co., Ltd. 1923.
- The Social Significance of the Inheritance Tax. Translated by Schultz, William John. New York: A.A. Knopf. 1924. Introduction by Edwin R. A. Seligman. English ed. (1925) as The Social Significance of Death Duties, with an introduction by Sir Josiah Stamp.
- Man Not a Machine: A Study of the Finalistic Aspects of Life. London: K. Paul, Trench, Trubner & Co., Ltd. 1926. With a foreword by Professor Hans Driesch.
- Biological Memory. Translated by MacBride, Ernest. London: The International Library of Psychology, Philosophy and Scientific Method. 1926.
- The Aim of Human Existence: Being a System of Morality Based on the Harmony of Life. Translated by Crissman, Paul; Schaub, Edward L. Chicago: The Open Court Pub. Co. 1929. Reprinted from The Monist, January, 1929.
- The Nature of Life. Translated by Mallinson, N. London: K. Paul, Trench, Trubner & Co., Ltd. 1930.
