= Ring theory (psychology) =

Concept or paradigm in psychology

Diagram of ring theory showing circles of acquaintance and direction of travel for comfort and "dumping"

Ring theory is a concept or paradigm in psychology that recommends a strategy for dealing with the stress a person may feel when someone they encounter, know or love is undergoing crisis. The concept, developed by clinical psychologist Susan Silk, and first described in a Los Angeles Times article, advises those surrounding a person in crisis to direct expressions of their own feelings of stress toward those less close to that person and direct only support toward those closer to the person, using a diagram of concentric circles to illustrate the concept.

== Concept ==
The concept consists of a series of concentric rings with the person in crisis in the center and each larger ring containing those next closest to the person in crisis. The second ring may include a spouse, parents, children, or siblings of the person in the center. The third ring might include close friends, and the fourth coworkers or less intimate friends. The fifth might include acquaintances, medical professionals, and first responders. A sixth ring could include bystanders. In some cases there may be multiple people in the center, such as the parents or children of someone who has died, or a family who has lost their home.

Each person in the diagram is advised to "comfort in, dump out", which Silk calls the "kvetching order". The person in the center of the circle of rings can talk about their stress ("dump") to anyone, but those in other rings can only dump to those in larger rings than their own. When talking to someone in a smaller ring than one's own, one can only offer support and comfort and cannot discuss one's own feelings about the situation, as discussing one's own difficult feelings only adds to the stress the person in the smaller ring is already experiencing and is therefore unhelpful. Giving unasked-for advice, sharing of similar experiences, and offering platitudes are examples of non-supportive attempts to support or comfort and are included in "dumping in".

== Development ==
Silk developed the concept when she was being treated for breast cancer and told a colleague who wanted to visit that she was not feeling well enough for visitors. The colleague told her Silk's illness was difficult for those around her, too, saying "This isn't just about you." Silk experienced this as an abandonment and loss of support. Soon after, a woman told Silk of a similar experience: when the woman was in intensive care, one of the woman's friends told the woman's husband, "I wasn't prepared for this. I don't know if I can handle it."

Silk and her husband wrote an article for the Los Angeles Times:

Here are the rules. The person in the center ring can say anything she wants to anyone, anywhere. She can kvetch and complain and whine and moan and curse the heavens and say, "Life is unfair" and "Why me?" That's the one payoff for being in the center ring. Everyone else can say those things too, but only to people in larger rings.

== Analysis ==
Developmental psychologist Deborah L. Davis, writing in Psychology Today, calls it "a model of caring that clearly, concretely delineates appropriate versus inappropriate interactions with everyone around you during times of crisis or tragedy".

Laura Otis, a neuroscientist and literary scholar also writing in Psychology Today, opined, however, that the model might "[keep] friends from reaching out to those in need". She argues that Ring Theory oversimplifies complex human dynamics, uses stigmatized words such as "dumping" to infantilize emotions by comparing them to waste, and may not apply across genders and cultures.
