= Alexander Udaltsov =

Russian medieval historian (1883–1958)

Alexander Dmitriyevich Udaltsov (Russian: Александр Дмитриевич Удальцов; 14 May [O.S. 2 May] 1883 – 25 September 1958) was a Russian medieval historian. Much of his writing concerns the medieval period in Western Europe, but he also wrote about the methodology of historical materialism, archeology and the ethnogenesis of the Slavs.

In 1908, he married the artist Nadezhda Andreyevna Prudkovskaya. She was known throughout her career as Nadezhda Udaltsova, although she divorced David and married Alexander Drevin in 1919.

He wrote about the Agrarian History of Carolingian Flanders criticising the views of the Austrian social and economic historian Alfons Dopsch. He argued that Dopsch overemphasized the presence of private land ownership and social inequality among pre-feudal German clans.

== Works ==
- "Происхождение славян" (Origin of the Slavs), Voprosy Istorii No. 7 1947 pp 95-100
