= Laura Otis =

American historian

- Born: 1967 (age 58–59)

Academic background
- Education: Yale University; University of California, San Francisco; Cornell University

Academic work
- Discipline: Literature and science
- Institutions: Emory University

Laura Otis is a Professor of English at Emory University who works on literature and science.

She graduated from Yale University with a B.S. in Molecular Biophysics and Biochemistry in 1983, and from the University of California, San Francisco with an M.A. in Neuroscience in 1988, and from Cornell University with a Ph.D. in Comparative Literature in 1991.

She was a guest scholar at the Max Planck Institute for the History of Science.

== Awards ==
- 2000 MacArthur Fellows Program

== Works ==
- Organic Memory: History and the Body in the Late Nineteenth and Early Twentieth Centuries. Lincoln, NE: University of Nebraska Press, 1994. ISBN 978-0-8032-3561-8
- Membranes: Metaphors of Invasion in Nineteenth-Century Literature, Science, and Politics. Baltimore, MD: JHU Press, 2000, ISBN 978-0-8018-6527-5
- Networking: Communicating with Bodies and Machines in the Nineteenth Century. Ann Arbor, MI: University of Michigan Press, 2001. ISBN 978-0-472-11213-5
- Translator: Vacation Stories: Five Science Fiction Tales, Santiago Ramon y Cajal, Champaign, IL: University of Illinois Press, 2001. ISBN 978-0-252-02655-3
- Editor: Literature and Science in the Nineteenth Century: An Anthology, Oxford: Oxford University Press, 2002. ISBN 978-0-19-955465-2
- Müller's Lab, New York: Oxford University Press US, 2007, ISBN 978-0-19-530697-2
