= International Association for the History of Religions =

Academic organization

The International Association for the History of Religions (IAHR) is a global academic organization dedicated to the critical, cross-cultural, and non-confessional study of religion. It was formally established in 1950 during the 7th International Congress for the History of Religions in Amsterdam, though its roots trace back to earlier congresses dating from 1900. The IAHR operates as an umbrella organization comprising more than 50 affiliated national and regional scholarly societies. It is a member of the Conseil International de la Philosophie et des Sciences Humaines (CIPSH), which is part of UNESCO.

The IAHR organizes a World Congress every five years, which serves as one of the most prominent forums for scholarly exchange in the academic study of religion. Its official journal is Numen: International Review for the History of Religions, a peer-reviewed publication founded in 1954 and published by Brill. The IAHR has also launched a book series titled The Study of Religion in a Global Context with Equinox Publishing in 2016.

Scholars such as Eric Sharpe and Russell T. McCutcheon have recognized the IAHR’s influence in shaping a comparative and historically grounded approach to religion within a global framework.
