= Hans Vaihinger =

German philosopher (1852–1933)

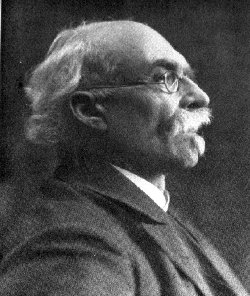
- Born: September 25, 1852; Nehren, Kingdom of Württemberg, German Confederation
- Died: December 18, 1933 (aged 81); Halle, Province of Saxony, Nazi Germany

Education
- Education: University of Tübingen; Leipzig University; University of Berlin
- Doctoral advisor: Christoph von Sigwart
- Other advisors: Hermann von Helmholtz; Eduard Zeller

Philosophical work
- Era: Contemporary philosophy
- Region: Western philosophy
- School: Neo-Kantianism
- Institutions: University of Strasbourg; University of Halle
- Notable students: Oswald Spengler
- Main interests: Epistemology
- Notable ideas: Fictionalism (philosophy of 'as if')

Hans Vaihinger (/ˈvaɪhɪŋɡər/; German: [ˈhans ˈfaɪ.ɪŋɐ]; September 25, 1852 – December 18, 1933) was a German philosopher, best known as a Kant scholar and for his Die Philosophie des Als Ob (The Philosophy of 'As if'), published in 1911 although its statement of basic principles had been written more than thirty years earlier.

== Early life and education ==
Vaihinger was born in Nehren, Württemberg, Germany, near Tübingen, and raised in what he described as a "very religious atmosphere". He was educated at the University of Tübingen (the Tübinger Stift), Leipzig University, and the University of Berlin.

== Career ==
Vaihinger became a tutor and later a philosophy professor at the University of Strasbourg. In 1884 he moved to the University of Halle, where from 1892 he was a full professor.

== Personal life and death ==
By 1900 Vaihinger's health had deteriorated. His health, especially his failing eyesight, forced Vaihinger to step down from his professorship. In 1926 he suffered complete blindness.

He died on December 18, 1933.

== Work ==
In Die Philosophie des Als Ob (The Philosophy of 'As if', 1911), Vaihinger argued that human beings can never really know the underlying reality of the world, and that as a result people construct systems of thought and then assume that these match reality: they behave "as if" the world matches their models. In particular, he used examples from the physical sciences, such as protons, electrons, and electromagnetic waves. None of these phenomena have been observed directly, but science assumes and pretends that they exist, and uses observations made on these assumptions to create new and better constructs.

Vaihinger acknowledged several precursors, especially Kant, and Hermann Lotze and wrote that he felt vindicated by Friedrich Albert Lange, but had been unaware of Jeremy Bentham's Theory of Fictions until, at the very end of his life, it was brought to his attention by his translator, C. K. Ogden.

In the preface to the English edition of his work, Vaihinger expressed his principle of fictionalism: "An idea whose theoretical untruth or incorrectness, and therewith its falsity, is admitted, is not for that reason practically valueless and useless; for such an idea, in spite of its theoretical nullity[,] may have great practical importance." Moreover, Vaihinger denied that his philosophy was a form of skepticism because skepticism implies a doubting, whereas in his 'as if' philosophy the acceptance of patently false fictions is justified as a pragmatic non-rational solution to problems that have no rational answers.

Fictions in this sense, however, Vaihinger considers to be only "half-fictions or semi-fictions". Rather, "real fictions" are those that "are not only in contradiction with reality but self-contradictory in themselves; the concept of the atom, for example, or the 'Ding an sich'." However, the two types "are not sharply divided from one another but are connected by transitions. Thought begins with slight initial deviations from reality (half-fictions), and, becoming bolder and bolder, ends by operating with constructs that are not only opposed to the facts but are self-contradictory."

This philosophy, though, is wider than just science. One can never be sure that the world will still exist tomorrow, but one usually assumes that it will. Alfred Adler, the founder of Individual Psychology, was profoundly influenced by Vaihinger's theory of useful fictions, incorporating the idea of psychological fictions into his personality construct of a fictional final goal.

Vaihinger’s philosophy of 'as if' can be viewed as one of the central premises upon which George Kelly's personal construct psychology is based. Kelly credited Vaihinger with influencing his theory, especially the idea that our constructions are better viewed as useful hypotheses rather than representations of objective reality. Kelly wrote: "Vaihinger's 'as if' philosophy has value for psychology (...) Vaihinger began to develop a system of philosophy he called the "philosophy of 'as if' ". In it he offered a system of thought in which God and reality might best be represented as paradigms. This was not to say that either God or reality was any less certain than anything else in the realm of man’s awareness, but only that all matters confronting man might best be regarded in hypothetical ways".

Frank Kermode's The Sense of an Ending (1967) was an early mention of Vaihinger as a useful methodologist of narrativity. He says that "literary fictions belong to Vaihinger’s category of 'the consciously false.' They are not subject, like hypotheses, to proof or disconfirmation, only, if they come to lose their operational effectiveness, to neglect."

Later, James Hillman developed both Vaihinger and Adler's work with psychological fictions into a core theme of his work Healing Fiction in which he makes one of his more accessible cases for identifying the tendency to literalize, rather than "see through our meanings", with neurosis and madness.

== Critical reception and legacy ==
During his own lifetime Vaihinger's works were generally well received both in Germany and abroad, especially in America. When, in 1924, his Philosophy of As If was published in English, the original 1911 book was already in its sixth edition. However, the American journalist H. L. Mencken was scathing in his criticism of the book, which he dismissed as an unimportant "foot-note to all existing systems". Vaihinger was also criticised by the Logical positivists who made "curt and disparaging references" to his work.

After his death, and the intellectual sea change that followed the Second World War, Vaihinger's work received little attention from philosophers. It was left to psychologists such as Kelly and writers such as Kermode to draw upon his central ideas. However, the interest of literary scholars has continued modestly with the publication of some recent "Vaihinger-inflected critical literature". A reappraisal of Vaihinger by the American philosopher Arthur Fine concluded that Vaihinger was actually the "preeminent twentieth-century philosopher of [scientific] modeling". Vaihinger's influence has since markedly increased, and the currently booming fictionalism movement in the philosophy of science takes his contributions as its main historical lead and inspiration.

== Works ==
- 1876: Hartmann, Dühring und Lange (Hartmann, Dühring and Lange)
- 1881–1892: Commentar zu Kants Kritik der reinen Vernunft (Commentary on Kant's Critique of Pure Reason) – Vol. I: 1881 / Vol. II: 1892
  - 2nd edition: Kommentar zu Kants Kritik der reinen Vernunft, Vols. I–II and supplementary volume, ed. Raymund Schmidt, Union Deutsche Verlagsgesellschaft, 1922. Google Books Vol. 1, Vol. 2. Reprinted 1970, Scientia Verlag Aalen.
- 1897–1922: Kant-Studien, founder and chief editor
- 1899: Kant – ein Metaphysiker? (Kant – a Metaphysician?)
- 1902: Nietzsche Als Philosoph (Nietzsche as Philosopher)
- 1906: Philosophie in der Staatsprüfung. Winke für Examinatoren und Examinanden. (Philosophy in the Degree. Cues for teachers and students.)
- 1911: Die Philosophie des Als Ob (The Philosophy of 'As if') – online

Translations

- 1924: The Philosophy of 'As if': A System of the Theoretical, Practical and Religious Fictions of Mankind, translated by C. K. Ogden, first published in England by Routledge and Kegan Paul, Ltd., 1924 – online.
