= The Philosophy of 'As if' =

1911 book by Hans Vaihinger

The Philosophy of 'As if': A System of the Theoretical, Practical and Religious Fictions of Mankind
- Title page of the German edition
- Author: Hans Vaihinger
- Original title: Die Philosophie des Als Ob
- Language: German
- Subjects: Epistemology; Immanuel Kant
- Published: 1911 (Reuther & Reichard, in German); 1924 (Harcourt Brace, in English)
- Publication place: Germany
- Media type: Print (Hardcover and Paperback)
- Pages: 368 (1968 Routledge edition)
- ISBN: 978-1508663751

The Philosophy of 'As if' (hereafter As If) is a 1911 book by the German philosopher Hans Vaihinger, based on his dissertation of 1877, which thereafter became his best known work. It was published in an English translation by C. K. Ogden in 1924.

Within a philosophical framework of epistemology, the book argues for false premises or false assumptions as a viable cognitive heuristic, in the realms of both science and religion. For example, simplified models used in the physical sciences are often formally false, but nevertheless close enough to the truth to furnish useful insight; this is understood as a form of idealization.

== Full title and further editions ==
The full English title of the book is The Philosophy of 'As if': A System of the Theoretical, Practical and Religious Fictions of Mankind (German: Die Philosophie des Als Ob).

Routledge published a new edition of the book in 2021 with a new foreword by Michael A. Rosenthal, a Canadian professor of Jewish Studies, in its 'Routledge Classics' imprint.

== Summary ==
The book presents an epistemology as well as a practical world and life view. Vaihinger describes human knowledge as erroneous and contradictory and asks how to explain the fact that one can still arrive at the right thing based on these false assumptions. Vaihinger's answer is that the assumptions are a practically useful fiction, and that knowledge can therefore only be pragmatically substantiated by the success that is achieved in its application. Religious and metaphysical views, like logic, are not true in an objective sense, since this cannot be established. Instead, the question had to be asked whether it was useful to act "as if" they were true.

== Reception ==
In his biography, Philosopher at Large, Mortimer J. Adler notes that this book was one of his influences on his first book, Dialectic.

== See also ==
- Fictionalism
