= Bogoslovsky =

Bogoslovsky (Russian: Богословский), feminine: Bogoslovskaya is a Russian surname. Boris Unbegaun writes that it originates in the tradition of the surnames of Russian Orthodox clergy. Notable people with the surname include:

- Boris Bogoslovsky
- Nikita Bogoslovsky
- Olga Bogoslovskaya
