= Cambrian =

First geological period of the Paleozoic Era

- 538.8 ± 0.6 – 486.85 ± 1.5 Ma
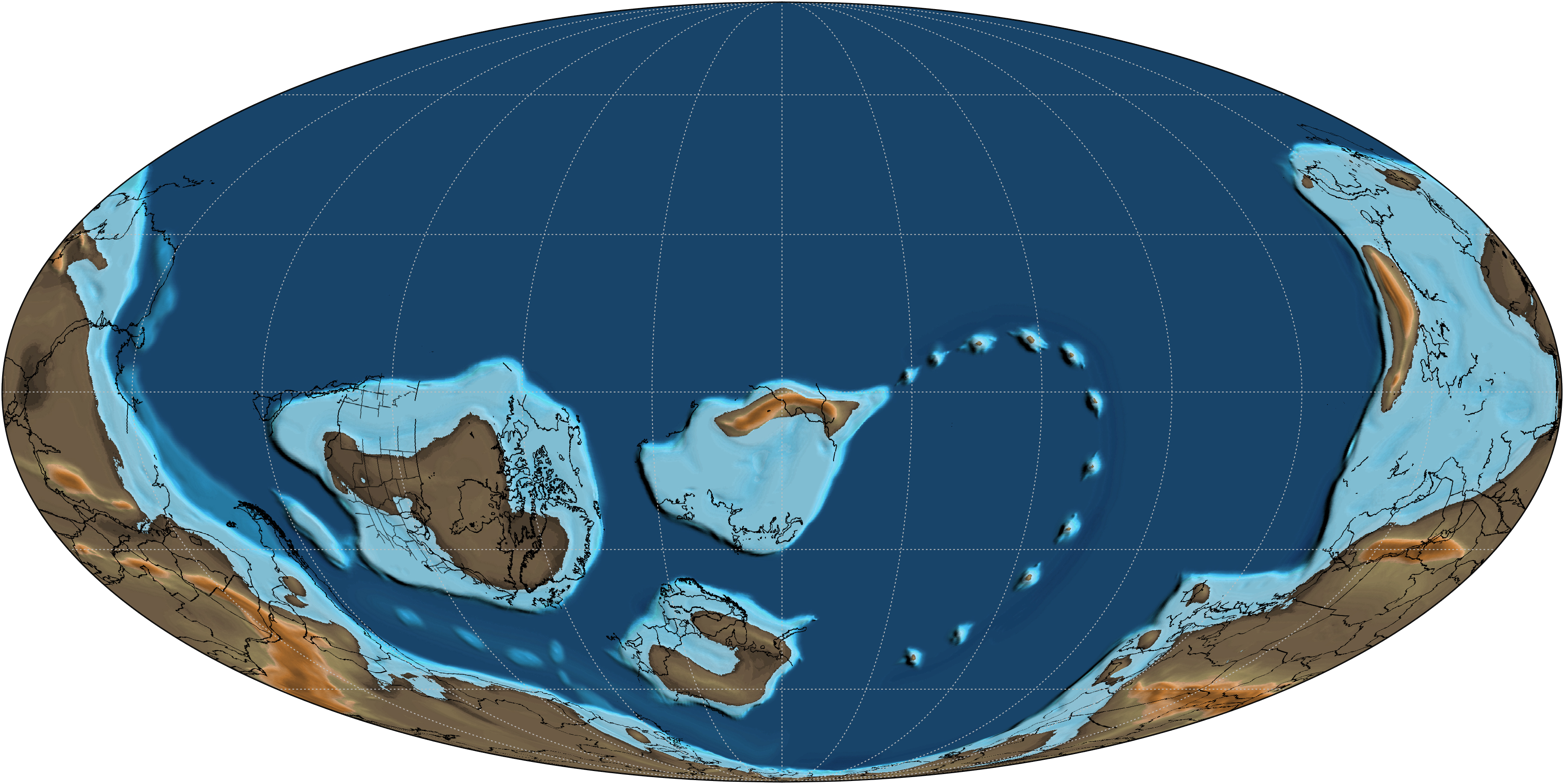
- A paleomap of Earth as it appeared 515 million years ago during the Cambrian Period, Series 2 epoch

Chronology
| ← / Orsten Fauna; ← / Dresbachian extinction; ← / Burgess Shale; ← / Kaili biota; ← / Archaeocyatha extinction; ← / Emu Bay Shale; ← / Sirius Passet biota; ← / Chengjiang biota; ← / First Trilobites; ← / SSF diversification, first brachiopods & archaeocyatha; ← / First halkieriids, mollusсs, hyoliths SSF; ← / Baykonurian glaciation |
Major glacial period
Subdivision of the Cambrian according to the ICS, as of 2024. Vertical axis scale: Millions of years ago

Etymology
- Name formality: Formal

Usage information
- Celestial body: Earth
- Regional usage: Global (ICS)
- Time scale(s) used: ICS Time Scale

Definition
- Chronological unit: Period
- Stratigraphic unit: System
- First proposed by: Adam Sedgwick, 1835
- Time span formality: Formal
- Lower boundary definition: Appearance of the Ichnofossil Treptichnus pedum
- Lower boundary GSSP: Fortune Head section, Newfoundland, Canada; 47.0762°N 55.8310°W
- Lower GSSP ratified: August 1992 (as base of Cambrian)
- Upper boundary definition: FAD of the Conodont Iapetognathus fluctivagus.
- Upper boundary GSSP: Greenpoint section, Green Point, Newfoundland, Canada; 49.6829°N 57.9653°W
- Upper GSSP ratified: January 2000

Atmospheric and climatic data
- Sea level above present day: Rising steadily from 4 m to 90 m

The Cambrian ( /ˈkæmbri.ən, ˈkeɪm-/ KAM-bree-ən, KAYM-) is the first geological period of the Paleozoic Era and the Phanerozoic Eon. The Cambrian lasted 51.95 million years from the end of the preceding Ediacaran Period 538.8 Ma (million years ago) to the beginning of the Ordovician Period 486.85 Ma.

Most of the continents were located in the southern hemisphere surrounded by the vast Panthalassa Ocean. The assembly of Gondwana during the Ediacaran and early Cambrian led to the development of new convergent plate boundaries and continental-margin arc magmatism along its margins that helped drive up global temperatures. Laurentia lay across the equator, separated from Gondwana by the opening Iapetus Ocean.

The Cambrian marked a profound change in life on Earth; prior to the period, the majority of living organisms were small, unicellular, and poorly preserved. Complex, multicellular organisms gradually became more common during the Ediacaran, but it was not until the Cambrian that fossil diversity seems to have rapidly increased, an event known as the Cambrian explosion, producing the first representatives of most modern animal phyla. The period is also unique in its unusually high proportion of lagerstätte deposits, sites of exceptional preservation where "soft" parts of organisms are preserved as well as their more resistant shells.

== Etymology and history ==
The term Cambrian is derived from a Latin version of Cymru, the Welsh name for Wales, where rocks of this age were first studied. The geological term was named by Adam Sedgwick based on work done in the summer of 1831 in North Wales. Sedgwick divided it into three groups: the Lower, Middle, and Upper Cambrian. He defined the boundary between the Cambrian and the overlying Silurian, together with Roderick Murchison, in their joint paper "On the Silurian and Cambrian Systems, Exhibiting the Order in which the Older Sedimentary Strata Succeed each other in England and Wales" (1836). The proposal to label the period Cambrian was based on a segment of rock strata that represented a period of geological time.

This early agreement did not last. Due to the scarcity of fossils, Sedgwick used rock types to identify Cambrian strata. He was also slow in publishing further work. The clear fossil record of the Silurian, however, allowed Murchison to correlate rocks of a similar age across Europe and Russia, and on these he published extensively. As increasing numbers of fossils were identified in older rocks, he extended the base of the Silurian downwards into the Sedgwick's "Upper Cambrian", claiming all fossilised strata for "his" Silurian series. Matters were complicated further when, in 1852, fieldwork carried out by Sedgwick and others revealed an unconformity within the Silurian, with a clear difference in fauna between the two. This allowed Sedgwick to now claim a large section of the Silurian for "his" Cambrian and gave the Cambrian an identifiable fossil record. The dispute between the two geologists and their supporters, over the boundary between the Cambrian and Silurian, would extend beyond the life times of both Sedgwick and Murchison. It was not resolved until 1879, when Charles Lapworth proposed the disputed strata belong to its own system, which he named the Ordovician.

The term Cambrian for the oldest period of the Paleozoic was officially agreed in 1960, at the 21st International Geological Congress. It only includes Sedgwick's "Lower Cambrian series", but its base has been extended into much older rocks.

== Geology ==
=== Stratigraphy ===
Systems, series and stages can be defined globally or regionally. For global stratigraphic correlation, the ICS ratify rock units based on a Global Boundary Stratotype Section and Point (GSSP) from a single formation (a stratotype) identifying the lower boundary of the unit. Currently the boundaries of the Cambrian System, three series and six stages are defined by global stratotype sections and points.

| Series/epoch | Stage/age | Lower boundary |
|---|---|---|
| Furongian | Cambrian Stage 10 | 491 Ma |
| Furongian | Jiangshanian | 494.2 Ma |
| Furongian | Paibian | 497 Ma |
| Miaolingian | Guzhangian | 500.5 Ma |
| Miaolingian | Drumian | 504.5 Ma |
| Miaolingian | Wuliuan | 506.5 Ma |
| Cambrian Series 2 | Cambrian Stage 4 | 514.5 Ma |
| Cambrian Series 2 | Cambrian Stage 3 | 521 Ma |
| Terreneuvian | Cambrian Stage 2 | 529 Ma |
| Terreneuvian | Fortunian | 538.8 ± 0.6 Ma |

==== Ediacaran–Cambrian boundary ====
The lower boundary of the Cambrian was originally held to represent the first appearance of complex life, represented by trilobites. The recognition of small shelly fossils before the first trilobites, and Ediacara biota substantially earlier, has led to calls for a more precisely defined base to the Cambrian Period.

Despite the long recognition of its distinction from younger Ordovician rocks and older Precambrian rocks, it was not until 1994 that the Cambrian system/period was internationally ratified. After decades of careful consideration, a continuous sedimentary sequence at Fortune Head, Newfoundland, Canada, was settled upon as a formal base of the Cambrian Period, which was to be correlated worldwide by the earliest appearance of Treptichnus pedum. Discovery of this fossil a few metres below the GSSP led to the refinement of this statement, and it is the T. pedum ichnofossil assemblage that is now formally used to correlate the base of the Cambrian.

This formal designation allowed radiometric dates to be obtained from samples across the globe that corresponded to the base of the Cambrian. An early date of 570 Ma quickly gained favour, though the methods used to obtain this number are now considered to be unsuitable and inaccurate. A more precise analysis using modern radiometric dating yields a date of 538.8 ± 0.6 Ma. The ash horizon in Oman from which this date was recovered corresponds to a marked fall in the abundance of carbon-13 that correlates to equivalent excursions elsewhere in the world, and to the disappearance of distinctive Ediacaran fossils (Namacalathus, Cloudina). Nevertheless, there are arguments that the dated horizon in Oman does not correspond to the Ediacaran–Cambrian boundary, but represents a facies change from marine to evaporite-dominated strata – which would mean that dates from other sections, ranging from 544 to 542 Ma, are more suitable.

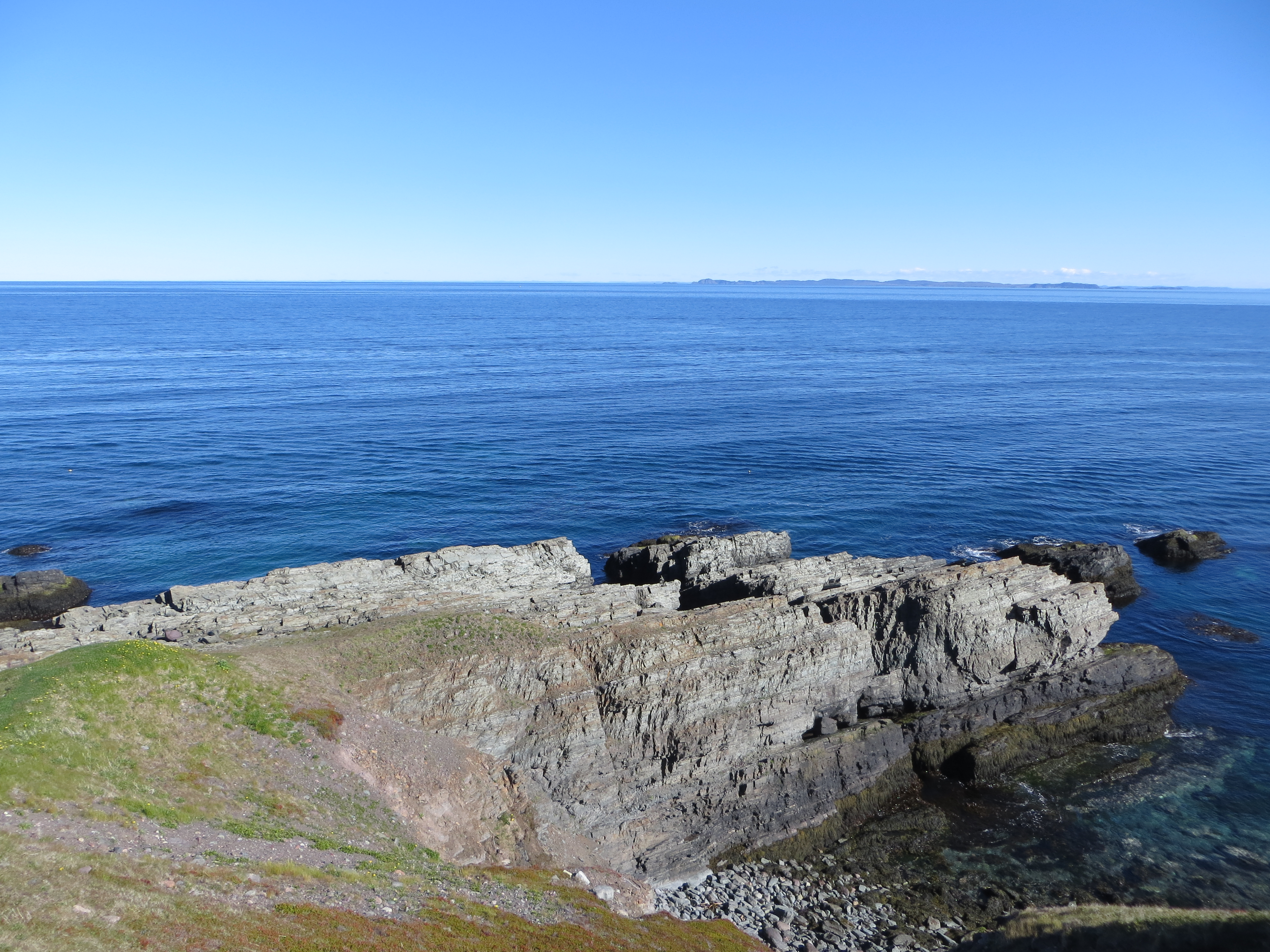
Ediacaran–Cambrian boundary section at Fortune Head, Newfoundland, GSSP

==== Terreneuvian ====
The Terreneuvian is the lowermost series/epoch of the Cambrian, lasting from 538.8 ± 0.6 Ma to c. 521 Ma. It is divided into two stages: the Fortunian stage, 538.8 ± 0.6 Ma to c. 529 Ma; and the unnamed Stage 2, c. 529 Ma to c. 521 Ma. The name Terreneuvian was ratified by the International Union of Geological Sciences (IUGS) in 2007, replacing the previous "Cambrian Series 1". The GSSP defining its base is at Fortune Head on the Burin Peninsula, eastern Newfoundland, Canada (see Ediacaran–Cambrian boundary above). The Terreneuvian is the only series in the Cambrian to contain no trilobite fossils. Its lower part is characterised by complex, sediment-penetrating Phanerozoic-type trace fossils, and its upper part by small shelly fossils.

==== Cambrian Series 2 ====
The second series/epoch of the Cambrian is currently unnamed and known as Cambrian Series 2. It lasted from c. 521 Ma to c. 506.5 Ma. Its two stages are also unnamed and known as Cambrian Stage 3, c. 521 Ma to c. 514.5 Ma, and Cambrian Stage 4, c. 514.5 Ma to c. 506.5 Ma. The base of Series 2 does not yet have a GSSP, but it is expected to be defined in strata marking the first appearance of trilobites in Gondwana. There was a rapid diversification of metazoans during this epoch, but their restricted geographic distribution, particularly of the trilobites and archaeocyaths, have made global correlations difficult, hence ongoing efforts to establish a GSSP.

==== Miaolingian ====
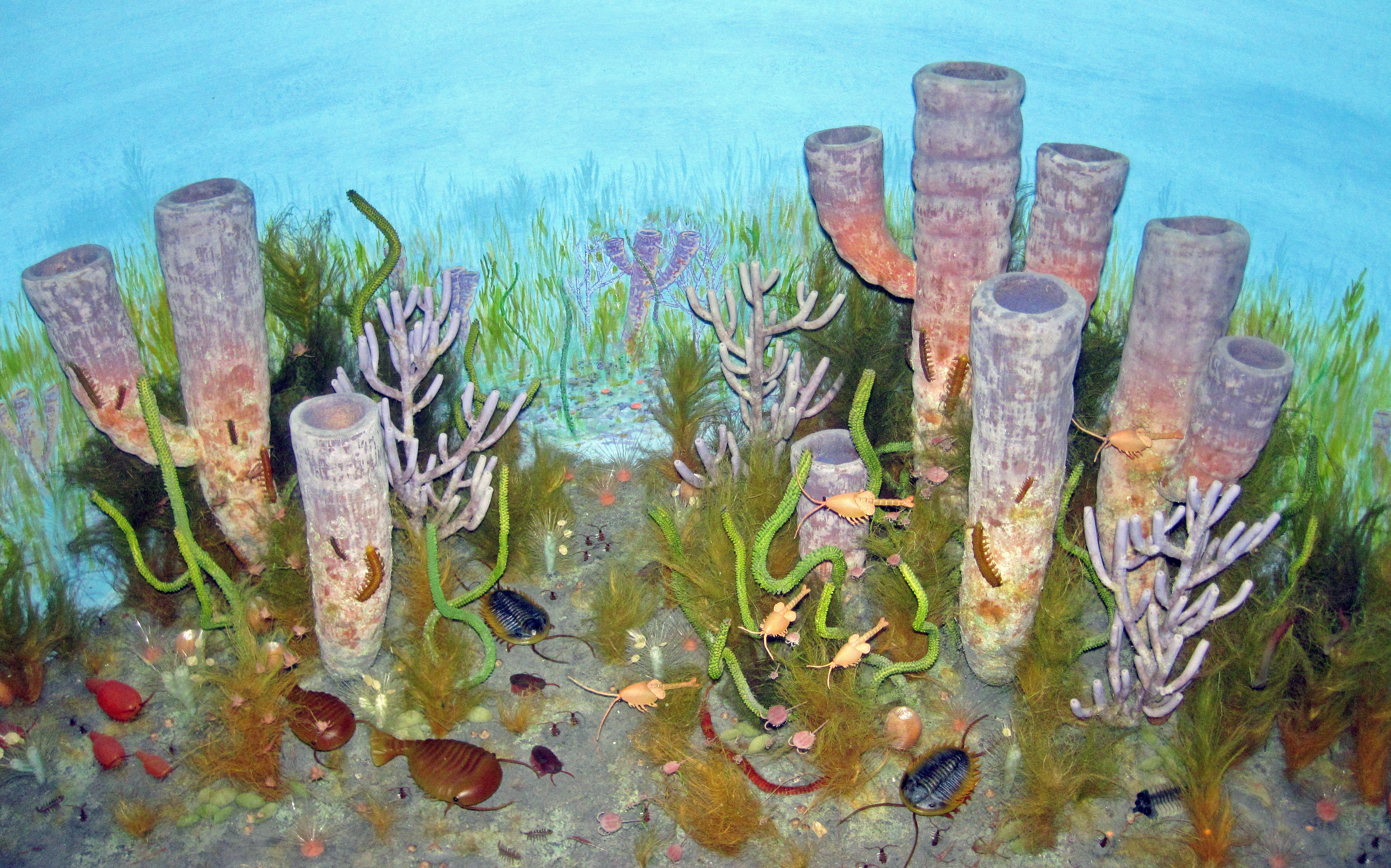
Diorama of the Burgess Shale Biota

The Miaolingian is the third series/epoch of the Cambrian, lasting from c. 506.5 Ma to c. 497 Ma, and roughly identical to the middle Cambrian in older literature. It is divided into three stages: the Wuliuan c. 506.5 Ma to 504.5 Ma; the Drumian c. 504.5 Ma to c. 500.5 Ma; and the Guzhangian c. 500.5 Ma to c. 497 Ma. The name replaces Cambrian Series 3 and was ratified by the IUGS in 2018. It is named after the Miaoling Mountains in southeastern Guizhou Province, South China, where the GSSP marking its base is found. This is defined by the first appearance of the oryctocephalid trilobite Oryctocephalus indicus. Secondary markers for the base of the Miaolingian include the appearance of many acritarchs forms, a global marine transgression, and the disappearance of the polymerid trilobites, Bathynotus or Ovatoryctocara. Unlike the Terreneuvian and Series 2, all the stages of the Miaolingian are defined by GSSPs.

The olenellids, eodiscids, and most redlichiids trilobites went extinct at the boundary between Series 2 and the Miaolingian. This is considered the oldest mass extinction of trilobites.

==== Furongian ====
The Furongian, c. 497 Ma to 486.85 ± 1.5 Ma, is the fourth and uppermost series/epoch of the Cambrian. The name was ratified by the IUGS in 2003 and replaces Cambrian Series 4 and the traditional "Upper Cambrian". The GSSP for the base of the Furongian is in the Wuling Mountains, in northwestern Hunan Province, China. It coincides with the first appearance of the agnostoid trilobite Glyptagnostus reticulatus, and is near the beginning of a large positive δ^{13}C isotopic excursion.

The Furongian is divided into three stages: the Paibian, c. 497 Ma to c. 494 Ma, and the Jiangshanian c. 494.2 Ma to c. 491 Ma, which have defined GSSPs; and the unnamed Cambrian Stage 10, c. 491 Ma to 486.85 ± 1.5 Ma.

==== Cambrian–Ordovician boundary ====
The GSSP for the Cambrian–Ordovician boundary is at Green Point, western Newfoundland, Canada, and is dated at 486.85 Ma. It is defined by the appearance of the conodont Iapetognathus fluctivagus. Where these conodonts are not found the appearance of planktonic graptolites or the trilobite Jujuyaspis borealis can be used. The boundary also corresponds with the peak of the largest positive variation in the δ^{13}C curve during the boundary time interval and with a global marine transgression.

=== Impact structures ===
Major meteorite impact structures include: the early Cambrian (c. 535 Ma) Neugrund crater in the Gulf of Finland, Estonia, a complex meteorite crater about 20 km (12 mi) in diameter, with two inner ridges of about 7 km (4.3 mi) and 6 km (3.7 mi) diameter, and an outer ridge of 8 km (5.0 mi) that formed as the result of an impact of an asteroid 1 km (0.62 mi) in diameter; the 5 km (3.1 mi) diameter Gardnos crater (500±10 Ma) in Buskerud, Norway, where post-impact sediments indicate the impact occurred in a shallow marine environment with rock avalanches and debris flows occurring as the crater rim was breached not long after impact; the 24 km (15 mi) diameter Presqu'ile crater (500 Ma or younger) Quebec, Canada; the 19 km (12 mi) diameter Glikson crater (c. 508 Ma) in Western Australia; the 5 km (3.1 mi) diameter Mizarai crater (500±10 Ma) in Lithuania; and the 3.2 km (2.0 mi) diameter Newporte structure (c. 500 Ma or slightly younger) in North Dakota, U.S.A.

== Paleogeography ==
Reconstructing the position of the continents during the Cambrian is based on palaeomagnetic, palaeobiogeographic, tectonic, geological and palaeoclimatic data. However, these have different levels of uncertainty and can produce contradictory locations for the major continents. This, together with the ongoing debate around the existence of the Neoproterozoic supercontinent of Pannotia, means that while most models agree the continents lay in the southern hemisphere, with the vast Panthalassa Ocean covering most of northern hemisphere, the exact distribution and timing of the movements of the Cambrian continents varies between models.

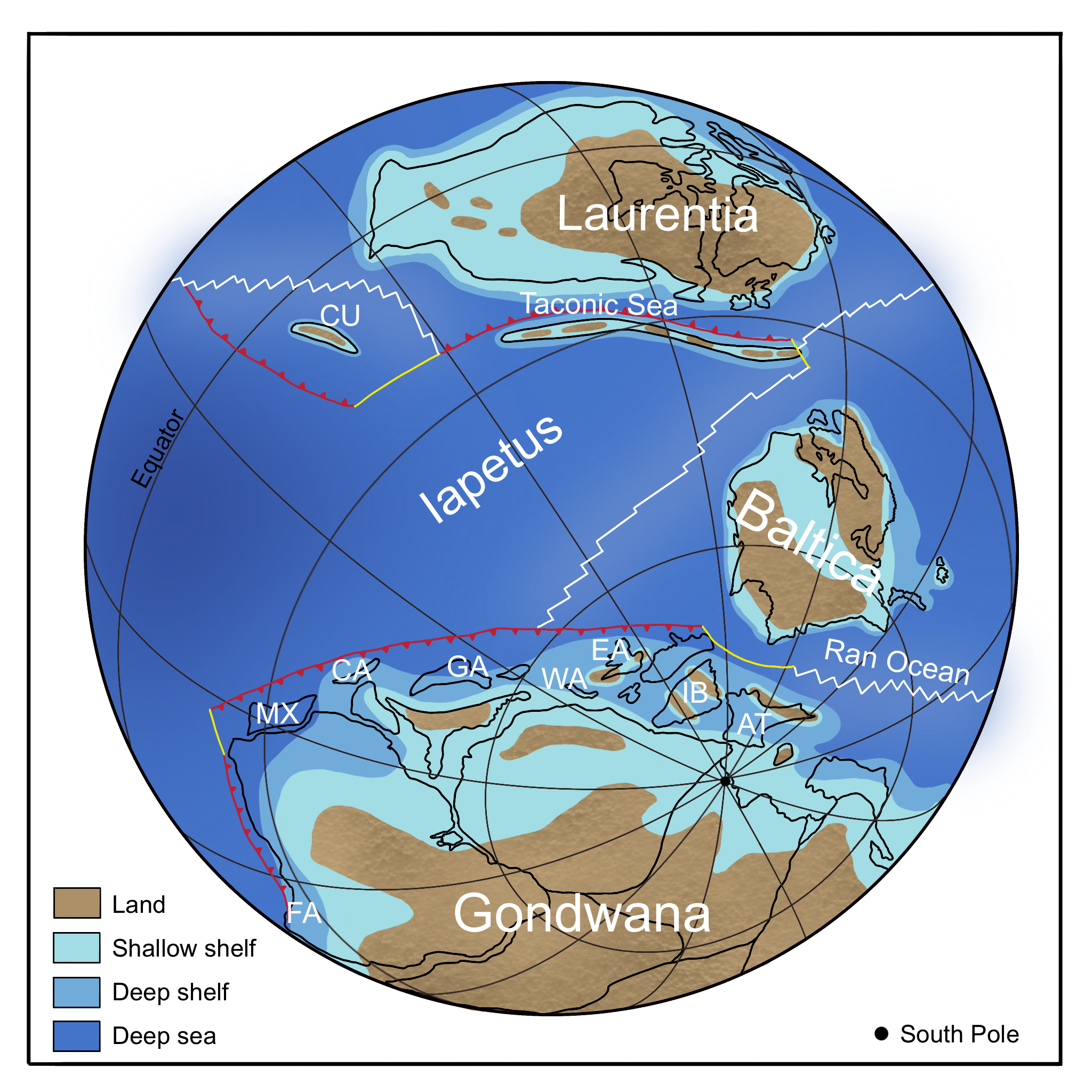
Approximate positions of Gondwana, Laurentia and Baltica in the middle Cambrian (c. 500 Ma). AT: Armorican terrane, CA: Carolinia, CU: Cuyania, EA: East Avalonia, FA: Famatina arc, GA: Ganderia, IB: Iberia, MX: Mixteca–Oaxaca block, WA: West Avalonia. Plate boundaries: red – subduction; white – ridges; yellow – transform.

Most models show Gondwana stretching from the south polar region to north of the equator. Early in the Cambrian, the south pole corresponded with the western South American sector and as Gondwana rotated anti-clockwise, by the middle of the Cambrian, the south pole lay in the northwest African region.

Laurentia lay across the equator, separated from Gondwana by the Iapetus Ocean. Proponents of Pannotia have Laurentia and Baltica close to the Amazonia region of Gondwana with a narrow Iapetus Ocean that only began to open once Gondwana was fully assembled c. 520 Ma. Those not in favour of the existence of Pannotia show the Iapetus opening during the Late Neoproterozoic, with up to c. 6,499 km (4,038 mi) between Laurentia and West Gondwana at the beginning of the Cambrian.

Of the smaller continents, Baltica lay between Laurentia and Gondwana, the Ran Ocean (an arm of the Iapetus) opening between it and Gondwana. Siberia lay close to the western margin of Gondwana and to the north of Baltica. Annamia and South China formed a single continent situated off north central Gondwana. The location of North China is unclear. It may have lain along the northeast Indian sector of Gondwana or already have been a separate continent.

=== Laurentia ===
During the Cambrian, Laurentia lay across or close to the equator. It drifted south and rotated c. 20° anticlockwise during the middle Cambrian, before drifting north again in the late Cambrian.

After the Late Neoproterozoic (or mid-Cambrian) rifting of Laurentia from Gondwana and the subsequent opening of the Iapetus Ocean, Laurentia was largely surrounded by passive margins with much of the continent covered by shallow seas.

As Laurentia separated from Gondwana, a sliver of continental terrane rifted from Laurentia with the narrow Taconic seaway opening between them. The remains of this terrane are now found in southern Scotland, Ireland, and Newfoundland. Intra-oceanic subduction either to the southeast of this terrane in the Iapetus, or to its northwest in the Taconic seaway, resulted in the formation of an island arc. This accreted to the terrane in the late Cambrian, triggering southeast-dipping subduction beneath the terrane itself and consequent closure of the marginal seaway. The terrane collided with Laurentia in the Early Ordovician.

Towards the end of the early Cambrian, rifting along Laurentia's southeastern margin led to the separation of Cuyania (now part of Argentina) from the Ouachita embayment with a new ocean established that continued to widen through the Cambrian and Early Ordovician.

=== Gondwana ===
Gondwana was a massive continent, three times the size of any of the other Cambrian continents. Its continental land area extended from the south pole to north of the equator. Around it were extensive shallow seas and numerous smaller land areas.

The cratons that formed Gondwana came together during the Neoproterozoic to early Cambrian. A narrow ocean separated Amazonia from Gondwana until c. 530 Ma and the Arequipa-Antofalla block united with the South American sector of Gondwana in the early Cambrian. The Kuunga Orogeny between northern (Congo Craton, Madagascar and India) and southern Gondwana (Kalahari Craton and East Antarctica), which began c. 570 Ma, continued with parts of northern Gondwana over-riding southern Gondwana and was accompanied by metamorphism and the intrusion of granites.

Subduction zones, active since the Neoproterozoic, extended around much of Gondwana's margins, from northwest Africa southwards round South America, South Africa, East Antarctica, and the eastern edge of West Australia. Shorter subduction zones existed north of Arabia and India.

The Famatinian continental arc stretched from central Peru in the north to central Argentina in the south. Subduction beneath this proto-Andean margin began by the late Cambrian.

Along the northern margin of Gondwana, between northern Africa and the Armorican terranes of southern Europe, the continental arc of the Cadomian Orogeny continued from the Neoproterozoic in response to the oblique subduction of the Iapetus Ocean. This subduction extended west along the Gondwanan margin and by c. 530 Ma may have evolved into a major transform fault system.

At c. 511 Ma the continental flood basalts of the Kalkarindji large igneous province (LIP) began to erupt. These covered an area of > 2,100,000 km^{2} (810,000 sq mi) across northern, central and Western Australia regions of Gondwana making it one of the largest, as well as the earliest, LIPs of the Phanerozoic. The timing of the eruptions suggests they played a role in the early to middle Cambrian mass extinction.

==== Ganderia, East and West Avalonia, Carolinia and Meguma Terranes ====
The terranes of Ganderia, East and West Avalonia, Carolinia and Meguma lay in polar regions during the early Cambrian, and high-to-mid southern latitudes by the mid to late Cambrian. They are commonly shown as an island arc-transform fault system along the northwestern margin of Gondwana north of northwest Africa and Amazonia, which rifted from Gondwana during the Ordovician. However, some models show these terranes as part of a single independent microcontinent, Greater Avalonia, lying to the west of Baltica and aligned with its eastern (Timanide) margin, with the Iapetus to the north and the Ran Ocean to the south.

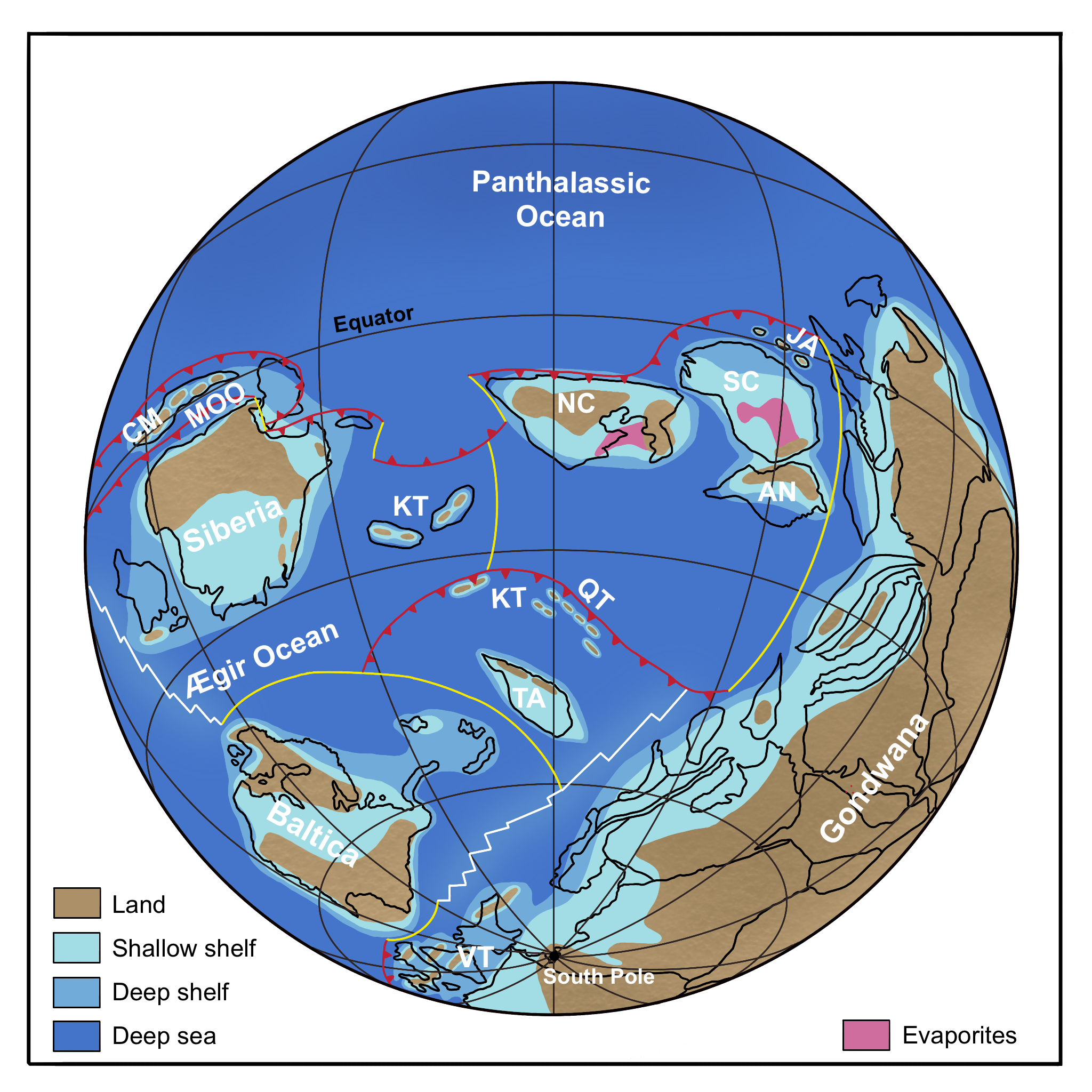
Approximate positions of Siberia, Gondwana, North and South China, Baltica and smaller terranes in the middle Cambrian (c. 500 Ma). AN: Annamia, CM: Central Mongolian terrane, JA: Japan arc, KHT: Kazakhstania terranes, MOO: Mongol-Okhotsk Ocean, NC: North China, QT: Qinling terrane, SC: South China, TA: Tarim microcontinent, VT: Variscan terranes. Plate boundaries: red – subduction; white – ridges; yellow – transform.

=== Baltica ===
During the Cambrian, Baltica rotated more than 60° anti-clockwise and began to drift northwards. This rotation was accommodated by major strike-slip movements in the Ran Ocean between it and Gondwana.

Baltica lay at mid-to-high southerly latitudes, separated from Laurentia by the Iapetus and from Gondwana by the Ran Ocean. It was composed of two continents, Fennoscandia and Sarmatia, separated by shallow seas. The sediments deposited in these unconformably overlay Precambrian basement rocks. The lack of coarse-grained sediments indicates low lying topography across the centre of the craton.

Along Baltica's northeastern margin subduction and arc magmatism associated with the Ediacaran Timanian Orogeny was coming to an end. In this region the early to middle Cambrian was a time of non-deposition and followed by late Cambrian rifting and sedimentation.

Its southeastern margin was also a convergent boundary, with the accretion of island arcs and microcontinents to the craton, although the details are unclear.

=== Siberia ===
Siberia began the Cambrian close to western Gondwana and north of Baltica. It drifted northwestwards to close to the equator as the Ægir Ocean opened between it and Baltica. Much of the continent was covered by shallow seas with extensive archaeocyathan reefs. The then northern third of the continent (present day south; Siberia has rotated 180° since the Cambrian) adjacent to its convergent margin was mountainous.

From the Late Neoproterozoic to the Ordovician, a series of island arcs accreted to Siberia's then northeastern margin, accompanied by extensive arc and back-arc volcanism. These now form the Altai-Sayan terranes. Some models show a convergent plate margin extending from Greater Avalonia, through the Timanide margin of Baltica, forming the Kipchak island arc offshore of southeastern Siberia and curving round to become part of the Altai-Sayan convergent margin.

Along the then western margin, Late Neoproterozoic to early Cambrian rifting was followed by the development of a passive margin.

To the then north, Siberia was separated from the Central Mongolian terrane by the narrow and slowly opening Mongol-Okhotsk Ocean. The Central Mongolian terrane's northern margin with the Panthalassa was convergent, whilst its southern margin facing the Mongol-Okhotsk Ocean was passive.

=== Central Asia ===
During the Cambrian, the terranes that would form Kazakhstania later in the Paleozoic were a series of island arc and accretionary complexes that lay along an intra-oceanic convergent plate margin to the south of North China.

To the south of these the Tarim microcontinent lay between Gondwana and Siberia. Its northern margin was passive for much of the Paleozoic, with thick sequences of platform carbonates and fluvial to marine sediments resting unconformably on Precambrian basement. Along its southeast margin was the Altyn Cambro–Ordovician accretionary complex, whilst to the southwest a subduction zone was closing the narrow seaway between the North West Kunlun region of Tarim and the South West Kunlun terrane.

=== North China ===
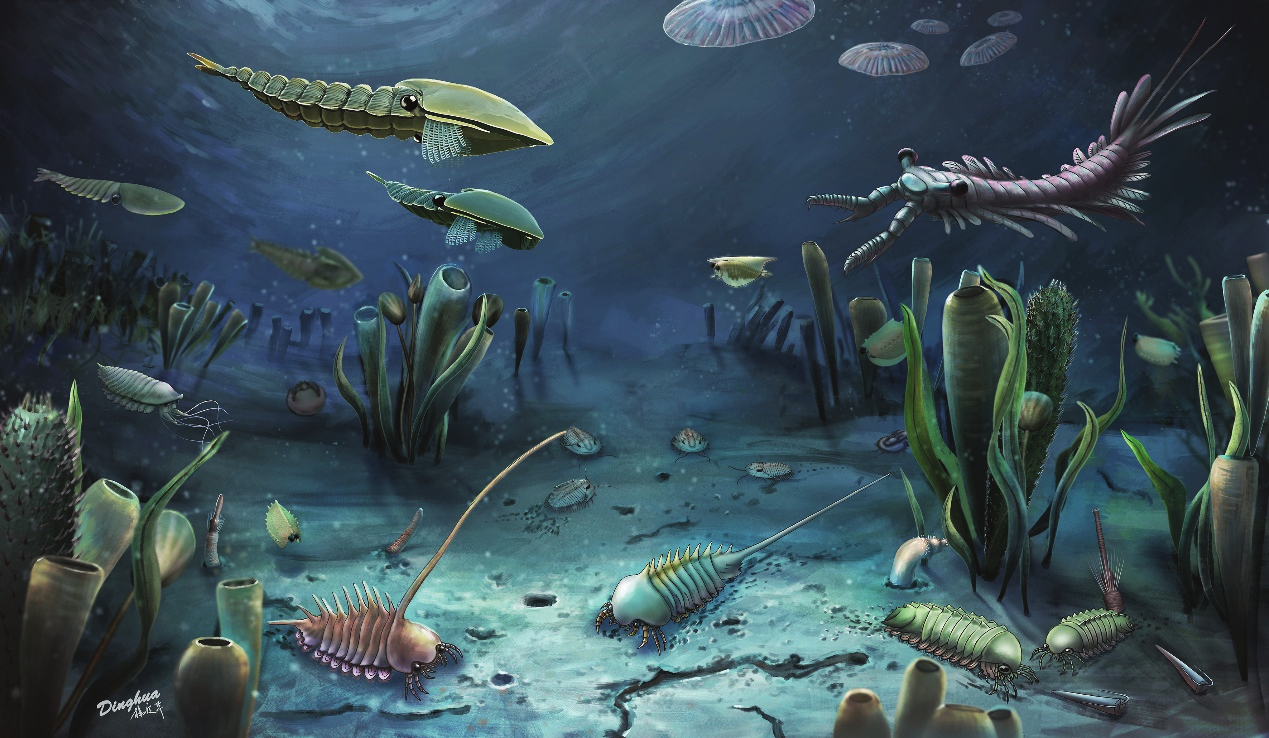
Life reconstruction of the Linyi Lagerstätte in Northern China

North China lay at equatorial to tropical latitudes during the early Cambrian, although its exact position is unknown. Some models show that it lies below the equatorial latitudes. Much of the craton was covered by shallow seas, with land in the northwest and southeast.

Northern North China was a passive margin until the onset of subduction and the development of the Bainaimiao arc in the late Cambrian. To its south was a convergent margin with a southwest dipping subduction zone, beyond which lay the North Qinling terrane (now part of the Qinling Orogenic Belt), together with Qilian-Qaidam, Altyn belts, and South West Kunlun terranes.

=== South China and Annamia ===
South China and Annamia formed a single continent. Strike-slip movement between it and Gondwana accommodated its steady drift northwards from offshore the Indian sector of Gondwana to near the western Australian sector. This northward drift is evidenced by the progressive increase in limestones and increasing faunal diversity.

The northern margin South China, including the South Qinling block, was a passive margin.

Along the southeastern margin, lower Cambrian volcanics indicate the accretion of an island arc along the Song Ma suture zone. Also, early in the Cambrian, the eastern margin of South China changed from passive to active, with the development of oceanic volcanic island arcs that now form part of the Japanese terrane.

== Climate ==
The distribution of climate-indicating sediments, including the wide latitudinal distribution of tropical carbonate platforms, archaeocyathan reefs and bauxites, and arid zone evaporites and calcrete deposits, show the Cambrian was a time of greenhouse climate conditions. During the late Cambrian the distribution of trilobite provinces also indicate only a moderate pole-to-equator temperature gradient. There is evidence of glaciation at high latitudes on Avalonia. However, it is unclear whether these sediments are early Cambrian or actually late Neoproterozoic in age.

Calculations of global average temperatures (GAT) vary depending on which techniques are used. Whilst some measurements show GAT over c. 40 °C (104 °F) models that combine multiple sources give GAT of c. 20–22 °C (68–72 °F) in the Terreneuvian increasing to c. 23–25 °C (73–77 °F) for the rest of the Cambrian. The warm climate was linked to elevated atmospheric carbon dioxide levels. Assembly of Gondwana led to the reorganisation of the tectonic plates with the development of new convergent plate margins and continental-margin arc magmatism that helped drive climatic warming. The eruptions of the Kalkarindji LIP basalts during Stage 4 and into the early Miaolingian, also released large quantities of carbon dioxide, methane and sulphur dioxide into the atmosphere leading to rapid climatic changes and elevated sea surface temperatures.

There is uncertainty around the maximum sea surface temperatures. These are calculated using δ^{18}O values from marine rocks, and there is an ongoing debate about the levels δ^{18}O in Cambrian seawater relative to the rest of the Phanerozoic. Estimates for tropical sea surface temperatures vary from c. 28–32 °C (82–90 °F), to c. 29–38 °C (84–100 °F). Modern average tropical sea surface temperatures are 26 °C (79 °F).

Atmospheric oxygen levels rose steadily rising from the Neoproterozoic due to the increase in photosynthesising organisms. Cambrian levels varied between c. 3% and 14% (present day levels are c. 21%). Low levels of atmospheric oxygen and the warm climate resulted in lower dissolved oxygen concentrations in marine waters and widespread anoxia in deep ocean waters.

== Geochemistry ==
During the Cambrian, variations in isotope ratios were more frequent and more pronounced than later in the Phanerozoic, with at least 10 carbon isotope (δ^{13}C) excursions (significant variations in global isotope ratios) recognised. These excursions record changes in the biogeochemistry of the oceans and atmosphere, which are due to processes such as the global rates of continental arc magmatism, rates of weathering and nutrients levels entering the marine environment, sea level changes, and biological factors including the impact of burrowing fauna on oxygen levels.

=== Isotope excursions ===
==== Base of Cambrian ====
The basal Cambrian δ^{13}C excursion (BACE), together with low δ^{238}U and raised δ^{34}S indicates a period of widespread shallow marine anoxia, which occurs at the same time as the extinction of the Ediacaran acritarchs. It was followed by the rapid appearance and diversification of bilaterian animals.

==== Cambrian Stages 2 and 3 ====
During the early Cambrian, ^{87}Sr/^{86}Sr rose in response to enhanced continental weathering. This increased the input of nutrients into the oceans and led to higher burial rates of organic matter. Over long timescales, the extra oxygen released by organic carbon burial is balanced by a decrease in the rates of pyrite (FeS_{2}) burial (a process which also releases oxygen), leading to stable levels of oxygen in the atmosphere. However, during the early Cambrian, a series of linked δ^{13}C and δ^{34}S excursions indicate high burial rates of both organic carbon and pyrite in biologically productive yet anoxic ocean floor waters. The oxygen-rich waters produced by these processes spread from the deep ocean into shallow marine environments, extending the habitable regions of the seafloor. These pulses of oxygen are associated with the radiation of the small shelly fossils and the Cambrian arthropod radiation isotope excursion (CARE). The increase in oxygenated waters in the deep ocean ultimately reduced the levels of organic carbon and pyrite burial, leading to a decrease in oxygen production and the re-establishment of anoxic conditions. This cycle was repeated several times during the early Cambrian.

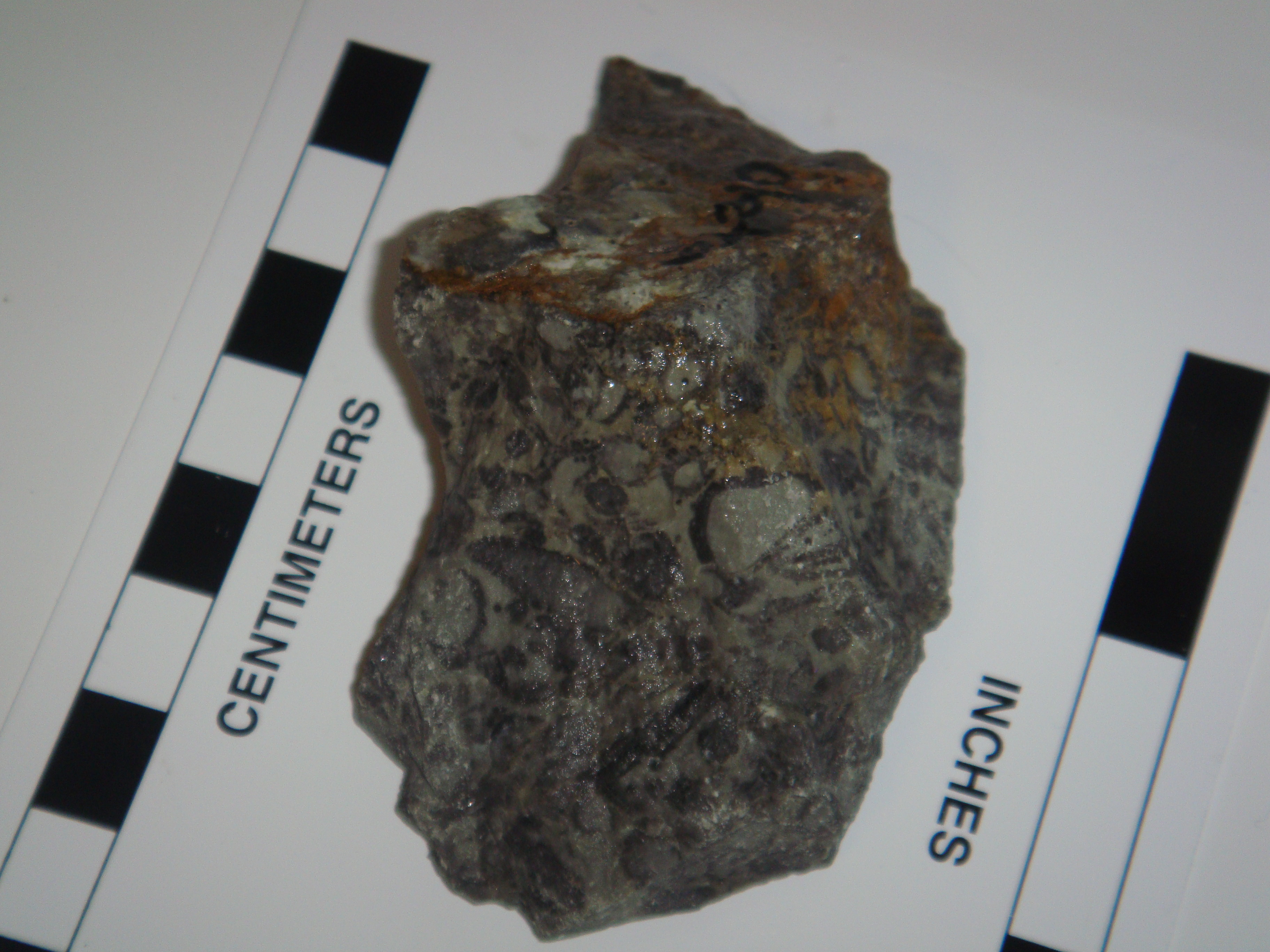
Archeocyathids from the Poleta formation in the Death Valley area

==== Cambrian Stage 4 to early Miaolingian ====
The beginning of the eruptions of the Kalkarindji LIP basalts during Stage 4 and the early Miaolingian released large quantities of carbon dioxide, methane and sulphur dioxide into the atmosphere. The changes these wrought are reflected by three large and rapid δ^{13}C excursions. Increased temperatures led to a global sea level rise that flooded continental shelves and interiors with anoxic waters from the deeper ocean and drowned carbonate platforms of archaeocyathan reefs, resulting in the widespread accumulation of black organic-rich shales. Known as the Sinsk anoxic extinction event, this triggered the first major extinction of the Phanerozoic, the 513–508 Ma Botomian–Toyonian Extinction (BTE), which included the loss of the archaeocyathids and hyoliths and saw a major drop in biodiversity. The rise in sea levels is also evidenced by a global decrease in ^{87}Sr/^{86}Sr. The flooding of continental areas decreased the rates of continental weathering, reducing the input of ^{87}Sr to the oceans and lowering the ^{87}Sr/^{86}Sr of seawater.

The base of the Miaolingian is marked by the Redlichiid–Olenellid extinction carbon isotope event (ROECE), which coincides with the main phase of Kalkarindji volcanism.

During the Miaolingian, orogenic events along the Australian–Antarctic margin of Gondwana led to an increase in weathering and an influx of nutrients into the ocean, raising the level of productivity and organic carbon burial. These can be seen in the steady increase in ^{87}Sr/^{86}Sr and δ^{13}C.

==== Early Furongian ====
Continued erosion of the deeper levels of the Gondwanan mountain belts led to a peak in ^{87}Sr/^{86}Sr and linked positive δ^{13}C and δ^{34}S excursions, known as the Steptoean positive carbon isotope excursion (SPICE). This indicates similar geochemical conditions to Stages 2 and 3 of the early Cambrian existed, with the expansion of seafloor anoxia enhancing the burial rates of organic matter and pyrite. This increase in the extent of anoxic seafloor conditions led to the extinction of the marjumiid and damesellid trilobites, whilst the increase in oxygen levels that followed helped drive the radiation of plankton.

^{87}Sr/^{86}Sr fell sharply near the top of the Jiangshanian Stage, and through Stage 10 as the Gondwanan mountains were eroded down and rates of weathering decreased.

=== Magnesium/calcium isotope ratios in seawater ===
The mineralogy of inorganic marine carbonates has varied through the Phanerozoic, controlled by the Mg^{2+}/Ca^{2+} values of seawater. High Mg^{2+}/Ca^{2+} result in calcium carbonate precipitation dominated by aragonite and high-magnesium calcite, known as aragonite seas, and low ratios result in calcite seas where low-magnesium calcite is the primary calcium carbonate precipitate. The shells and skeletons of biomineralising organisms reflect the dominant form of calcite.

During the late Ediacaran to early Cambrian increasing oxygen levels led to a decrease in ocean acidity and an increase in the concentration of calcium in sea water. However, there was not a simple transition from aragonite to calcite seas, rather a protracted and variable change through the Cambrian. Aragonite and high-magnesium precipitation continued from the Ediacaran into Cambrian Stage 2. Low-magnesium calcite skeletal hard parts appear in Cambrian Age 2, but inorganic precipitation of aragonite also occurred at this time. Mixed aragonite–calcite seas continued through the middle and late Cambrian, with fully calcite seas not established until the early Ordovician.

These variations and slow decrease in Mg^{2+}/Ca^{2+} of seawater were due to low oxygen levels, high continental weathering rates and the geochemistry of the Cambrian seas. In conditions of low oxygen and high iron levels, iron substitutes for magnesium in authigenic clay minerals deposited on the ocean floor, slowing the removal rates of magnesium from seawater. The enrichment of ocean waters in silica, prior to the radiation of siliceous organisms, and the limited bioturbation of the anoxic ocean floor increased the rates of deposition, relative to the rest of the Phanerozoic, of these clays. This, together with the high input of magnesium into the oceans via enhanced continental weathering, delayed the reduction in Mg^{2+}/Ca^{2+} and facilitated continued aragonite precipitation.

The conditions that favoured the deposition of authigenic clays were also ideal for the formation of lagerstätten, with the minerals in the clays replacing the soft body parts of Cambrian organisms.

== Flora ==
The Cambrian flora was little different from the Ediacaran. The principal taxa were the marine macroalgae Fuxianospira, Sinocylindra, and Marpolia. No calcareous macroalgae are known from the period.

No land plant (embryophyte) fossils are known from the Cambrian. However, biofilms and microbial mats were well developed on Cambrian tidal flats and beaches 500 mya, and microbes forming microbial Earth ecosystems, comparable with modern soil crust of desert regions, contributing to soil formation. Although molecular clock estimates suggest terrestrial plants may have first emerged during the Middle or Late Cambrian, the consequent large-scale removal of the greenhouse gas CO_{2} from the atmosphere through sequestration did not begin until the Ordovician.

Land plants may have emerged during the Cambrian, but the evidence for this is fragmentary and contested and the oldest unamibiguous evidence for land plants is from the following Ordovician. Molecular clock estimates have also led some authors to suggest that arthropods colonised land during the Cambrian, but again the earliest physical evidence of this is during the following Ordovician.

== Oceanic life ==
Life timeline
| ← / Earth formed; ← / Earliest water; ← / LUCA; ← / Earliest fossils; ← / Great Oxygenation Event; ← / Sexual reproduction; ← / Earliest fungi; ← / Neoproterozoic oxygenation event; ← / Ediacaran biota; ← / Cambrian explosion; ← / Earliest tetrapods; ← / Earliest hominoid |
(million years ago)

The early Cambrian was a period of rapid evolution, known as the Cambrian Explosion, which saw the appearance of animals with biomineralised skeletons, the development of increasing complex animal morphology, behaviour and lifestyles, changes in the sea floor substrate with the advent of burrowing, and the opening up of new biodiverse ecosystems. Beginning at the Ediacaran–Cambrian boundary when early representatives of the major animal phyla appear in the fossil record, pulses of radiations and extinctions continued through the Cambrian and by the end of the Period all Bilateria classes are present.

The conditions that facilitated this rapid expansion were the result of a complex relationship between oxygen levels, the biogeochemistry of ocean waters, and the evolution of life. Newly evolved burrowing organisms exposed anoxic sediments to the overlying oxygenated seawater. This bioturbation decreased the burial rates of organic carbon and sulphur, which over time reduced atmospheric and oceanic oxygen levels, leading to widespread anoxic conditions. Periods of higher rates of continental weathering led to increased delivery of nutrients to the oceans, boosting productivity of phytoplankton and stimulating metazoan evolution. However, rapid increases in nutrient supply led to eutrophication, where rapid growth in phytoplankton numbers result in the depletion of oxygen in the surrounding waters.

Pulses of increased oxygen levels are linked to increased biodiversity; raised oxygen levels supported the increasing metabolic demands of organisms, and increased ecological niches by expanding habitable areas of seafloor. Conversely, incursions of oxygen-deficient water, due to changes in sea level, ocean circulation, upwellings from deeper waters and/or biological productivity, produced anoxic conditions that limited habitable areas, reduced ecological niches and resulted in extinction events both regional and global.

Overall, these dynamic, fluctuating environments, with global and regional anoxic incursions resulting in extinction events, and periods of increased oceanic oxygenation stimulating biodiversity, drove evolutionary innovation.

Many modes of preservation are unique to the Cambrian, and some preserve soft body parts, resulting in an abundance of Lagerstätten. These include Sirius Passet, the Sinsk Algal Lens, the Maotianshan Shales, the Emu Bay Shale, and the Burgess Shale.

=== Porifera, Cnidaria and Ctenophora ===
Porifera (sponges), Cnidaria (e.g. jellyfish, Hydrozoa, sea anemones and corals) and Ctenophora (comb jellies) have an uneven fossil record in the Cambrian and are best preserved in Lagerstätten. Their evolutionary relationships are the subject of ongoing debate. Prior to about 513 Ma both stem and crown groups were present, however, many stem groups went extinct during the Sinsk anoxic event at the end of Series 2, with crown groups diversifying afterwards.

==== Porifera ====
Porifera are divided into three main groups: Calcarea (calcareous sponges), Hexactinellida (silica or glass sponges), and Demospongia (spongin and/or silica sponges). Demospongia are most common in the Cambrian fossil record, Hexactiniellida and Calcarea may be present but the evidence is contested, as is evidence of Ediacaran sponges. Many Cambrian sponge groups (e.g. Reticulosa, Heteractinida and Protomonaxonida) are considered stem-groups of these major sponge lineages as they have sponge-like features, but the groups themselves are extinct. For example, Eiffelia (a heteractinid) has features of calcareous and siliceous sponges with spicules of both silica and calcium carbonate.

Archaeocyatha are probably related to demosponges. They first appear in the fossil record in Stage 2 of the Terreneuvian, rapidly diversifying during Stage 3 of Series 2, before going into a sharp decline during Stage 4 and going extinct during the Sinsk anoxic event. Archaeocyatha were sessile, suspension feeders that pumped water through their porous cup-shaped calcareous skeletons. Together with cyanobacteria, they were the primary reef builders in the early Cambrian, constructing the oldest known large-scale structures built by animals. The presence of cyanobacteria within the skeletal framework of Archaeocyatha suggests a photosymbiotic relationship. Cyanobacteria and other calcimicrobes precipitated calcium carbonate, which encrusted Archaeocyatha skeletons, binding them together to form the framework of the reef. Early coral-like anthozoans (cnidarians) also contributed to reef building. These died out together with Archaeocyatha during the Sinsk anoxic event. They were replaced by lithistid demosponges as the principal reef building sponges for the rest of the Cambrian.

==== Ctenophora ====
Life restoration of Fasciculus, a free living early ctenophore

Ctenophora (comb jellies) are a group of pelagic, predatory animals with gelatinous, globular bodies, and comb rows (external cilia) which are used for propulsion. The oldest undisputed ctenophore fossils are found in the lower Cambrian. Cambrian ctenophores had more comb rows, but lack paired tentacles with colloblasts, which modern ctenophores use for feeding. Stem group Ctenophora include Scleroctenophora, which had paired comb rows, and organic skeleton something modern ctenophores lack.

Dinomischids were polyp-like, sessile filter feeders with organic skeletons that collected food via a crown of tentacles around their mouths. These have been assigned to both Ctenophora with the suggestion the tentacles evolved into comb rows, and Cnidaria because the internal structures more closely resemble those of a sea anemone-like ancestor.

==== Cnidaria ====
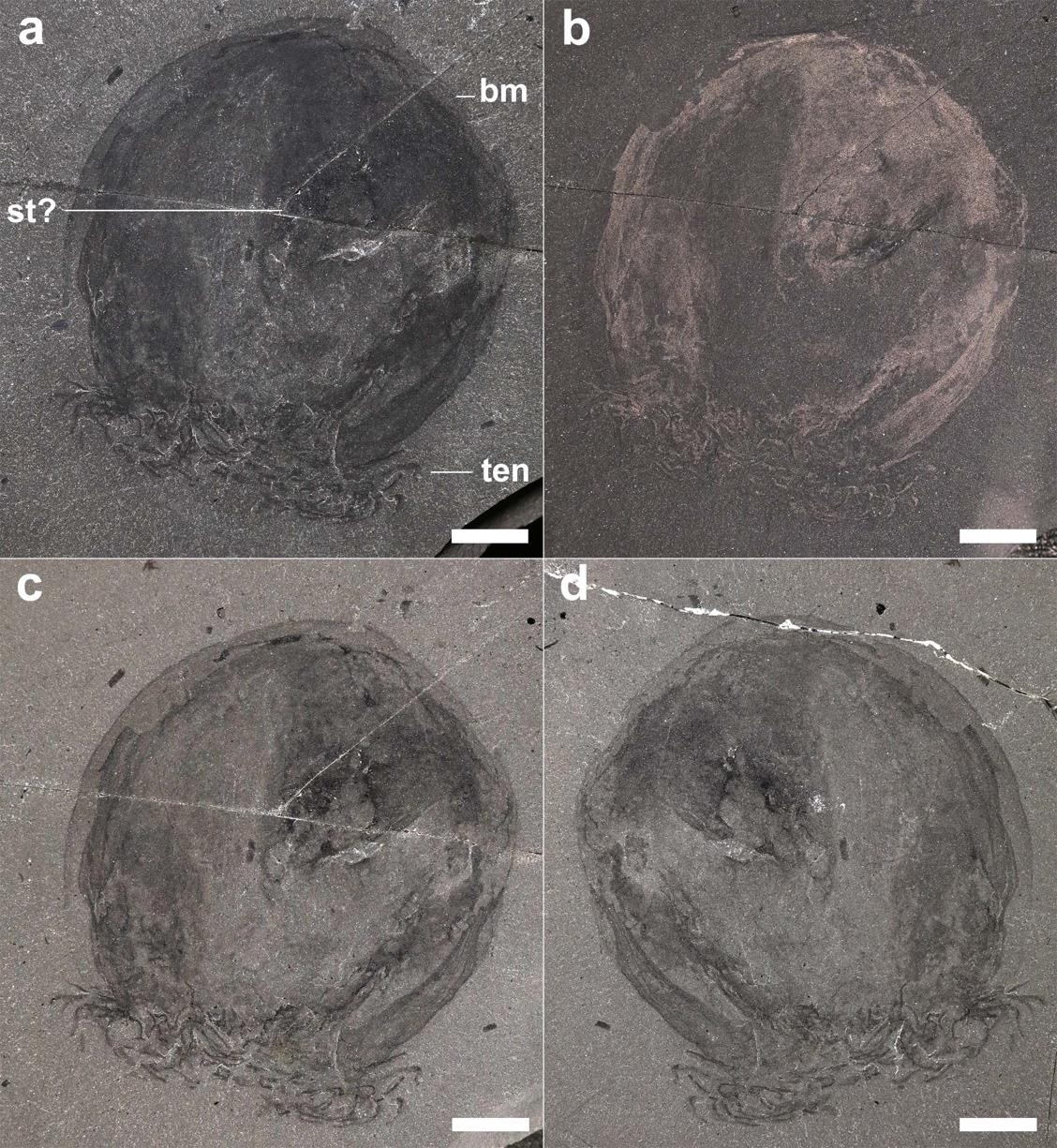
Fossils of Burgessomedusa, an early jellyfish known from the Burgess Shale

Cnidarians are divided into two main classes; Anthozoa (sea anemones, corals), which are benthic polyps, and Medusozoa (hydroids, jellyfishes), which have alternating life cycle stages of polyps and medusae (free swimming). The oldest example of a jellyfish in the fossil record is Olivooides an embryonic jellyfish from the Fortunian. Examples of anthozoans are found from Series 2. One of these, the polyp-like Nailiana elegans was a stem-group anthozoan. Its long, flexible tentacles were used to detect, grasp, and drag prey into its mouth in a similar manner to modern predatory sea anemones. A fossil specimen from Stage 3 (c. 520 Ma) shows the earliest known evidence of this macrophagous style of predation. The fossil preserves a brachiopod surrounded by the N. elegans' tentacles with part of the brachiopod already within the cnidarian.

=== Lophotrochozoa ===
Lophotrochozoa is a clade of protostomes that includes brachiopods, molluscs and annelids. Stem group brachiopods and molluscs appear from the Ediacaran-Cambrian boundary, and crown group species are found from the Fortunian. Many stem groups go extinct during the anoxic Sinsk Event (c. 513 Ma), while the crown-group species show only a minimal drop in numbers before diversifying again.

==== Annelida ====
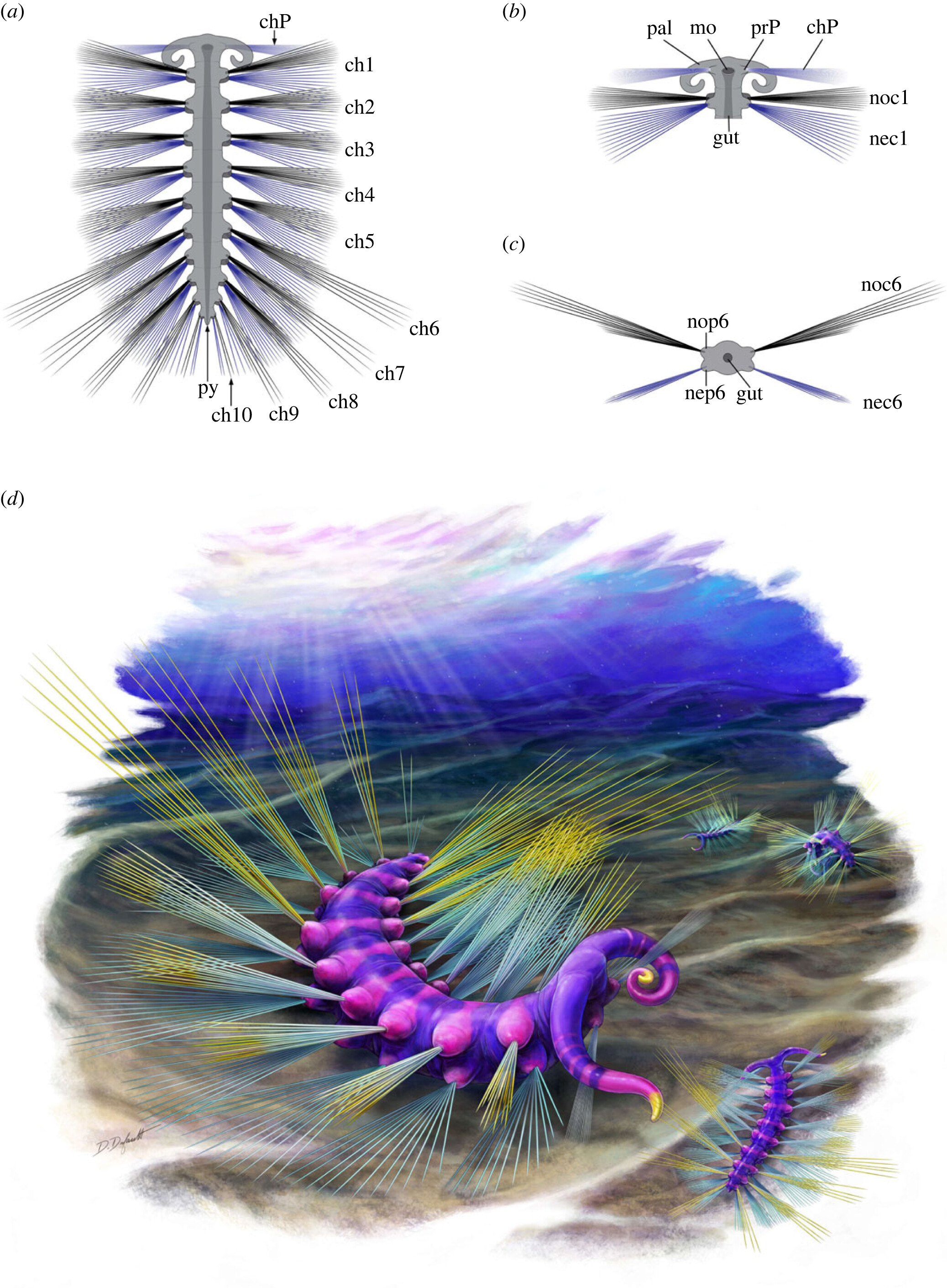
Diagram and life restoration of Ursactis, an early polychaete known from the Burgess Shale

Annelids are segmented worms. Whole body fossils are found from about 535 Ma. Cambrian annelids are polychaetes (bristle worms). They had pairs of lateral outgrowths from each body segment, known as parapodia, that split into lobes. These parapodia were covered in chaetae (bristles), which were used for locomotion and potentially defence. They had a pair of palps that extended from their heads, which were sensory or used in feeding.

Cambrian annelids had varied morphologies, reflecting their diverse lifestyles. Many were epibenthic, crawling over the sea floor, such as Ursactis, which used its long palps to sweep food towards its mouth. With only thin chaetae and no jaw it would not have been able to catch prey but rather fed on detritus on the sea floor. Dannychaeta lived in thin organic tubes within the sediment extending its long palps to feed in the water above. Zhangjiagoivermis, with its long parapodia, suggesting a swimming lifestyle, is the earliest known semi-pelagic annelid, and Xiaoshibachaeta which had an elongate body and an elliptical head with the chaetae and front parapodia extending back over the head in a protective cage may be the first burrowing annelid.

Fossils of Ursactis have been found in large clusters. Such high density communities indirectly indicate rich food sources were available on the seafloor. Annelid and enteropneust worms have been found preserved together within tubes built by the enteropneusts. This is an early example of commensalism as, whilst the annelids would have benefited from the protection provided by the tube, there is no clear benefit for the tube building enteropneust.

==== Brachiopoda ====
Brachiopods and bryozoa are Lophophorata, a clade within Lophotrochozoa, with lophophores; a feeding organ composed of tentacles with cilia that surrounds the mouth.

Early lophophorates include the tommotiids and hyoliths, which are found from the Fortunian in small shelly fauna (SSF) assemblages. Tommotiids are stem-brachiopods with armoured scleritomes (exoskeletons) formed from fused organophosphate sclerites (hard plates). Some, like Micrina, had brachiopod-like shells, whilst others used sclerites to build dwelling tubes. Unlike most lophophorates, camenellan tommotiids were mobile. They were segmented worm-like animals with chaetae that lived on the sea floor, similar to the early annelids, suggesting the camenellans are the most basal members of the Lophophorata.

Hyoliths had a conical shell with a lid-like operculum across its opening. Most commonly considered an early Lophophorata, they have also been interpreted as basal members of the lophotrochozoans or early Mollusca.

The earliest brachiopods appeared in Stage 2. They diversified rapidly, developing different lifestyles, and spreading across all the major continental blocks within 20 million years. Their life cycle may have involved a free-swimming planktotrophic (plankton eating) larval stage allowing widespread dispersal through the oceans. Early linguliforms had long, thin pedicles (fleshy stalks) that attached to hard substrates with their shells extending like kites above the seafloor. Some species, such as the Diadongia pista, and the stem group Yuganotheca elegans had a pedicle with a bulb-like end that was buried entirely in soft sediment with only their shell exposed at the surface. Whilst most brachiopods attached to fixed substrates, a fossil of Nisusia burgessensis has been found attached to the scleritome of a Wiwaxia. This is the oldest example in the fossil record of a commensal relationship where a sessile organism has fixed on to a mobile organism. The advantage for the nisusiid would have been protection and an improved food supply as the Wiwaxia moved across the seafloor. The drawback was a shorter lifespan as Wiwaxia shed their scleritome as they grew.

==== Bryozoa ====
The earliest bryozoa in the fossil record are found in Stage 3. Two genera are recognised: Protomelission gatehousei and Dayingomelission hexaclitia. They formed colonies of zooids each living within individual hexagonal cystids (exoskeletons). P. gatehousei colonies formed upright structures with two curved sheets of zooids arranged back to back anchored to the substrate. D. hexaclitia colonies were single sheets which grew across the sea floor. These bryozoans lived in shallow seas often as part of archaeocyath reefs.

==== Mollusca ====
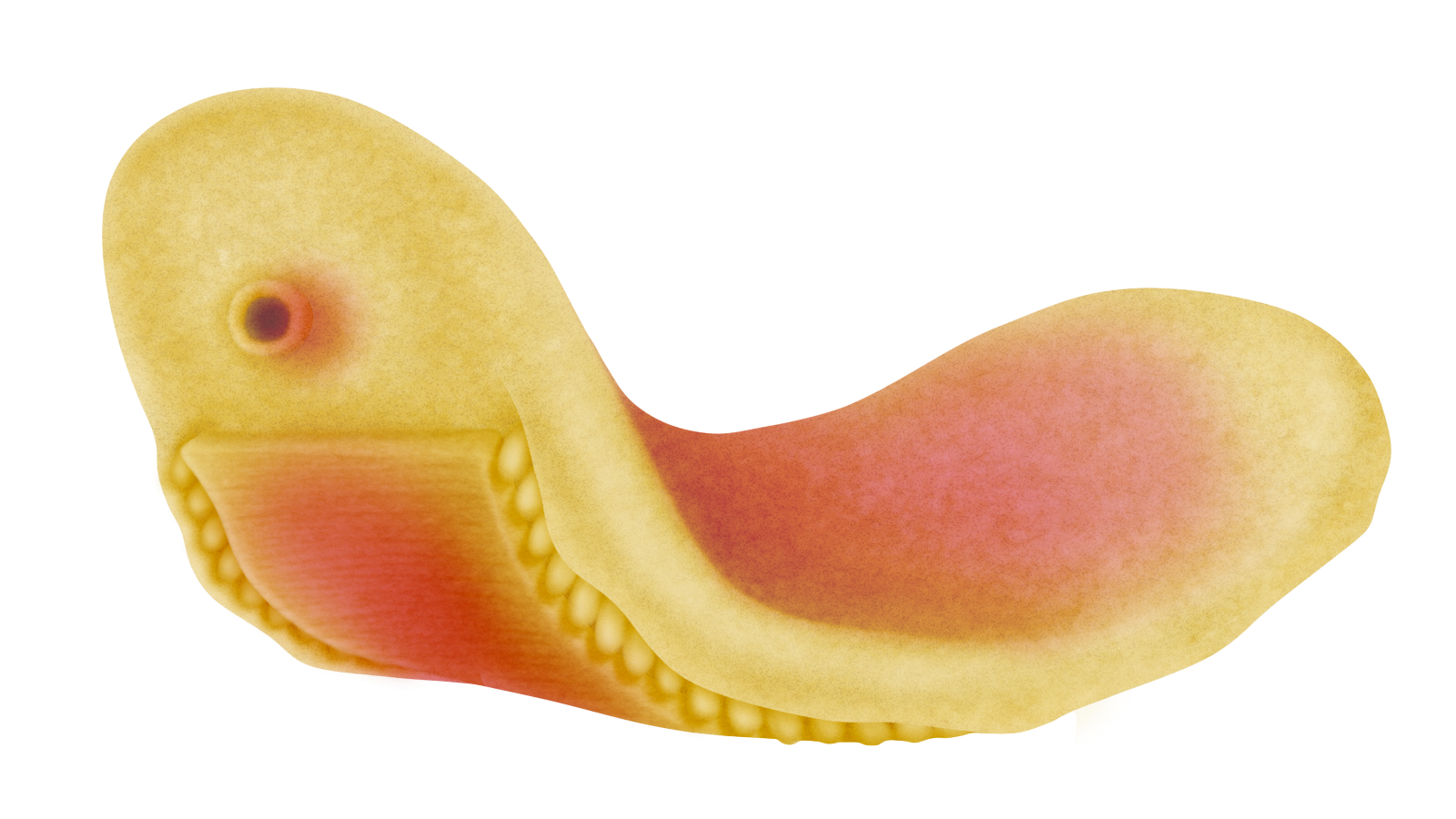
Life restoration of Odontogriphus, an early mollusc known from the Burgess Shale

Molluscs appeared and diversified early in the Cambrian and by Stage 2 (c. 529 Ma) were established globally. Early molluscs include the maikhanellids, and helcionelloids found in SSF assemblages. Maikhanellids are stem-Mollusca. Their cap-shaped shells were less than 2mm long and 1mm high, with a smooth apex surrounded by overlapping sclerites in scale- or grid-like patterns. In contrast, helcionelloids (stem-Conchifera) had coiled conical shells which vary from curved to hook-like in appearance. Other molluscs in SSF assemblages include the pelagiellids and aldanellids, which may be early gastropods, although their exact phylogenetic position is disputed.

The halkieriids (stem-Aculifera), appeared in the late Fortunian. The best known, Halkieria evangelista, was a slug-like animal up to 8 cm long covered in a chain mail-style armour formed from hundreds small pointed sclerites across its back and larger plates front and rear.

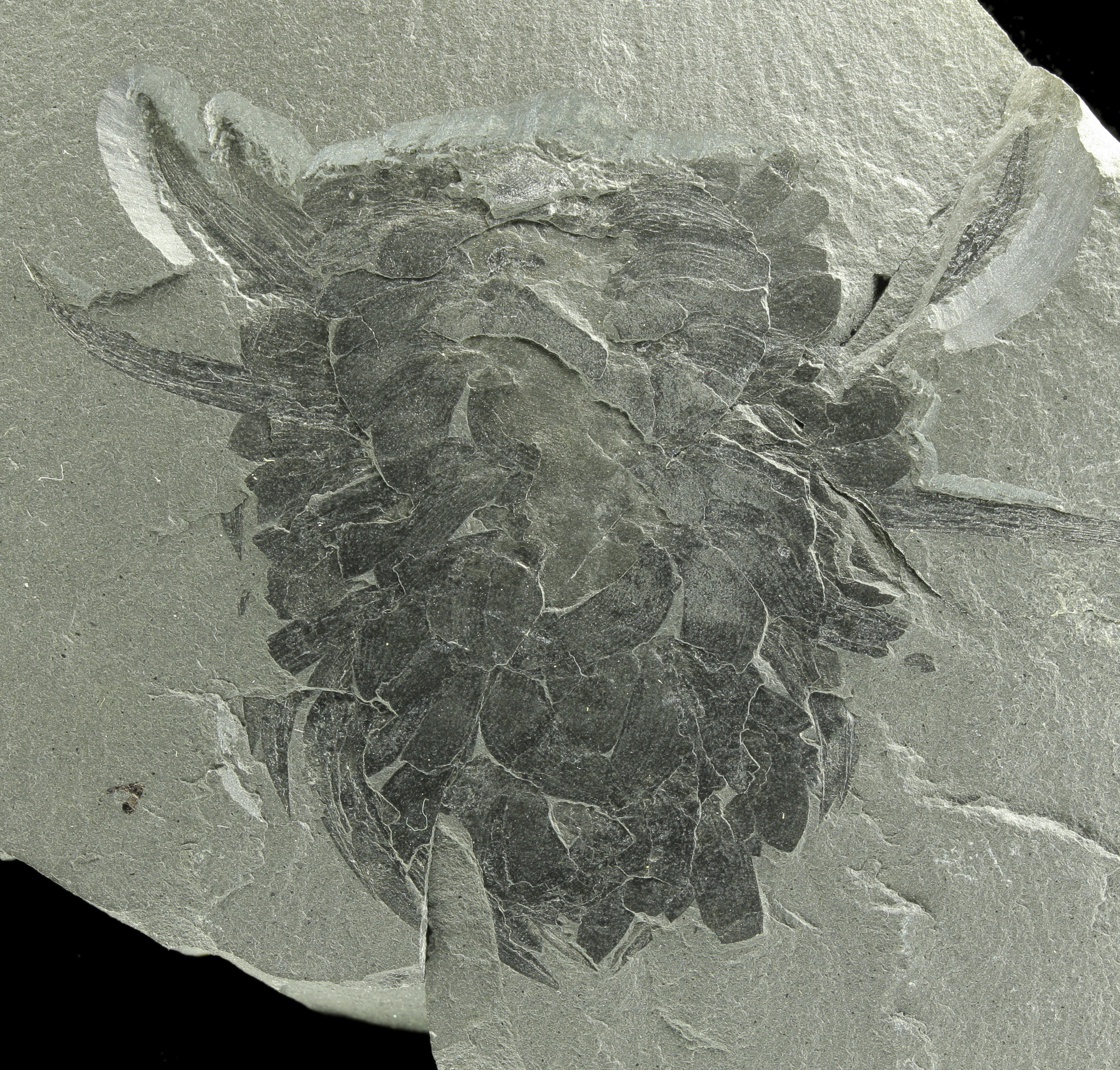
Wiwaxia corrugata from the Burgess Shale.

Another slug-like animal was Wiwaxia, a stem-mollusc. It also appeared in Stage 3 before spreading into a variety of environments world-wide between Stage 4 and the Drumian. It had a flexible armour of leaf-shaped sclerites across its sides and back, which was shed and replaced as the animal grew. Wiwaxia reached about 5 cm at adulthood when long spines developed along each side of its back. A foot extended along most of its underside, and it had a radula-like mouthpart with rows of teeth for scraping soft surfaces. It crept across the sea floor grazing on algal mats and sweeping up food. Odontogriphus, another stem-mollusc, had a very similar morphology to Wiwaxia, but lacked a scleritome.

Bivalvia and Scaphopoda (tusk shells) lineage split about 520 Ma. Early bivalves include the shallow burrowers Pojetaia and Fordilla. The earliest known stem-cephalopod is Eoceras, from the Stage 3. Its cone-shaped, mm-scale shell had a segmented tube similar to a siphuncle running through the septa; a feature that allows modern cephalopods to control their buoyancy.

By the middle Cambrian most modern Mollusca groups are present in the fossil record, including gastropods, bivalves, cephalopods, and monoplacophorans. Polyplacophorans appear in the late Cambrian.

=== Ecdysozoa ===
Ecdysozoa is a clade of protostomes that periodically moult their hardened exoskeletons. During the Cambrian diverse arthropods, lobopodians and early priapulid worms were important members of the marine ecosystem and in the case of arthropods even ventured on to land.

==== Lobopodia ====
Lobopodia includes stem groups of both Arthropoda and Onychophora. They varied widely in shape and size but all followed the same basic plan of a worm-like body with short unjointed limbs, known as lobopods, tipped with sickle-like claws. Lobopodians were probably the first animals to be able to walk across the seafloor and their claws would have enabled them to climb across obstacles such as sponges and carcasses.

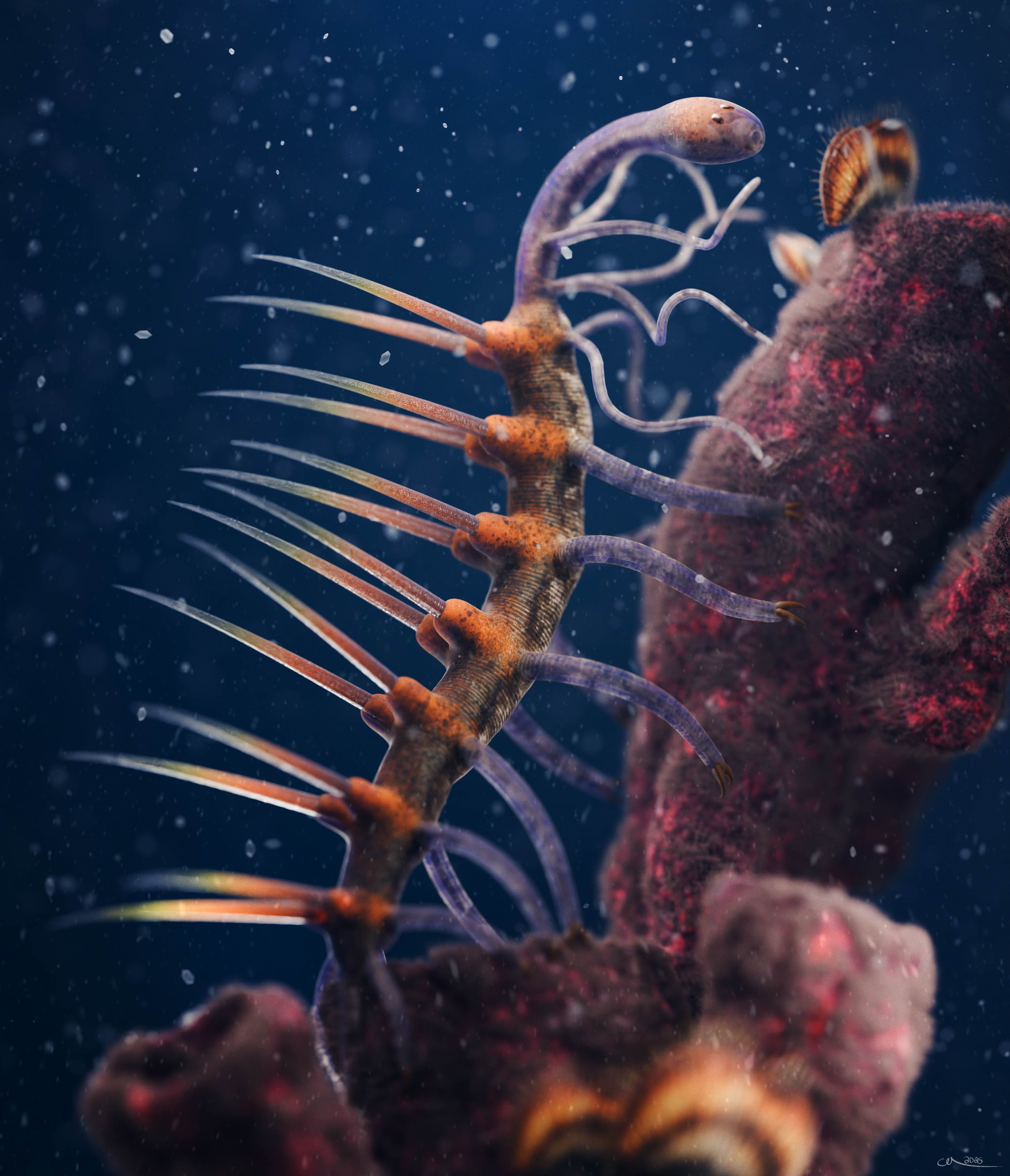
Restoration of Hallucigenia sparsa

Microdictyon was coated in a network of hard plates and Onychodictyon had claw-like plates along its back. Jianshanopodia and Megadictyon grew up to 20cm in length and had a pair of head appendages used for grasping and eating prey. Some like Kerygmachela and Pambdelurion had long spines on their heads and segmented flaps with gills for swimming in addition to lobopods.

Hallucigenia was a detritus feeder that grew up to 3 cm long. It had a small head and a neck with three pairs of appendages that were clawless, flexible and long enough to reach its forward-facing mouth. Along its underside were seven pairs of lobopods and along its back were seven pairs of long rigid spines.

Opabinia was one of the most advanced lobopodians with similar features to the early arthropods. It had five compound eyes on short stalks, a long proboscis which terminated in a claw with spines. This was used for grasping food and transferring it to its backward facing mouth. Its side flaps with gills and tail fan were adapted for swimming.

==== Arthropoda ====
Arthropods have a chitinous or biomineralised exoskeleton, a segmented body, pairs of jointed appendages, and specialised head appendages. Cambrian arthropods include the stem groups Lobopodia and Radiodonta, Artiopoda (trilobites), Myriapoda and Pancrustacea.

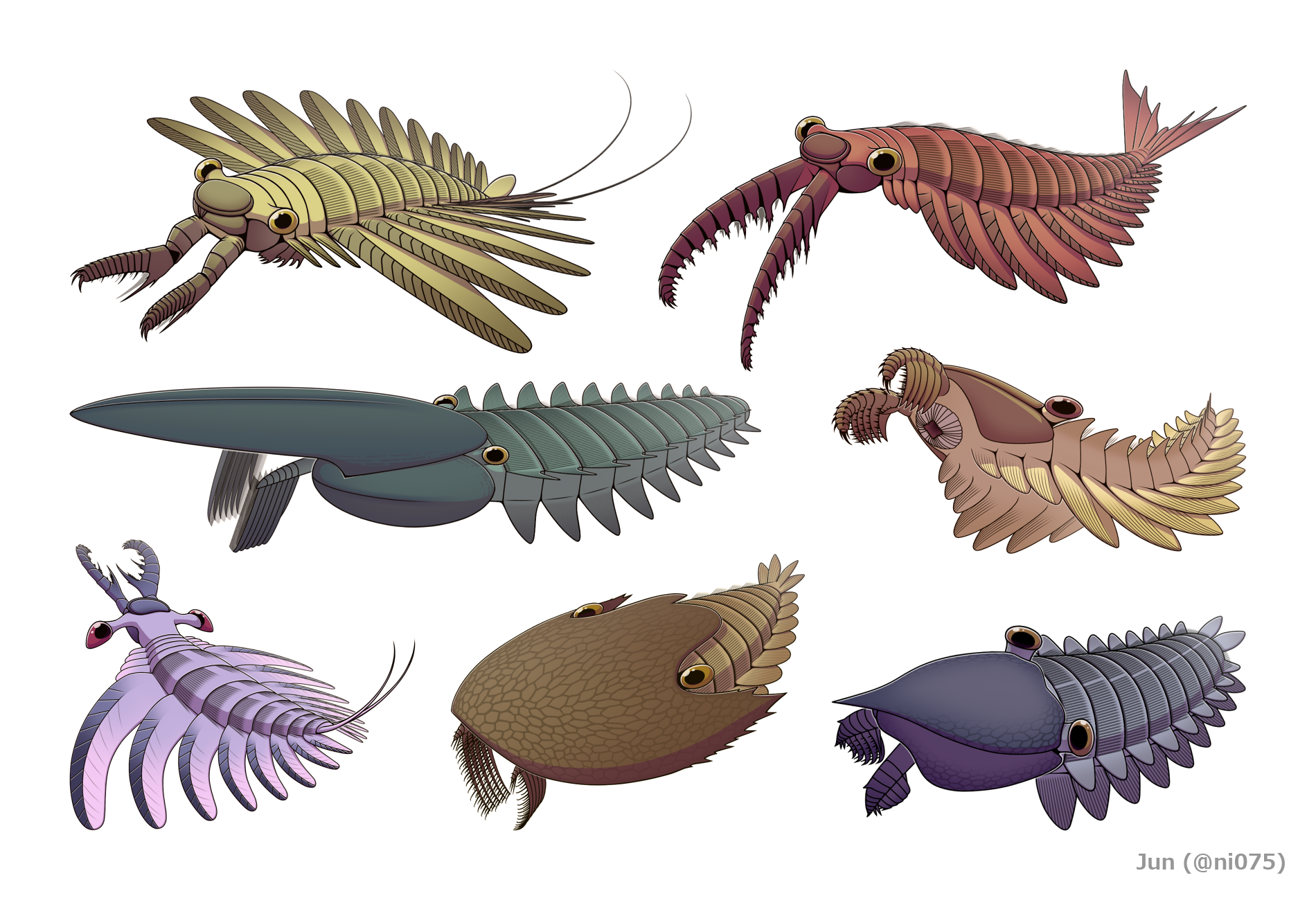
Radiodonts (various members depicted) were diverse, widespread and some of the largest animals of the Cambrian period

Found from Cambrian Stage 3, Radiodonta is characterised by a pair of frontal appendages, which, unlike the lobodopians it evolved from, were composed of sclerotised segments similar to those of the arthropods. Radiodontans had a pair of well-developed compound eyes on stalks, paired flaps along the soft body for swimming and a circular mouth beneath the head composed of hardened plates. The radiodontan Anomalocaris grew up to 2m long and was the largest animal in the Cambrian seas. Its pair of frontal appendages were composed of twelve segments with barbs at the joints that could coil to grip prey, and the inner surface of its mouth was lined with serrated spikes. While its prey included trilobites it was not strong enough to crush their tough carapaces. Instead, it may have twisted them open or used its appendages for sifting through the sediment for food.

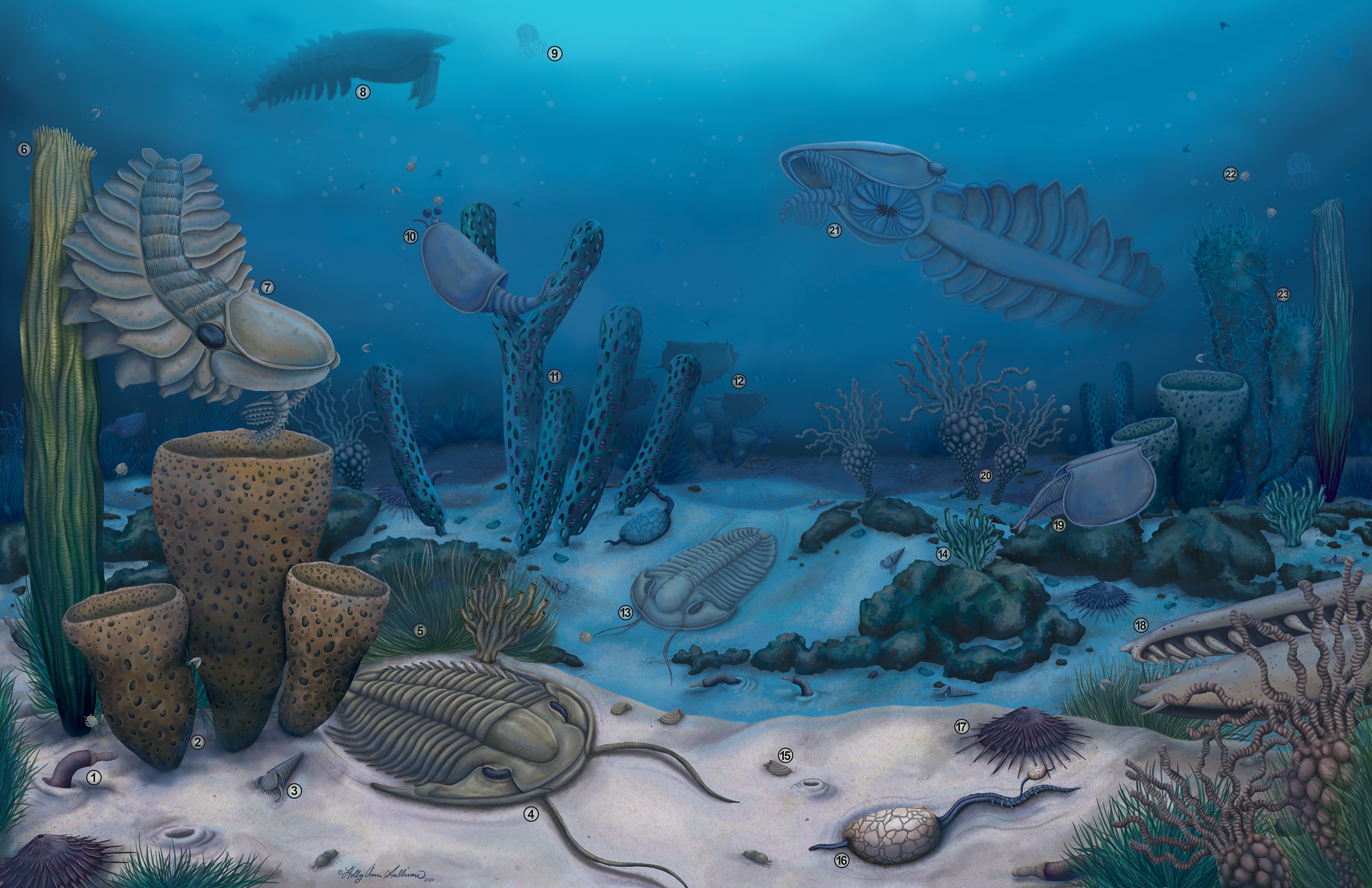
Artistic reconstruction of Marjum biota, including various arthropods (trilobites, hymenocarines, and radiodonts), sponges, echinoderms, and various other groups

The earliest claimed evidence for trilobites in the fossil record is from trace fossils such as Rusophycus and Cruziana, which are found from c. 537 in the early Terreneuvian. Body fossils do not appear until the base of Series 2 c. 521 Ma, as trilobites developed biomineralised calcitic exoskeletons, and a number of authors have argued that trilobites originated shortly before their appearance in the fossil record. Trilobites had four or five pairs of appendages under the cephalon (head), one for each thorax segment and more beneath pygidium (rear section). These appendages were split into two branches, an inner, segmented walking branch and an outer, thinner feathered gill branch. They had a pair of slender, flexible antennae that extended from the cephalon, which, depending on the species, had different functions such as grabbing and manipulating prey, sensing the environment, or for digging through sediment. Most trilobites had compound eyes indicating they lived within the photic zone. Some, such as Ellipsocephalus, lost their eyes as they adapted to a deep sea or burrowing lifestyle.

Early members of Mandibulata, the modern arthropod group including myriapods (millipedes and centipedes, among others) and pancrustaceans (crustaceans and insects, among others) known from the Cambrian include Fuxianhuiida, Euthycarcinoidea and Hymenocarina. Euthycarcinoids are likely to be stem-myriapods. They grew up to 50 cm long and were probably the first animals to walk on land. They were aquatic arthropods, but left trackways, preserved as the trace fossil Protichnites, in tidal flats and nearshore sediments. Fossils of the oldest euthycarcinoid, Mosineia have been found associated with these trackways. They may have come on to land to graze on the abundant algae mats that grew on the coastal mudflats, to move between shallow lagoons, or possibly to lay their eggs. Modern pancrustaceans likely had already appeared in the fossil record by 517 Ma, as indicated by Sunella, suggested to represent an early relative of ostracods, though the fossil record of crustaceans throughout much of the Cambrian is sparse, despite their apparent early diversification.

The earliest unambiguous stem-chelicerates (the group which contains modern arachnids, horseshoe crabs and sea spiders), such as the habeliids, mollisoniids and Urokodia, had emerged by c. 517 mya, with the earliest true chelicerae-bearing arthropod, Megachelicerax, known from around 500 mya. The controversial megacheirans may also represent relatives of chelicerates, though this has been disputed.

==== Priapulida ====
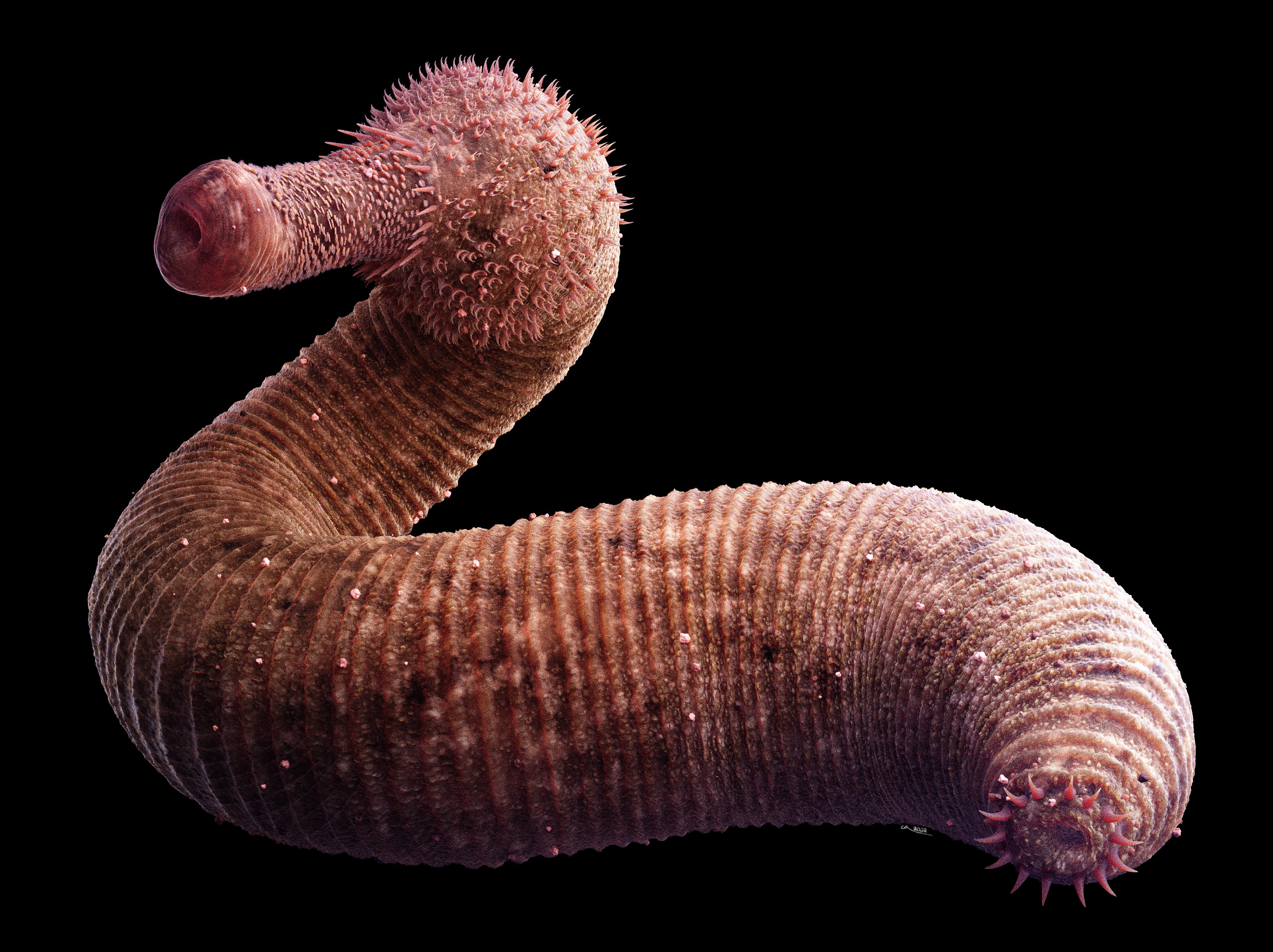
Life restoration of Ottoia, a Cambrian stem-prilapulid

Early priapulidan worms were among the first burrowers and bioturbators of the seafloor sediments and so played an important role in changing the marine environment. Evidence of their burrowing habits comes from trace fossils, including Treptichnus pedum that defines the base of the Cambrian. This consists of a main horizontal burrow with short branches that slope up towards the surface of the seafloor. Another trace fossil attributed to priapulids is Skolithos linearis (pipe rock), which is found globally in nearshore sandstones. One of the most common of the stem-priapulids was Ottoia. Like other priapulids its trunk and bulbous introvert (front section of the body) were covered in chitinous scalids (hooks and spines) and its pharynx, which could be pushed out through the mouth, was lined with rings of teeth. It could grow to over 8 cm long, and was an ambush predator striking at prey from its burrow. The remains of hyolithids and small trilobites have been found in their guts.

=== Deuterostomia ===
The clade Deuterostomia comprises three phyla, all of which had representatives in the Cambrian: Chordata (including Vertebrata); Echinodermata; and Hemichordata (Pterobranchia and Enteropneusta).

==== Chordata ====
Chordates diversified during the Cambrian, including members of the modern groups Tunicata, and Vertebrata.

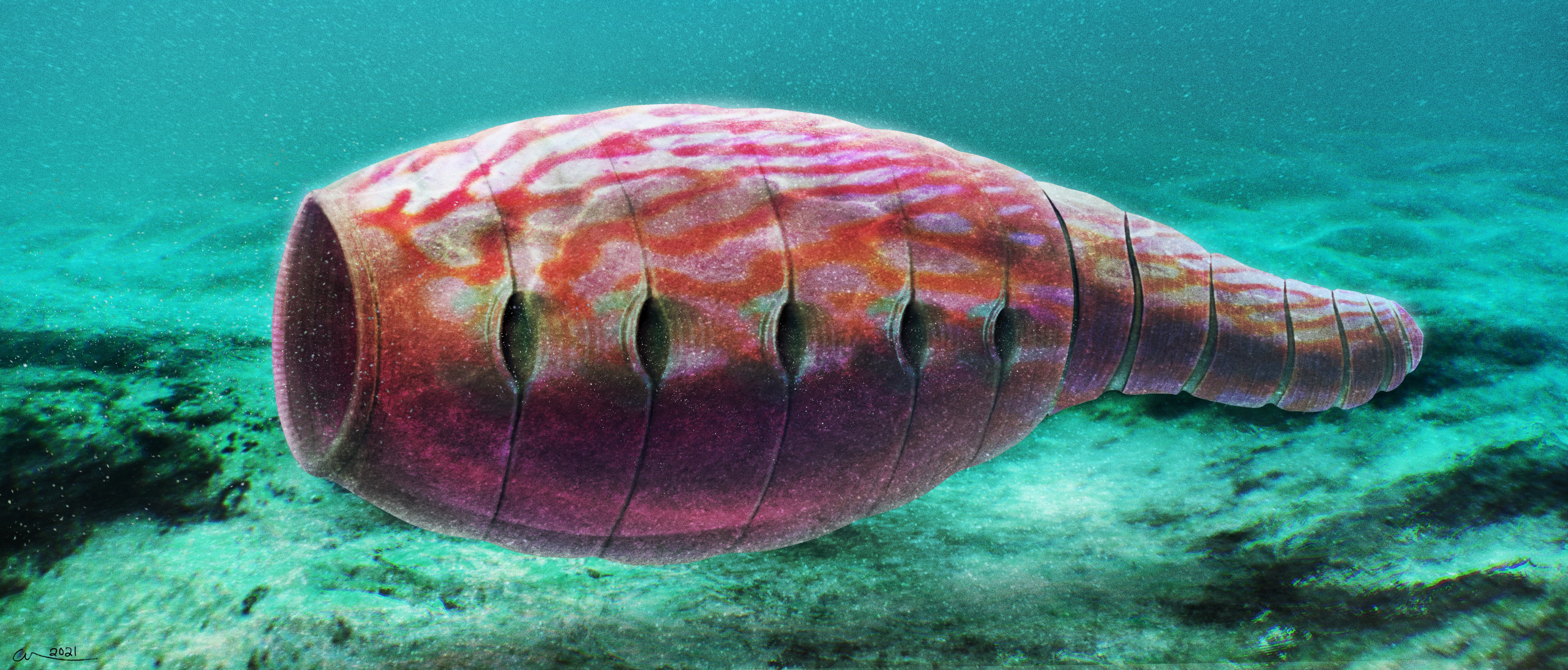
Restoration of Yuyuanozoon, a vetucolian

Vetulicolians are the most primitive stem-chordates. Their bodies consisted of an anterior section with the pharynx, and thinner, often segmented, posterior section with the anus at the end (unlike chordates which have a post-anal tail). They filled the ecological niche of medium-large, pelagic or nektobenthic suspension feeders in the Cambrian seas. Slow moving they relied on their size and hard carapace for protection. Banffia grew up to 10 cm long and lacked gill slits. Nesonektris had a groove along both sides of the anterior section which may be a gill structure, and a rod-like structure in its posterior section resembling a notochord (a stiffened rod that runs along the back). It grew up to 17 cm long. Vetulicola had a pointed dorsal fin and a keel-like structure along its underside. It had more developed gill structures with gill filaments and slits. Fossils of Vetulicola have been found with worm tubes encrusted on the inner surface of the carapace. With over 45 worms on some fossils, it is likely this was a parasitic infestation.

The famous Pikaia from the Burgess Shale had some features of crown-chordates including myomeres (segmented pairs of muscles blocks), a short dorsal fin and a dorsal nerve cord; evidence for a notochord in Pikaia is unclear. However, its bi-lobed head with a pair of sensory tentacles and filamentous appendages interpreted as external gills, myomeres that extended to its tail, and anus at its rear tip, place it as a stem-chordate. It grew up to 4 cm and, lacking fast-twitch muscles, would have been a slow swimmer.

Shankouclava is the oldest known stem-tunicate. It was elongate, sac-like body with a pharyngeal basket and an oral siphon and reached up to 4 cm in length. Another early tunicate was Megasiphon. Known from a single specimen it had a barrel-shaped body about 2 cm wide at its apex with two 1 cm siphons extending from it and was an epibenthic suspension feeder.

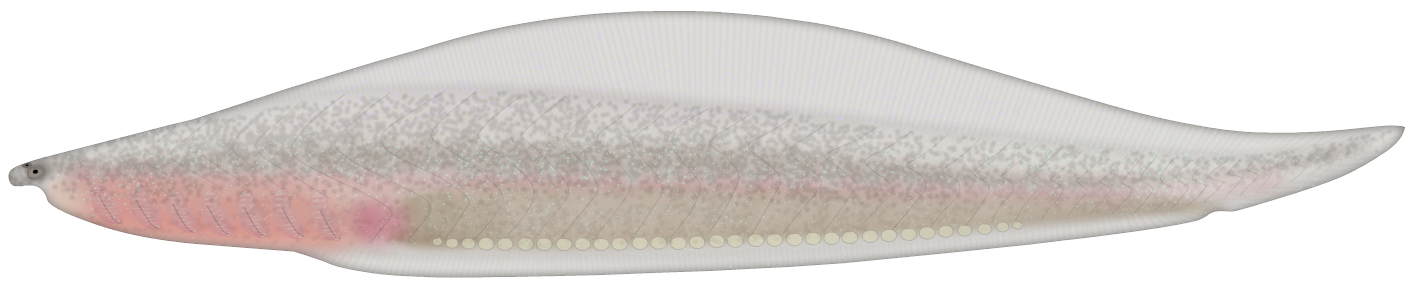
Haikouichthys is an extinct fish-like stem-vertebrate that lived in what is now China approximately 518 Ma

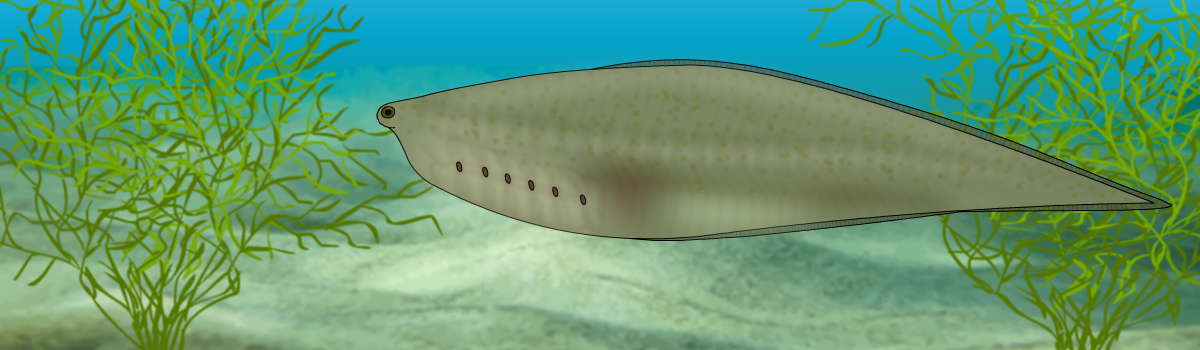
Life restoration of Metaspriggina, one of the earliest known vertebrates and a forerunner to later fish, known from the mid Cambrian of North America

Records of early vertebrates, despite their modern abundance, are rare during the Cambrian. Myllokunmingia and Haikouichthys from China are the earliest stem-vertebrates appearing in the fossil record about 516 Ma. They were primitive fish with a sail-like dorsal fin and paired lateral fin folds, myomeres, notochords and filamentous gills. They had a pair of small organs between the eyes that may have been part of an olfactory structure, or a second set of eyes. Metaspriggina, another stem-vertebrate from the Burgess Shale (about 506 Ma), had an elongate body with prominent eyes and pharyngeal gills. It grew to around 6 cm long and despite lacking fins was probably a capable swimmer. Nuucichthys and Emmonsaspis, which closely resemble Metaspriggina, are also known from the mid-Cambrian of North America. Conodonts are the earliest stem-vertebrates with mineralized skeleton. The phosphatic tooth-like elements of these soft-bodied jawless fish first appear during the mid-late Cambrian, although no body fossils are known from this time.

==== Echinodermata ====
Echinoderms first appear in the fossil record in Stage 3 (c. 521 Ma) when they evolved a biomineralized skeleton composed of stereom, a mesh-like structure of calcium carbonate. Early echinoderms evolved through successive bilateral, asymmetrical, triradial, and pentaradial body plans, but were already morphologically diverse and found globally from their initial appearance in the fossil record, indicating their more ancient origin.

The most primitive echinoderms, the Ctenocystoidea had a bilaterally symmetric body and no ambulacral system (the water vascular system characteristic of most echinoderms). Cincta were asymmetric with an early type of ambulacral system of two grooves along the side of the body leading to the mouth. Both were sessile or capable of only very slow movement and were suspension feeders. Soluta had a flat, asymmetric body with an anterior feeding ambulacrum consisting of a short, flexible appendage off set from the body with a mouth near the base. A second, longer appendage (stele) at the rear was used to move across the sea floor. Stylophora had an asymmetrical body with a single ambulacrum which may have been used for feeding or locomotion. Helicoplacoidea had triradial spiral-shaped bodies, a mouth on the side and three ambulacra embedded in the body wall. The first pentaradial echinoderms were the helicocystoids. Similar in body shape to the helicoplacoids, but with five ambulacra in the body wall and an upward facing mouth. Both were sessile, suspension feeders, using the tube feet of the ambulacra to capture particles from the sea water. Edrioasteroidea had pentaradial symmetry but had a disc- to globular-shaped body with the five ambulacra arranged around a central mouth. In some, the lower part of the body was buried in the sediment with the mouth and ambulacra exposed. Others attached directly to hard substrates. Eocrinoidea were the first echinoderms to have brachioles. These were long, slender, feeding appendages that extended from the five ambulacra arranged on the upper surface of the body. They were attached to the substrate via a stem and lived in small colonies. They were amongst the most abundant echinoids during the Cambrian with their skeletal plates a major component of limestones.

The sessile echinoderms were largely restricted to low-energy, offshore environments, such as reef flanks, and to feeding close to the sediment-water interface. Edrioasteroids were the first to develop strong enough attachment structures to colonise higher energy, nearshore environments such as carbonate hardgrounds, and eocrinoids evolved progressively longer stems that allowed them to feed higher in the water column.

==== Hemichordata ====
Hemichordata are divided into the worm-like Enteropneusta (acorn worms) and the colonial-living Pterobranchia. Gyaltsenglossus found in the Burgess Shale is a stem-group hemichordate. It had a worm-like body up to 2 cm long, with a long proboscis similar to enteropneusts, and a crown of six feeding arms with tentacles, similar to pterobranchs. It had two modes of feeding: using its tentacles to filter feed, temporarily anchoring itself to the substrate with its bulbous posterior; and its proboscis for deposit feeding.

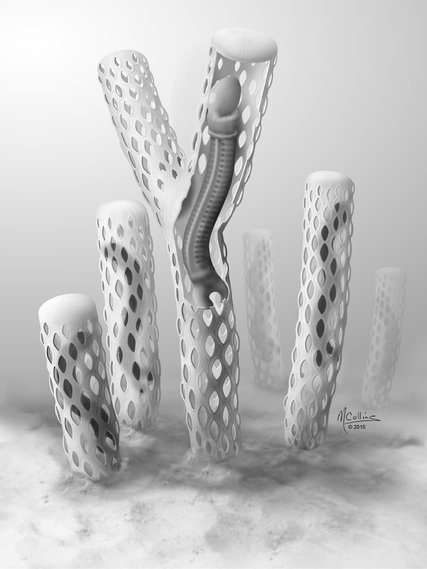
Life reconstruction of Oesia disjuncta in its tube (Margaretia). Part of the tube is removed to show the worm within.

The stem-enteropneusts Oesia and Spartobranchus are known from the Miaolingian. Oesia was a sessile, filter feeder with an average body size of 53cm. It built vertical, perforated, filamentous tubes up to 50 cm high. These tubes were thought to be the fossils of the green alga Margaretia, but Oesia have now been found preserved within them. With the tubes over twice as wide as the worm, it would have been able to move around freely within it. Spartobranchus lived in burrows on the seafloor, secreting a smooth, hard tube around its body. It grew up to 10 cm long and was probably a deposit feeder. Oesia and Spartobranchus both had a mix of pterobranch and enteropneust characteristics, but the fibrous tube, rear claw-like grasping structure (similar to pterobranch stalk) and sessile nature indicate Oesia was the more primitive of the two.

The earliest potential evidence of Pterobranchia is the tubular fossil Sokoloviina found in the Fortunian. More definitive fossils of Graptolithina are found from Cambrian Series 2, Stage 4. Graptolithina were colonial-living zooids, only a few mm in length, that had several pairs of tentacles used for filter feeding. They built colonies by collectively secreting organic material to form protective tubes (tubarium or rhabdosomes), where individual zooids remained connected by a stolon system. Dendroid graptolites appeared in the Miaolingian. These formed branching colonies attached to the sea floor and made up of hundreds to thousands of individuals. Rapid diversification led to the evolution of planktonic graptolites towards the end of the Cambrian.

== Symbol ==
The United States Federal Geographic Data Committee uses a "barred capital C" ⟨Ꞓ⟩ character to represent the Cambrian Period; this distinguishes it from the Carboniferous period which has symbol C. The Unicode character is U+A792 Ꞓ LATIN CAPITAL LETTER C WITH BAR.

== Gallery ==
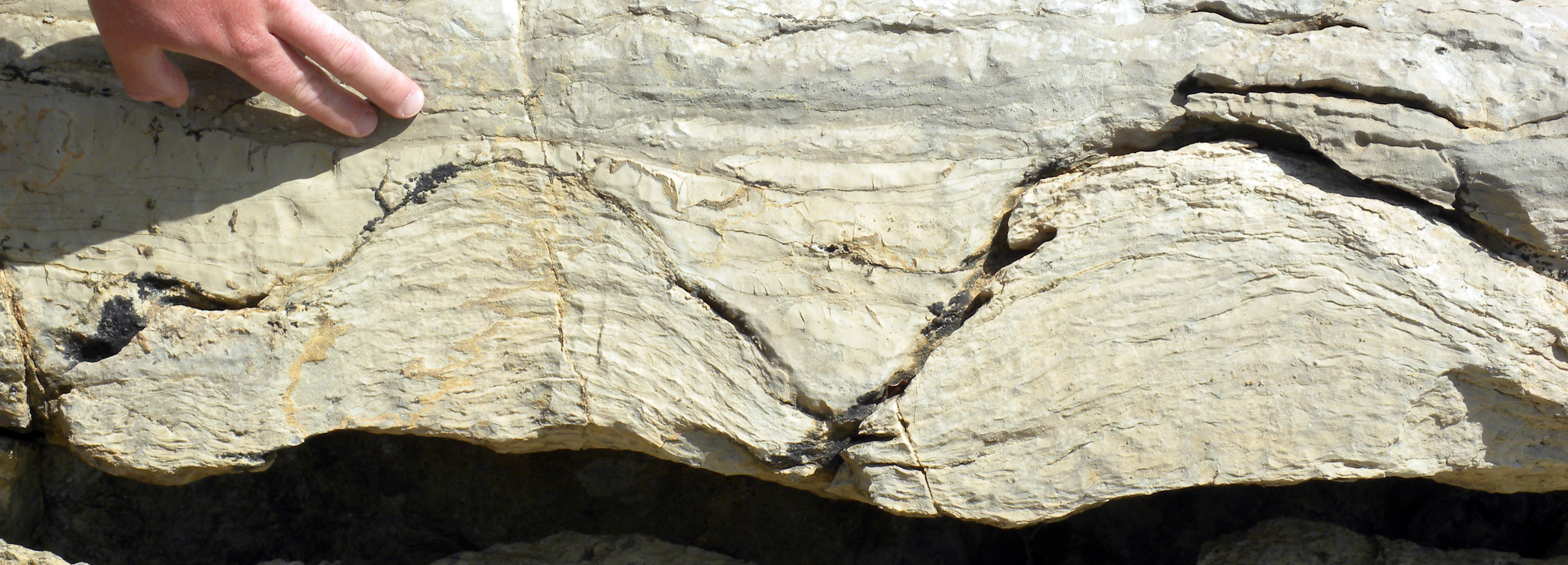
Stromatolites of the Pika Formation (Middle Cambrian) near Helen Lake, Banff National Park, Canada

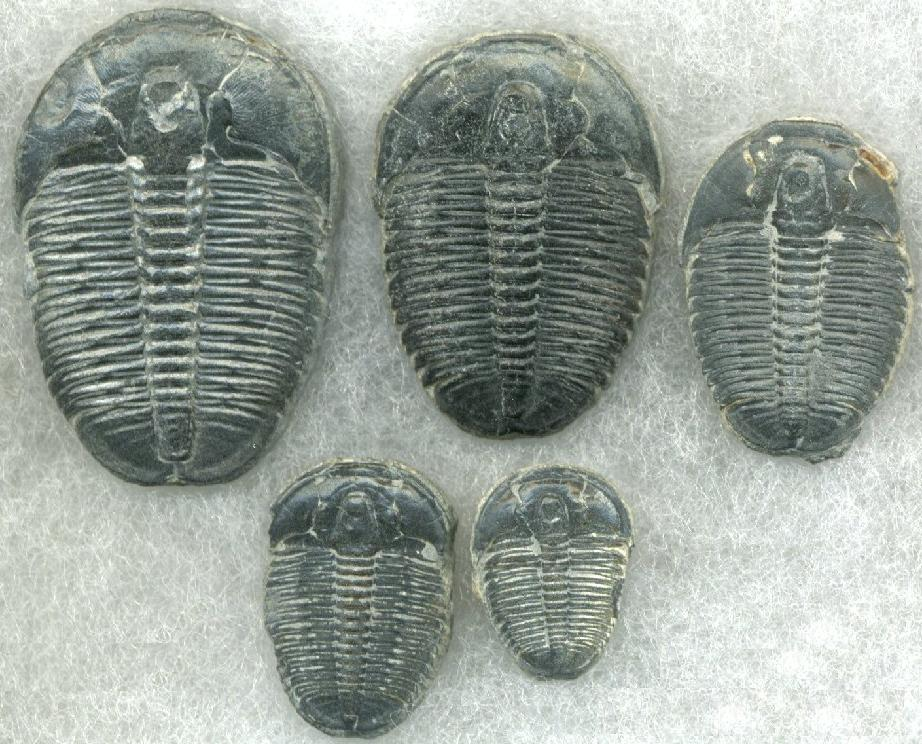
Trilobites, like these Elrathia kingii were very common arthropods during this time

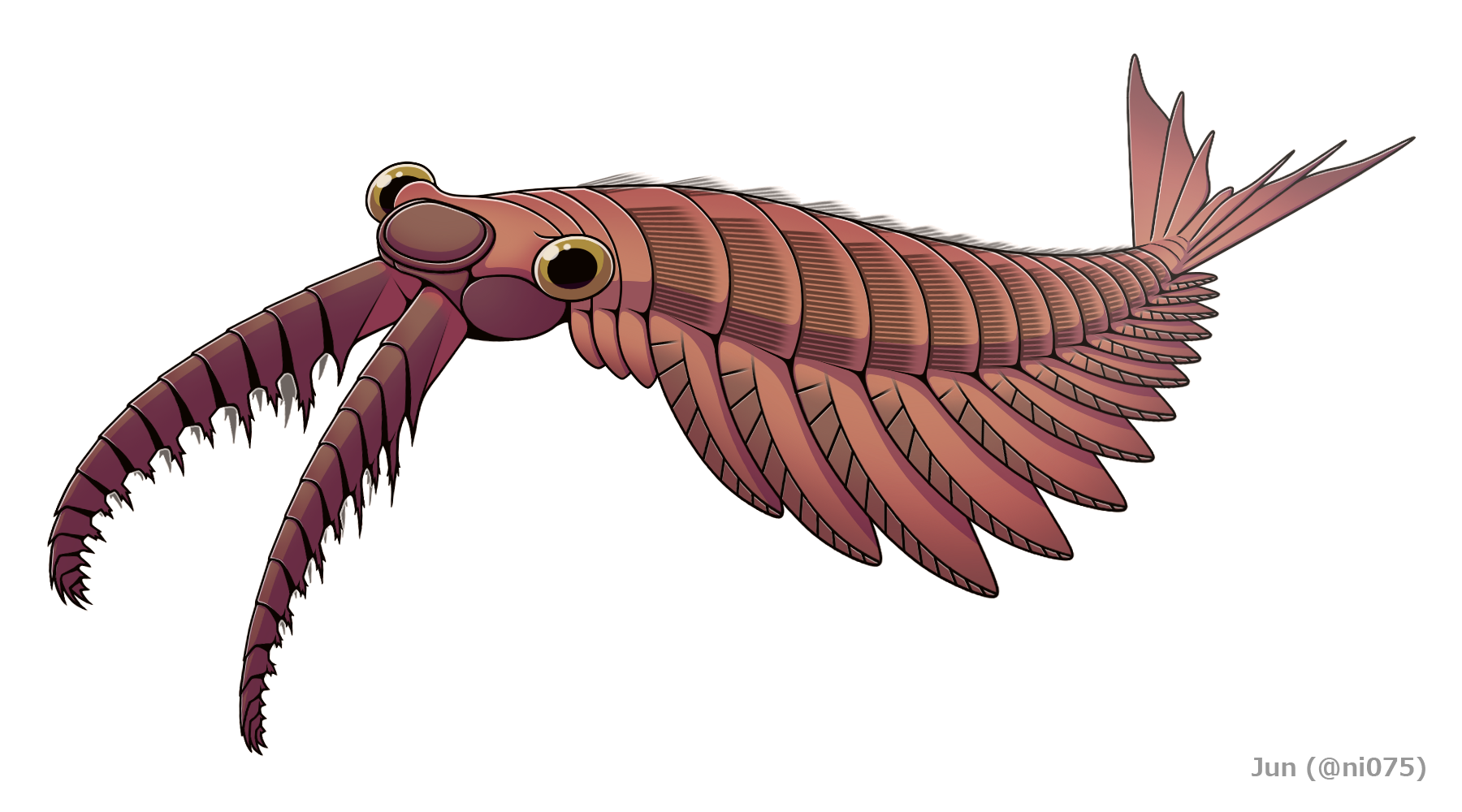
Anomalocaris was an early marine predator, a member of the stem-arthropod group Radiodonta

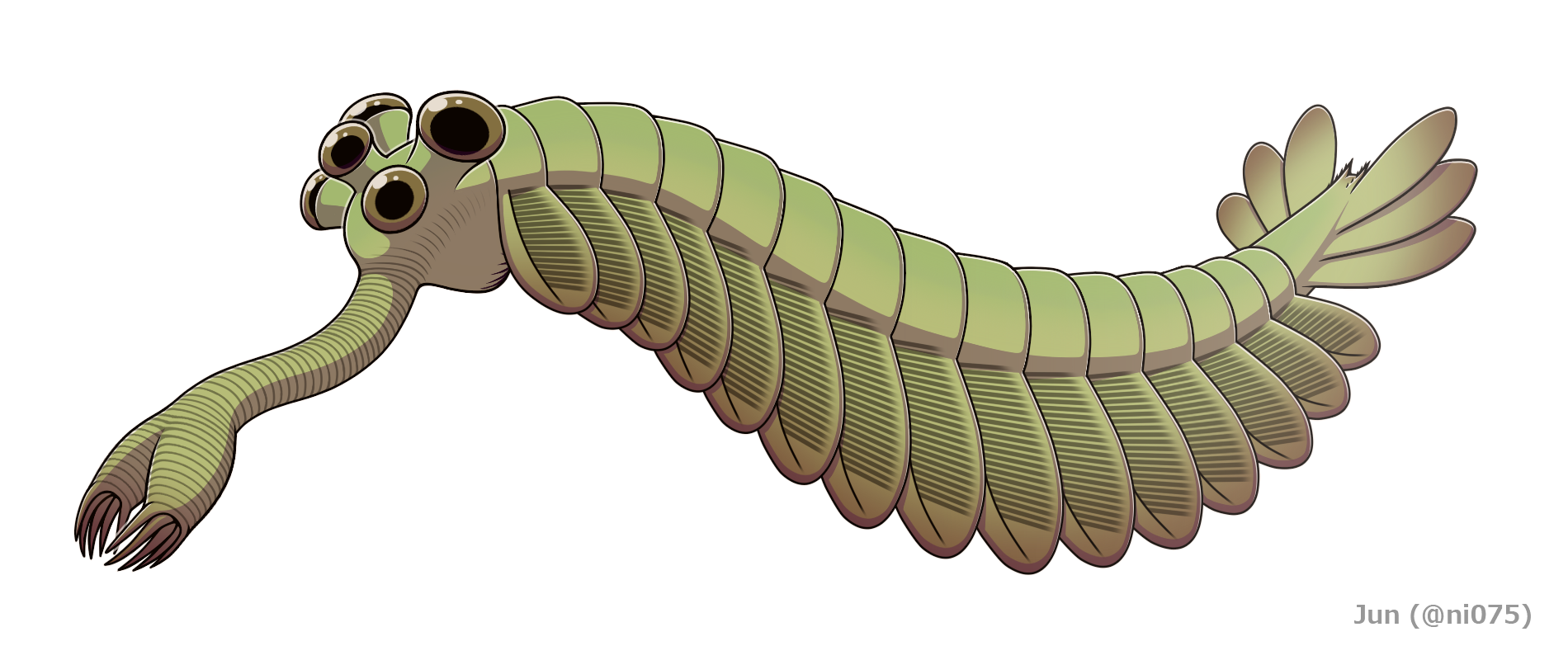
Opabinia was a bizarre stem-arthropod that possessed five stalked eyes, and a fused proboscis tipped with a claw-like appendage.

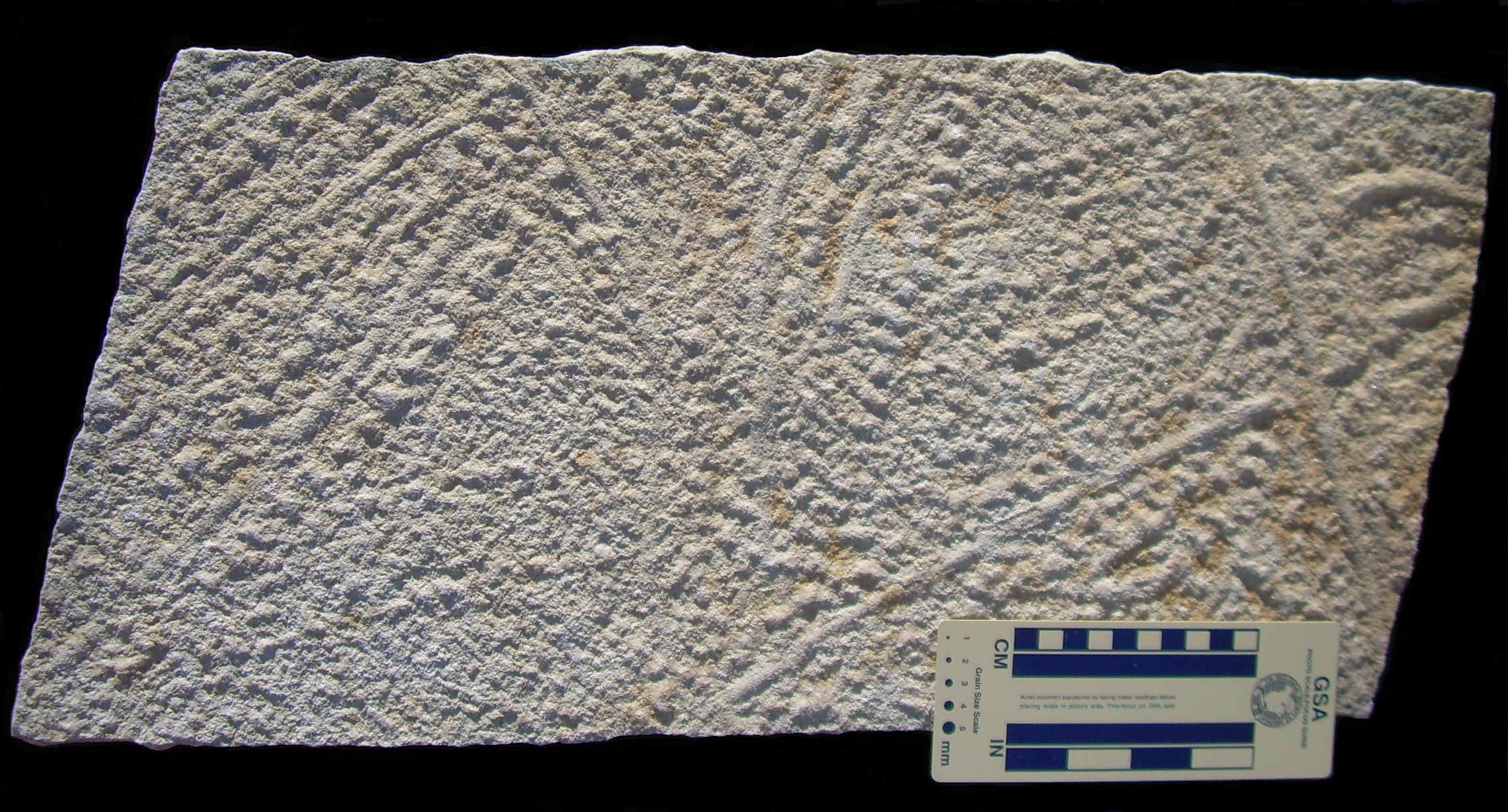
Protichnites were the trackways of arthropods that walked Cambrian beaches

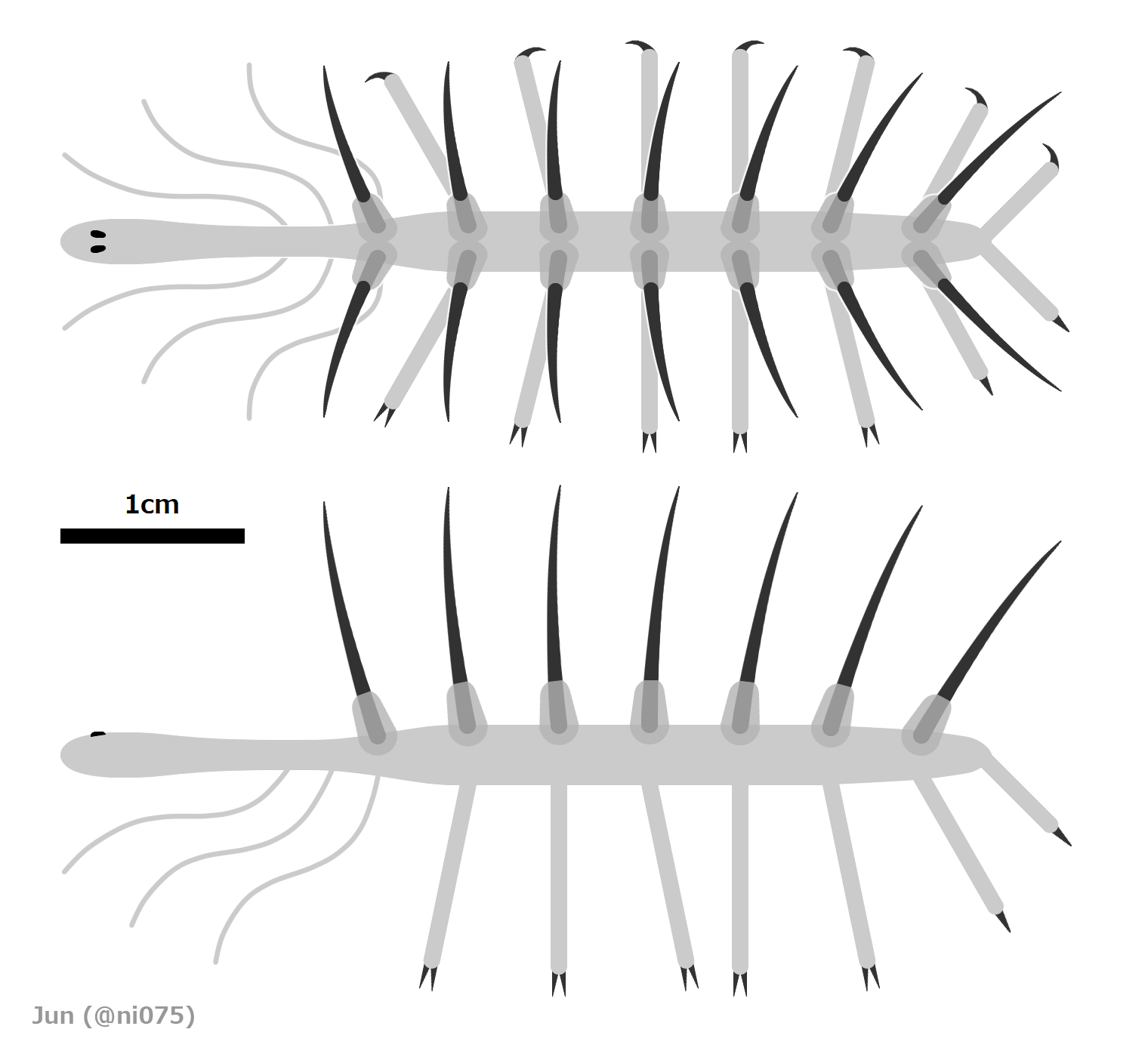
Hallucigenia sparsa was a member of the group lobopodia, that is considered to be related to modern velvet worms.

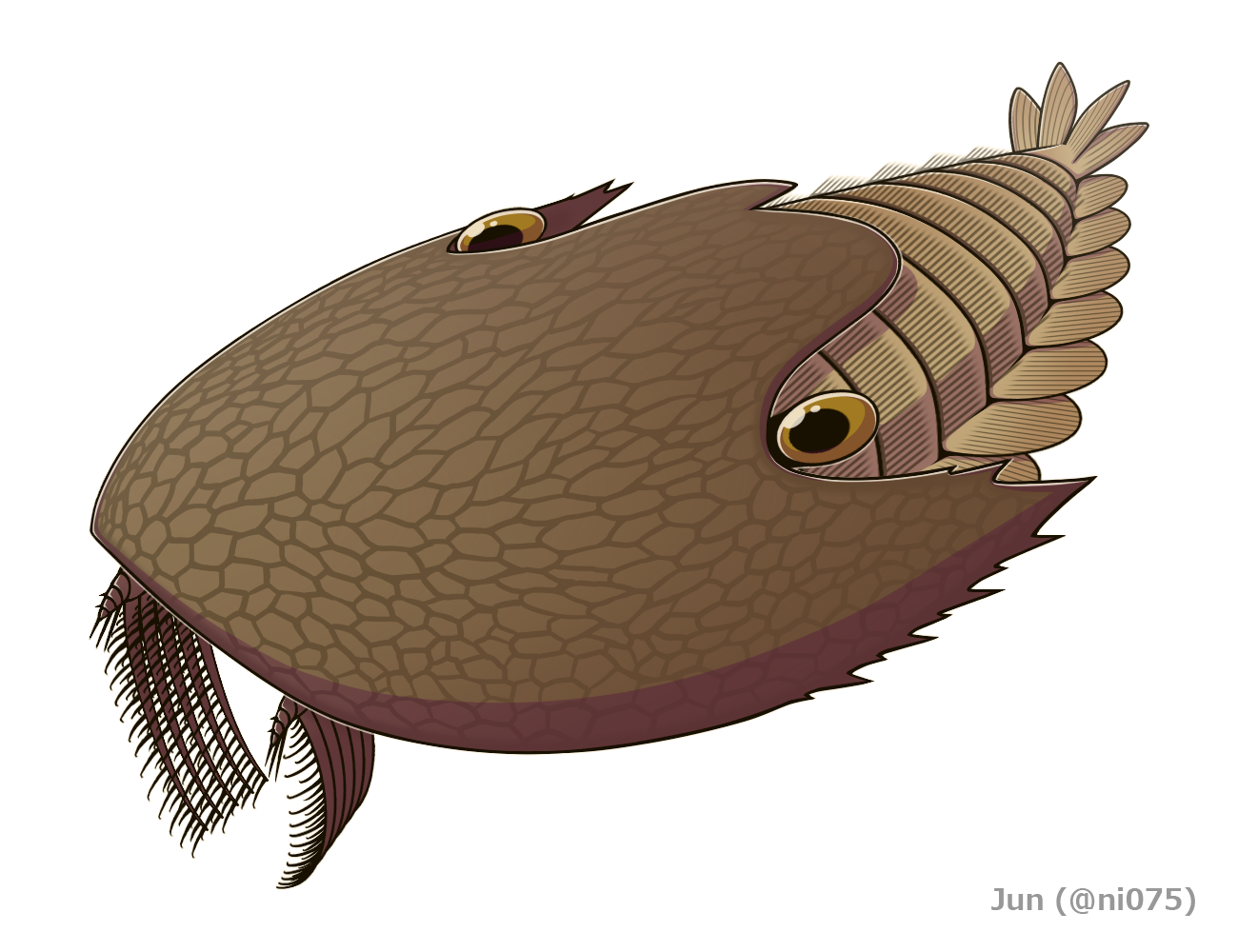
Cambroraster falcatus was a hurdiid radiodont that bore a large horseshoe-shaped carapace.

Pikaia was a stem-chordate from the Middle Cambrian

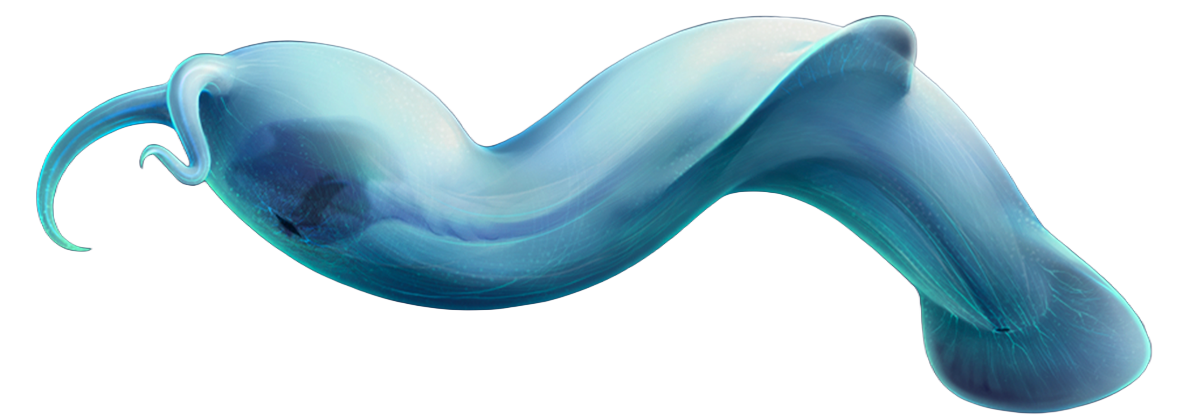
Amiskwia sagittiformis was a large bodied gnathiferan from Canada and China

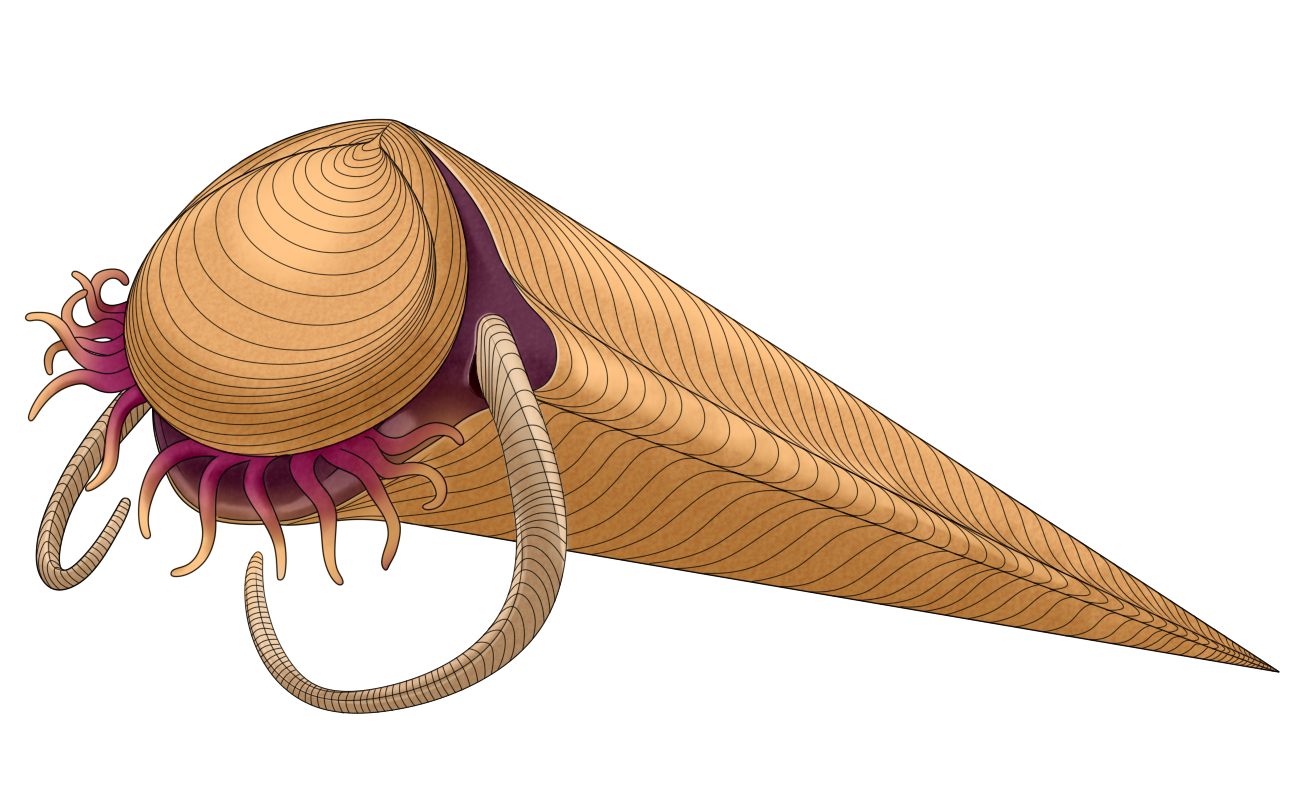
Haplophrentis was a hyolith, a group of conical shelled lophotrochozoans that were potentially related to either lophophorates or mollusks.

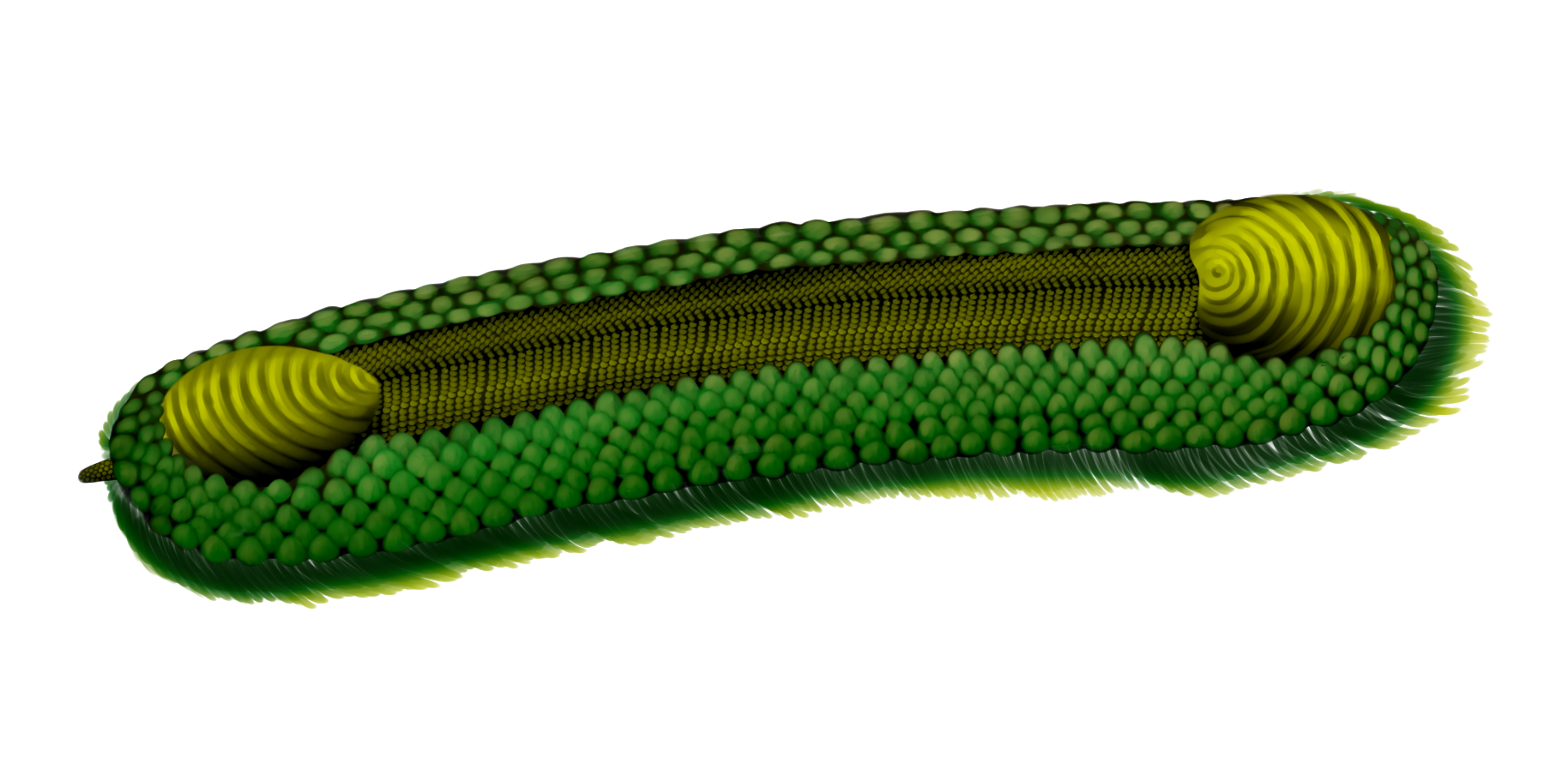
Halkieria was a bizarre invertebrate that was an early member of the mollusk group

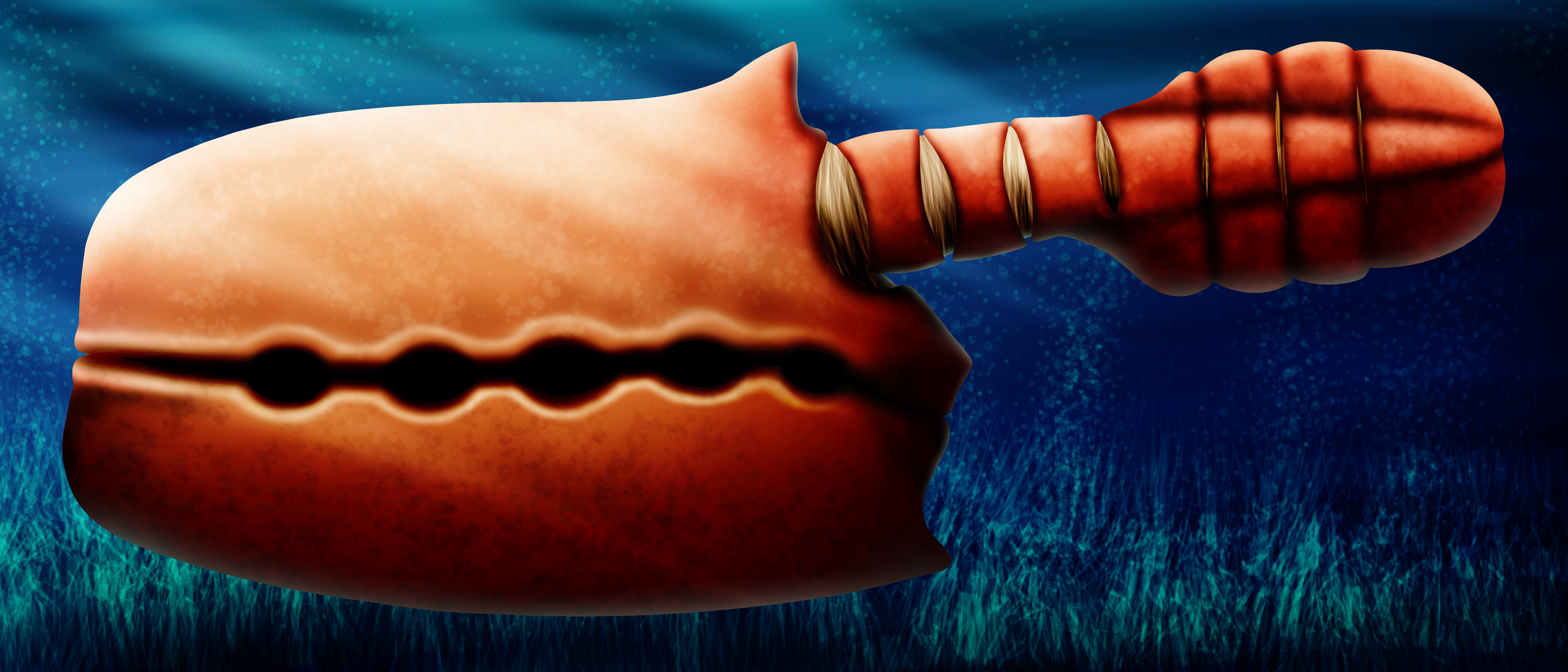
Life restoration of Vetulicola , a member of "Vetulicolia", which are suggested to represent relatives of chordates

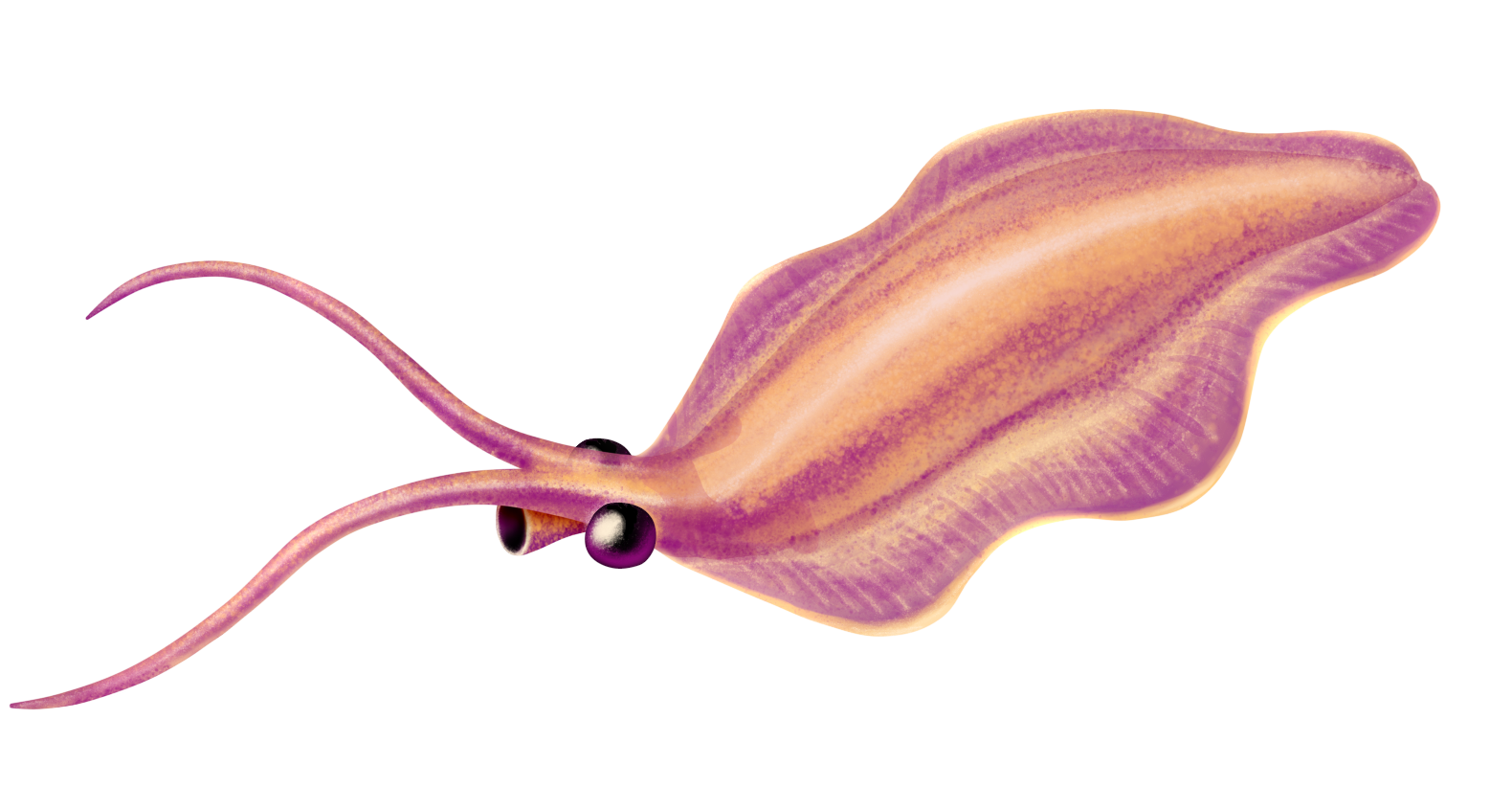
Despite its superficially squid-like appearance, Nectocaris is thought to be most closely related to arrow worms

== See also ==
- Cambrian–Ordovician extinction event – circa 488 Ma
- Dresbachian extinction event—circa 499 Ma
- End Botomian extinction event—circa 513 Ma
- List of fossil sites (with link directory)
- Type locality (geology), the locality where a particular rock type, stratigraphic unit, fossil or mineral species is first identified
