= List of time periods =

The categorization of the past into discrete, quantified named blocks of time is called periodization. This is a list of such named time periods as defined in various fields of study.

These can be divided broadly into prehistoric periods or archaeological periods for the time before the development of writing, and historical periods, starting when written records began to be kept. The existence of written sources, however, doesn't at all exclude differences in periodization between archaeology and history.

In archaeology and anthropology, prehistory is subdivided into the three-age system. This list includes the use of the three-age system as well as a number of various designations used in reference to sub-ages within the traditional three.

The dates for each age can vary by region. On the geologic time scale, the Holocene epoch starts at the end of the last glacial period of the current ice age (c. 10,000 BC) and continues to the present. The beginning of the Mesolithic is usually considered to correspond to the beginning of the Holocene epoch.

== Geological periods ==
=== Era ===
- Precambrian
  - Hadean
  - Archean (or archaeozoic)
    - Eoarchean
    - Paleoarchean
    - Mesoarchean
    - Neoarchean
  - Proterozoic
    - Paleoproterozoic
      - Siderian
      - Rhyacian
      - Orosirian
      - Statherian
    - Mesoproterozoic
      - Calymmian
      - Ectasian
      - Stenian
    - Neoproterozoic
      - Tonian
      - Cryogenian
      - Ediacaran
- Phanerozoic
  - Paleozoic
    - Cambrian
      - Early Cambrian
        - Cambrian Explosion
      - Terreneuvian
        - Fortunian
        - Cambrian Stage 2
      - Cambrian Series 2
        - Cambrian Stage 3
        - Cambrian Stage 4
      - Miaolingian
        - Wuliuan
        - Drumian
        - Guzhangian
      - Furongian
        - Paibian
        - Jiangshangian
        - Cambrian Stage 10
    - Ordovician
    - Silurian
    - Devonian
    - Carboniferous
    - Permian
  - Mesozoic
    - Triassic
      - Early Triassic
        - Induan
        - Olenekian
      - Middle Triassic
        - Anisian
        - Ladinian
      - Late Triassic
        - Carnian
        - Norian
        - Rhaetian
    - Jurassic
    - Cretaceous
      - Early Cretaceous
        - Berriasian
        - Valanginian
        - Hauterivian
        - Barremian
        - Aptian
        - Albian
      - Late Cretaceous
        - Cenomanian
        - Turonian
        - Coniacian
        - Santonian
        - Campanian
        - Maastrichtian
  - Cenozoic
    - Paleogene
      - Paleocene
        - Danian
        - Selandian
        - Thanetian
      - Eocene
        - Ypresian
        - Lutetian
        - Bartonian
        - Priabonian
      - Oligocene
        - Rupelian
        - Chattian
    - Neogene
      - Miocene
        - Aquitanian
        - Burdigalian
        - Langhian
        - Serravallian
        - Tortonian
        - Messinian
      - Pliocene
        - Zanclean
        - Piacenzian
    - Quaternary
      - Pleistocene
        - Gelasian
        - Calabrian
        - Chibanian
        - Late Pleistocene
      - Holocene
        - Greenlandian
        - Northgrippian
        - Meghalayan
      - Anthropocene (rejected proposal)
        - Anthropocene Age 1

== General periods ==
- Geologic Time – Period prior to humans. 4.6 billion to 3 million years ago. (See "prehistoric periods" for more detail into this.)
- Prehistory – Period between the appearance of Homo ("humans"; first stone tools c. three million years ago) and the invention of writing systems (for the Ancient Near East: c. five thousand years ago).
  - Paleolithic – the earliest period of the Stone Age
    - Lower Paleolithic – time of archaic human species, predates Homo sapiens
    - Middle Paleolithic – coexistence of archaic and anatomically modern human species
    - Upper Paleolithic – worldwide expansion of anatomically modern humans, the disappearance of archaic humans by extinction or admixture with modern humans; earliest evidence for pictorial art.
  - Mesolithic (Epipaleolithic) – a period in the development of human technology between the Palaeolithic and Neolithic periods.
  - Neolithic – a period of primitive technological and social development, beginning about 10,200 BC in parts of the Middle East, and later in other parts of the world.
  - Chalcolithic (or "Eneolithic", "Copper Age") – still largely Neolithic in character, when early copper metallurgy appeared alongside the use of stone tools.
  - Bronze Age – not part of prehistory for all regions and civilizations who had adopted or developed a writing system.
  - Iron Age – not part of prehistory for all civilizations who had introduced written records during the Bronze Age.
- Ancient history – Aggregate of past events from the beginning of recorded human history and extending as far as the Early Middle Ages or the Postclassical Era. The span of recorded history is roughly five thousand years, beginning with the earliest linguistic records in the third millennium BC in Mesopotamia and Egypt.
  - Classical antiquity – Broad term for a long period of cultural history centered on the Mediterranean Sea, comprising the interlocking civilizations of ancient Greece and ancient Rome, collectively known as the Greco-Roman world. It is the period in which Greek and Roman society flourished and wielded great influence throughout Europe, North Africa and the Middle East.
- Post-classical history – Period of time that immediately followed ancient history. Depending on the continent, the era generally falls between the years AD 200–600 and AD 1200–1500. The major classical civilizations that the era follows are Han China (ending in 220), the Western Roman Empire (in 476), the Gupta Empire (in the 550s), and the Sasanian Empire (in 651).
  - Middle Ages – Lasted from the 5th to the 15th century. It began with the collapse of the Western Roman Empire in 476 and is variously demarcated by historians as ending with the Fall of Constantinople in 1453, or the discovery of America by Columbus in 1492, merging into the Renaissance and the Age of Discovery.
    - Early Middle Ages
    - High Middle Ages
    - Late Middle Ages
- Modern history – After the post-classical era
  - Early modern period – The chronological limits of this period are open to debate. It emerges from the Late Middle Ages (c. 1500), demarcated by historians as beginning with the fall of Constantinople in 1453, in forms such as the Italian Renaissance in the West, the Ming dynasty in the East, and the rise of the Aztecs in the New World. The period ends with the beginning of the Age of Revolutions.
  - Late modern period – Began approximately in the mid-18th century; notable historical milestones included the French Revolution, the American Revolution, the Industrial Revolution and the Great Divergence
  - Contemporary history – History within living memory. It shifts forward with the generations, and today is the span of historic events from approximately 1945 that are immediately relevant to the present time.

== Forms of modernity ==
- Hominids archaeologically and anatomically similar or identical to modern humans (HAASMHs)
- Anatomically modern humans (AMHs)
- Technologically modern humans (TMHs)

== Technological periods ==
- Prehistory
  - Paleolithic (Lower, Middle, Upper)
  - Mesolithic (Epipaleolithic)
  - Neolithic
  - Chalcolithic (or "Eneolithic", "Copper Age")
- Ancient history (The Bronze and Iron Ages are not part of prehistory for all regions and civilizations who had adopted or developed a writing system.)
  - Bronze Age
  - Iron Age
- Late Middle Ages
  - Renaissance
- Early modern history
- Modern history
  - Industrial Age (1760–1970)
  - Machine Age (1880–1945)
    - Age of Oil (1901–present)
    - Jet Age (1940s)
  - Nuclear Age (a.k.a. Atomic Era) (1945/1950–present)
  - Space Age (1957–present)
  - Information Age (1970–present)
    - Internet Age (1990–present)

== African periods ==
=== Egyptian periods ===
Prehistoric Period

- Prehistoric Egypt (pre-3150 BC)

Dynastic Egypt

- Early Dynastic Period or Archaic Period (two dynasties) (3150 BC – 2686 BC)
- Old Kingdom (four dynasties) (2686 BC – 2181 BC)
- First Intermediate Period (four dynasties) (2181 BC – 2055 BC)
- Middle Kingdom (three dynasties) (2055 BC – 1650 BC)
- Second Intermediate Period (four dynasties) (1650 BC – 1550 BC)
- New Kingdom (three dynasties) (1550 BC – 1069 BC)
- Third Intermediate Period (five dynasties) (1069 BC – 664 BC)

Antiquity

- Late Period of Ancient Egypt (six dynasties: of these six, two were Persian dynasties that ruled from capitals distant from Egypt) (664 BC – c. 332 BC)
- Argead and Ptolemaic dynasties (332 BC – 30 BC)
- Aegyptus (fifteen Roman dynasties that ruled from capitals distant from Egypt) (30 BC – 641 AD)
  - Sasanian Egypt (one dynasty) (619–629)
- Coptic period (300 AD – 900 AD)

Islamic Egypt

- Egypt under four foreign Arabic dynasties that ruled from capitals distant from Egypt.
  - Rashidun Egypt (641–661)
  - Umayyad Egypt (661–750)
  - Abbasid Egypt (750–868 and 905–935)

Medieval Egypt

- Tulunid Egypt (868–905)
- Ikhshidid Egypt (935–969)
- Fatimid Caliphate (969–1171)
- Ayyubid Sultanate (1171–1250)
- Mamluk Sultanate (1250–1517)
  - Bahri dynasty (1250–1382)
  - Burji dynasty (1382–1517)

Modern Egypt

- Ottoman Egypt (dynasty that ruled from a capital distant from Egypt) (1517–1867)
- Muhammad Ali dynasty (1805–1953)
  - Khedivate of Egypt (1867–1914)
  - Sultanate of Egypt (1914–1922)

Contemporary Egypt

- Kingdom of Egypt (1922–1953)
- Republican Egypt (1953–present)

=== Ethiopian periods ===
Antiquity

- Gash Group (c. 3000 - 1800 BC)
  - Land of Punt? (2500 - 980 BC)
- Dʿmt (980 - 400 BC)
- Kingdom of Aksum (150 BC - 960 AD)

Middle Ages

- Harla kingdom (501 - 1500)
- Sultanate of Shewa (896 - 1286)
- Sultanate of Dahlak
- Zagwe dynasty (1137 - 1270)
- Kingdom of Damot (900s/1200s - 1500s)
- Kingdom of Kaffa (c. 1390 - 1897)
- Ennarea (1300s - c. 1710)

Pre Ethiopian Afari Periods

- Imamate of Aussa (1577 - 1734)
- Emirate of Harar (1647 - 1877)
- Sultanate of Aussa (1734 - 1936)

Pre Ethiopian Omoro Periods

- Oromo expansion (1543 - 1600s)
- Kingdom of Jimma (1737 - 1889)
- Kingdom of Limmu-Ennarea (1801 - 1891)
- Kingdom of Gomma (1780 - 1887)
- Kingdom of Gera (1835 - 1887)
- Kingdom of Gumma (c. 1770 - 1902)

Periods of the Ethiopian Empire

- Early Solomonic period (1270 - 1529)
  - Solomonic Golden Age (1344 - 1468)
- Ethiopian–Adal War (1527 - 1543)
- Oromo expansion (1543 - 1769)
- Gondarine period (1632-1769)
- Zemene Mesafint (1769-1855)
- Modern era (1855 - 1936)
  - Menelik II's conquests (1865 - 1904)
  - Italian Eritrea (1882 - 1936)
  - Modernization (1913 - 1974)
- Italian East Africa (1936 - 1941)
- Post War Ethiopia (1941 - 1971)
  - British Administration in Ethiopia (1941 - 1944) and Eritrea (1941 - 1952)
  - Federation of Ethiopia and Eritrea (1952 - 1962)

Contemporary Ethiopia

- Communist Ethiopia (1974 - 1991)
  - Derg (1974 - 1987)
  - People's Democratic Republic of Ethiopia (1987 - 1991)
- Federal Republic of Ethiopia and State of Eritrea (1991 - present)

=== Libyan periods ===
Prehistoric Libya

- Prehistoric Libya (pre-600 BC)

Early Libya

- Carthaginian Libya (600 BC – 200 BC)
- Roman Libya (200 BC – 487 AD)
- Vandal Libya (487 AD – ≈600 AD)
- Islamic Libya (≈600 – ≈1200)
- Ottoman Libya (≈1600 – ≈1900)

Modern Libya

- Colonial Libya (≈1900 – ≈1950)
- Libya as an independent country
  - Early Independent Era
  - Libyan Arab Republic (September 1969–1977)
  - Great Socialist People's Libyan Arab Jamahiriya
  - Contemporary Libya (2011–present)

== American (continent) periods ==
Pre-Columbian America

- Classic and Postclassic eras, Central America (200–1519)
- Early Intermediate, Middle Horizon, Late Intermediate, Late Horizon (Peru, 200–1534)
  - Huari, Chimú, Chincha, Chanka people, Tiwanaku, Inca

Colonial America

- Baroque (New World, 1600–1750)
- Spanish hegemony (Americas, 1492–1832)

=== Mexican periods ===
Ancient and Pre-Columbian Mexico

- Olmecs (1500 BC- 400 BC)
- Mayans (3000 BC – 600 AD)
- Teotihuacan (1 AD - 500 AD)
- Toltecs (800 AD - 1000 AD)
- Aztecs (1000 AD – 1512 AD)

Colonial Mexico

- Spanish conquest of Mexico (1519 – 1521)
- New Spain (1535 - 1821)

Independence Era

- Mexican War of Independence (1810 - 1821)
- First Mexican Empire (1821 -1823)
- First Mexican Republic (1824 - 1835)
- Centralist Republic of Mexico (1835 - 1846)

Liberal Mexico

- Second Federal Republic of Mexico (1846 - 1863)
- Second French Mexican Empire (1864 - 1867)
- Restored Republic (1867 - 1876)
- Porfiriato (1876 - 1911)

Modern Mexico

- Revolutionary Mexico (1910 - 1917)
- Maximato (1928 - 1934)
- PRI One-Party State (1934 - 2000)
- Contemporary Mexico (2000 - Present)

=== United States historical periods ===
Pre-Colonial era

- Lithic stage (before 8500 BC)
- Archaic stage (8000-1000 BC)
- Formative stage (1000 BC - 500 AD)
- Woodland period (1000 BC - 1000 AD)
- Classic stage (500 - 1200)
- Mississippian period (1000 - 1600)
- Post-Classic stage (after 1200)
- Mississippian shatter zone (1540-1730)

Thirteen British Colonies (1607–1775)

United Colonies (1775-1781)

- American Revolutionary War

Confederation period (1781-1789)

First Party System (1789–1824)

- Federalist Era (1789–1800)
- Jeffersonian democracy (1790s–1820s)
- Era of Good Feelings (1817–1825)

Second Party System (1824–1856)

- Jacksonian democracy (1825–1854)
- Civil War Era (1849–1865)

Third Party System (1856–1896)

- American Civil War (1861–1865)
- Reconstruction era (1865–1877) (Some of this time period is known as the "Old West".)
- Gilded Age (1877–1896)

Fourth Party System (1896–1932)

- Progressive Era (1896–1917)
- United States in World War I (1917–1918)
- Roaring Twenties (1920–1929)

Fifth Party System (1932–1980)

- Great Depression (1929–1939)
- United States home front during World War II (1942–1945)
- Post-World War II (1945–1964)
- Civil Rights Movement (1954–1968)
- United States in the Vietnam War (1955–1973)

Sixth Party System (1980–present)

- Reagan Era (1980–1991)
- Post-Cold War period (1991–2008)
- Contemporary United States (2008-present)

== Asian periods ==
=== Chinese periods ===
Bronze Age China

Archaic China

- Shang dynasty (1600–1046 BC)
- Zhou dynasty (1046–256 BC)
  - Western Zhou (1046–771 BC)
  - Eastern Zhou (771–256 BC)
    - Spring and Autumn period (771–476 BC)
    - Warring States period (476–221 BC)
- Qin dynasty (221–206 BC)

Antiquity

- Han dynasty (202 BC – 220 AD)
  - Western Han (206 BC – 2 AD)
  - Xin dynasty (9–23 AD)
  - Eastern Han (25–220 AD)
- Six Dynasties (220–580)
  - Three Kingdoms (220–265)
  - Jin dynasty (266–420)
  - Southern and Northern Dynasties (420–580)

Medieval China

- Sui dynasty (580–618)
- Tang dynasty (623–907)
- Five Dynasties and Ten Kingdoms period (907–960)
- Song dynasty (960–1279)
  - Northern Song (960–1127), Liao dynasty (907–1115)
  - Western Xia dynasty (1038–1227)
  - Southern Song (1127–1279), Jin dynasty (1115–1234)

Mongol China

- Yuan dynasty (1271–1368)

Late Dynastic Period

- Ming dynasty (1368–1644)
- Qing dynasty (1644–1911)

Modern China

- Republic of China (1912–1949)
  - Xinhai Revolution (1911–1912)
  - Warlord Era (1918–1927)

Contemporary China

- Chinese Civil War (1927–1936/1946–1950)
- Second Sino-Japanese War (1937–1945)

Post-Contemporary China

- People's Republic of China and Taiwan (1949–present)

=== Indian periods ===

- South Asian Stone Age
  - Pre-Harappan
    - Mehrgarh
- Bronze Age India (3340 BC – 1350 BC)
  - Indus Valley Civilization
    - Early Harappan
    - Early Mature Harappan
    - Mature Harappan
    - Late Harappan
      - Punjab Phase
      - Jhukar Phase
      - Rangpur Phase
    - Final Harappan
- Iron Age in India (1350 BC – 200 BC)
  - Vedic period (1350 BC – 500 BC): Mahajanapadas
  - Magadha period (c.500 BC – c.750 AD): Nandas, Mauryans, Shungas
- Classical India (200 BC – 500 AD)
  - Sangam period (300 BC – 600 AD): Cholas, Chalukyas, Cheras, Pallavas and Pandyans
  - Golden period: Kushans (50 AD – 220 AD), Satavahanas (230 BC – 220 AD), Guptas (320 AD – 535 AD) and Vakatakas (300AD – 650 AD)
- Medieval Age in India (500–1526)
  - Tripartite period (c.750 – c.900): Palas, Rashtrakutas and Gurjara-Pratihara
  - Muslim period (712–1857): Delhi, Bengal, Bahmani and Gujarat Sultanate
  - Vijayanagara Empire (1336–1646), Gajapati Empire (1434–1541) and Kingdom of Mewar (1325–1448)
- Modern Age in India (1526 – present)
  - Mughal Empire (1526–1857)
  - Sur Empire (1538-1555)
  - Maratha Empire (1674–1818)
  - Sikh Empire (1799–1849)
  - Colonial period: British Raj (1858 – 1947)
  - Independence (1947 – present)

=== Iranian periods ===
Prehistoric Iran

Ancient age:

- Elam (3200 – 539 BC)
- Median kingdom (1000 – 550 BC)
- Achaemenid Empire (550 – 330 BC)
- Greek occupation of Persia (330 – 312 BC):
- Seleucid Empire (312 – 63 BC)
- Parthian Empire (247 BC – 224 AD)
- Sasanian Empire (224 – 651 AD)

Medieval age:

- Persia under Caliphates (651 – 820 AD)
- Iranian Intermezzo (c.820 – 1037): Tahirids (821 to 873), Saffarids (861 to 1003), Samanids (819 to 999) and Buyids (934 to 1062)
- Seljuk Empire (1037–1194)
- Khwarazmian Empire (1194–1219)
- Mongol conquest of Persia and Mesopotamia (1219 –1256)
- Ilkhanate (1256–1335)
- Disintegration of the Ilkhanate (1335–1370): Jalayirids, Chobanids, Muzaffarids, Injuids, Sarbadars, and Kartids
- Timurid Empire (1370–1507) and Aq Qoyunlu (1378–1501)

Modern age:

- Safavid Iran (1501–1736)
- Afsharid Iran (1736 –c.1750)
- Zand Iran (1750–1794)
- Qajar Iran (1794–1925)
- Pahlavi Iran (1925–1979)
- Islamic Republic of Iran (1979–present)

=== Japanese periods ===
Archaic Japan

- Jōmon period (10,501 BC – 400 BC)
- Yayoi period (450 BC – 250 AD)
- Kofun period (250–600)

Feudal Japan

- Asuka period (643–710)
- Nara period (743–794)
- Heian period (795–1185)
- Kamakura period (1185–1333)

Samurai Japan

- Muromachi period (1333–1573)
- Azuchi–Momoyama period (1573–1603)

Modern Japan

- Edo period (1603–1868)
- Meiji period (1868–1912)
- Taishō period (1912–1926)

Contemporary Japan

- Shōwa period (1926–1989)
  - Post-occupation era (1952 – present)
- Heisei period (1989–2019)
- Reiwa period (2019–present)

=== Mesopotamian periods ===
Archaic Period

- Mesopotamia
  - Samarra culture
  - Hassuna culture
  - Halaf-Ubaid Transitional period
  - Ubaid period
  - Uruk period
  - Jemdet Nasr period (3100 BC – 2900 BC)
  - Early Dynastic Period (2900 BC – 2270 BC)
  - Akkadian Empire (2334 BC – 2154 BC)
  - Gutian dynasty (2083 BC – 2050 BC)
  - Ur III period (2050 BC – 1940 BC)
  - First Babylonian dynasty (1830 BC – 1531 BC), Hittites (1800 BC – 1178 BC)
  - Kassites (1531 BC – 1135 BC), Mitanni (1500 BC – 1300 BC)
  - Neo-Assyrian Empire (911 BC – 609 BC)
  - Neo-Babylonian Empire (626 BC – 539 BC), Medes (678 BC – 549 BC)

Imperial Period

- Persian Empires (550 BC – 651 AD)
  - Achaemenid Empire (550 BC – 330 BC)
  - Conquered by Macedonian Empire (330 BC – 312 BC)
  - Seleucid Empire (312 BC – 63 BC)
  - Parthian Empire (247 BC – 224 AD)
  - Sasanian Empire (224 AD – 651 AD)

Islamic Period

- Islamicate periods and Islamic Golden Age (7th – 21st centuries)
  - High Caliphate (685–945)
  - Earlier Middle Period (945–1250)
  - Later Middle Period (1250–1500)
  - Rashidun Caliphate (632–661)
  - Umayyad Caliphate (661–750)
  - Abbasid Caliphate (750–1258), Fatimid Caliphate (909–1171)
    - Buyid dynasty (934–1055)
    - Seljuq dynasty (1055–1171)
    - Ayyubid dynasty (1171–1341)
  - Ottoman Empire (1300–1923)
    - Safavid Empire (1501–1736)
  - Kingdom of Iraq under British mandate (1921-1932)
  - Hashemite Kingdom of Iraq (1932-1958)
    - Hashemite Arab Federation (1958)
  - Qasimist Republic of Iraq (1958-68)
  - Ba'athist Iraq (1968-2003)
  - Coalition Provisional Authority (2003-04)
  - Republic of Iraq (2004-present)

=== Mongolian periods ===
Antiquity

- Xiongnu (Mongolia, 220 BC – AD 200)

Medieval Mongolia

- Rouran Khaganate (Mongolia, Manchuria, Xianbei, AD 330 – 555)
  - Sixteen Kingdoms (Xianbei, Turkic peoples, 304–439)
- Uyghur Khaganate (Mongolia, Manchuria, Tibet, 744–848)
- Liao dynasty (Khitan people, 907–1125)

Imperial Mongolia

- Mongol Empire (Mongolia, 1206–1380)
  - Yuan Dynasty of China (≈1250 – ≈1350)
  - Golden Horde (≈1250 – 1380)

Modern Mongolia

- Qing dynasty (Manchu China, 1692–1911)

=== Southeast Asian periods ===
Maritime Southeast Asia

- Srivijaya (Indonesia, 3rd – 14th centuries), Tarumanagara (358–723), Sailendra (8th and 9th centuries), Kingdom of Sunda (669–1579), Kingdom of Mataram (752–1045), Kediri (1045–1221), Singhasari (1222–1292), Majapahit (1292–1527)

Peninsular Southeast Asia

Cambodia

- Chenla (630 – 802)
- Khmer Empire (802–1431)

Vietnam (544–1427)

- Anterior Lý dynasty and Triệu Việt Vương
- Third Chinese domination,
- Khúc Family
- Dương Đình Nghệ
- Kiều Công Tiễn
- Ngô dynasty
- The 12 Lords Rebellion
- Đinh dynasty
- Prior Lê dynasty
- Lý dynasty
- Trần dynasty
- Hồ dynasty
- Fourth Chinese domination

=== Tibetan periods ===
- Neolithic Tibet
- Zhangzhung (c. 500 BC - 625 AD)
- Yarlung Dynasty (127 BC - 842 AD)
  - Tibetan Empire (618 - 842)
- Era of Fragmentation (842 - 1240)
- Tibet under Yuan rule (1240 -1354)
- Phagmodrupa dynasty (1354 – 1618)
- Rinpungpa dynasty (1435 – 1565)
- Tsangpa dynasty (1565 – 1642)
- Khoshut Khanate (1642 – 1717)
- Tibet under Qing rule (1720 - 1912)
- Unrecognized Tibet (1912 - 1951)
- Tibet under the Peoples Republic of China (1951 - present)

== European periods ==
- Bronze Age Europe (c. 3000 BC – c. 1050 BC)
  - Aegean Civilization (Crete, Greece and Near East; c. 3000 BC – c. 1050 BC) (Note: The area had settlements as far back as 9000 BC; see Timeline of ancient Greece.)
- Iron Age Europe (c. 1050 BC – c. 500 AD)
  - Early Iron Age (c. 1050 BC – 776 BC) – part of the Greek Dark Ages
  - Classical antiquity (776 BC – 476 AD)
    - Archaic Greece (776 BC – 480 BC) – begins with the First Olympiad, traditionally dated 776 BC
    - Classical Greece (480 BC – 338 BC)
    - Macedonian era (338 BC – 323 BC)
    - Hellenistic Greece (323 BC – 146 BC)
    - Late Roman Republic (147 BC – 27 BC)
    - Principate of the Roman Empire (27 BC – 284 AD)
  - Late antiquity (3rd–7th centuries AD)
  - Migration Period (Europe, 300 AD – 700 AD)
- Middle Ages (Europe, 476–1453)
  - Byzantine era (330–1453)
  - Al Andalus (Iberian Peninsula, 711-1492)
  - Early Middle Ages (Europe, 476–1066)
    - Viking Age (Scandinavia, Europe, 793–1066)
  - High Middle Ages (Europe, 1066 – c. 1300)
  - Late Middle Ages (Europe, c. 1300 – 1453)
  - The Renaissance (Europe, c. 1300 – c. 1601)
- Early modern period (Europe, 1453–1789)
  - Age of Discovery (or Exploration) (Europe, c. 1400 – 1770)
  - Polish Golden Age (Poland, 1507–1572)
  - Golden Age of Piracy (1650–1730)
  - Tudor period (England, 1485–1603)
    - Elizabethan era (England, 1558–1603)
  - Stuart period (British Isles, 1603–1714)
    - Jacobean era (British Isles, 1603–1625)
    - Caroline era (British Isles, 1625–1649)
    - British Interregnum (British Isles, 1649–1660)
    - Stuart Restoration (British Isles, 1660–1714)
      - Carolean era (British Isles, 1660–1685)
  - Protestant Reformation (Europe, 16th century)
  - Classicism (Europe, 16th – 18th centuries)
  - Industrious Revolution, (Europe, 16th – 18th centuries)
  - Petrine Era (Russia, 1689–1725)
  - Age of Enlightenment (or Reason) (Europe, 18th century)
  - Scientific Revolution (Europe, 18th century)
- Long nineteenth century (1789–1914)
  - Georgian era (the United Kingdom, 1714–1830)
  - Industrial Revolution (Europe, United States, and elsewhere 18th and 19th centuries, though with its beginnings in Britain)
  - Age of European colonialism and imperialism
    - Colonial period: European colonization of the Americas, Scramble for Africa, and Western imperialism in Asia
  - Romantic era (1770–1850)
  - Napoleonic era (1799–1815)
  - Victorian era (the United Kingdom, 1837–1901); British hegemony (1815–1914) much of world, around the same time period.
  - Belle Époque (Europe, primarily France, 1871–1914)
  - Edwardian era (the United Kingdom, 1901–1914)
- WWI, Interwar period, and WWII (1914–1945)
- Cold War (1945–1991)
- Post–Cold War era (1991–present)

== Oceanian periods ==
=== Australian periods ===
- Ancient Australia, History of Indigenous Australians (between 65,000 and 50,000 BC – 1788 AD)
- Age of Discovery, European maritime exploration of Australia (1606–1802)
- Convict era (1788–1868)
- Victorian era (1837–1901)
- Federation era (1890–1918)
- World War II (1939–1945)
- Second Elizabethan era (1952–2022)

== See also ==
- Geologic time scale
- List of fossil sites with link directory
- Orders of magnitude (time)
- Periodization for a discussion of the tendency to try to fit history into non-overlapping periods
  - List of archaeological periods
  - List of timelines around the world
- Time
  - Planck Time
