= Miaolingian =

Third epoch of the Cambrian period

- ~506.5 – ~497 Ma
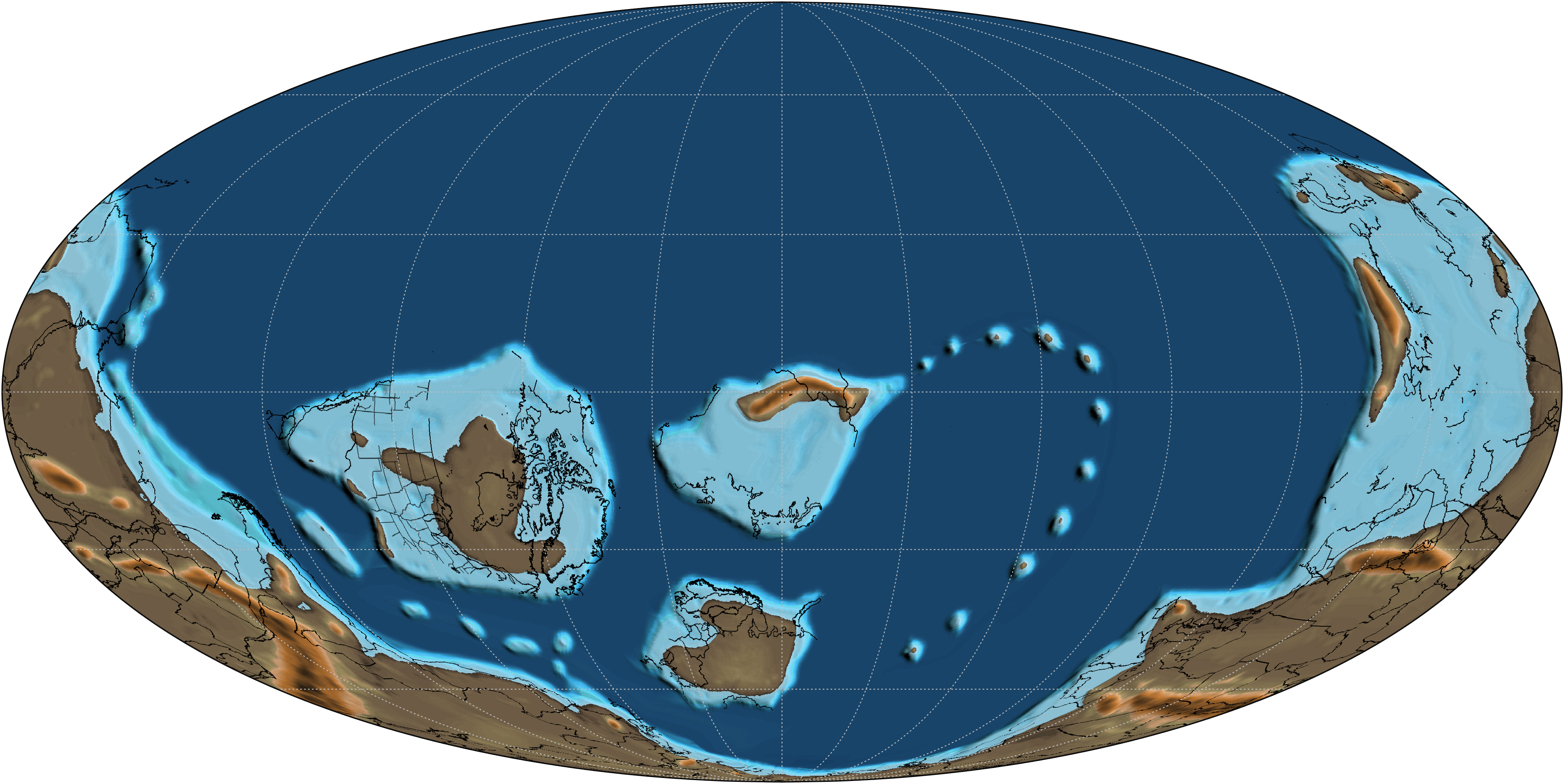
- A map of Earth as it appeared 505 million years ago during the Miaolingian Series, Wuliuan Stage

Chronology
← / Orsten Fauna; ← / Dresbachian extinction; ← / Burgess Shale; ← / Kaili biota; ← / Archaeocyatha extinction; ← / Emu Bay Shale; ← / Sirius Passet biota; ← / Chengjiang biota; ← / First Trilobites; ← / SSF diversification, first brachiopods & archaeocyatha; ← / First halkieriids, mollusсs, hyoliths SSF; ← / Baykonurian glaciation
Major glacial period
Subdivision of the Cambrian according to the ICS, as of 2024. Vertical axis scale: Millions of years ago

Etymology
- Name formality: Formal
- Name ratified: June 25, 2018
- Former name(s): Cambrian Series 3

Usage information
- Celestial body: Earth
- Regional usage: Global (ICS)
- Time scale(s) used: ICS Time Scale

Definition
- Chronological unit: Epoch
- Stratigraphic unit: Series
- Time span formality: Formal
- Lower boundary definition: FAD of the Trilobite Oryctocephalus indicus.
- Lower boundary GSSP: Wuliu-Zengjiayan, Guizhou, China; 26°44.843′N 108°24.830′E
- Lower GSSP ratified: June 25, 2018
- Upper boundary definition: FAD of the Trilobite Glyptagnostus reticulatus
- Upper boundary GSSP: Paibi section, Paibi, Hunan, China; 28°23.37′N 109°31.54′E
- Upper GSSP ratified: 2003

The Miaolingian or Mid-Late Cambrian is the third Series of the Cambrian Period, and was formally named in 2018. It lasted from about 506.5 to 497 million years ago and is divided in ascending order into 3 stages: the Wuliuan, Drumian, and Guzhangian. The Miaolingian is preceded by the unnamed Cambrian Series 2 and succeeded by the Furongian series.

It is named after the Miaoling Mountains in southeastern Guizhou Province, China.

== Definition ==
A number of proposals for fossils and type sections were made before it was formally ratified in 2018. The most promising fossil markers were seen to be the respective first appearances of either trilobite species Ovatoryctocara granulata or Oryctocephalus indicus, which both have an age close to 506.5 million years ago. After some deliberation, the FAD of Oryctocephalus indicus was chosen to be the lower boundary marker, and the GSSP was placed in the Kaili Formation, Wuliu-Zengjiayan, Guizhou, China.

The Miaolingian-Furongian boundary has the same definition as the Paibian Stage. It is defined as the first appearance of Glyptagnostus reticulatus around 497 million years ago.

== Subdivision ==
The Miaolingian is subdivided into the following stages:

Epoch / Series	Age / Stage	Age lower boundary (mya)
Furongian
Furongian	Stage 10	491
Furongian	Jiangshanian	494.2
Furongian	Paibian	497
Miaolingian
Miaolingian	Guzhangian	500.5
Miaolingian	Drumian	504.5
Miaolingian	Wuliuan	506.5
Series 2
Series 2	Stage 4	514.5
Series 2	Stage 3	521

The Ordian stage, which is use in Australian chronostratigraphical scale, was originally supposed to be the lowest stage of the Miaolingian, but may belong to upper Series 2. As of 2024, the base of the Ordian is not defined yet.

== Major events ==
At the Cambrian Series 2–Miaolingian boundary, the first major trilobite extinction, known as the Olenellid Biomere boundary, occurred. In particular, trilobites of the families Ollenellidae and Redlichiidae have been extinct in Laurentia and South China, respectively. The first O. indicus appear after this global extinction, and in areas where O. indicus fossils are absent, the Series 2–Miaolingian boundary is determined by chemostratigraphic data.

== Paleontology ==
Benthic graptolites have reached a wide distribution in the Miaolingian. Encrusting colonies of the Rhabdopleuridae and erect growing branching colonies of the Dithecodendridae families evolved already at the beginning of the Miaolingian. The most common Wuliuan graptolite genus is Sphenoecium, whose robust colonies were found all over the world.
