= Furongian =

Fourth and final epoch and series of the Cambrian

- ~497 – 486.85 ± 1.5 Ma
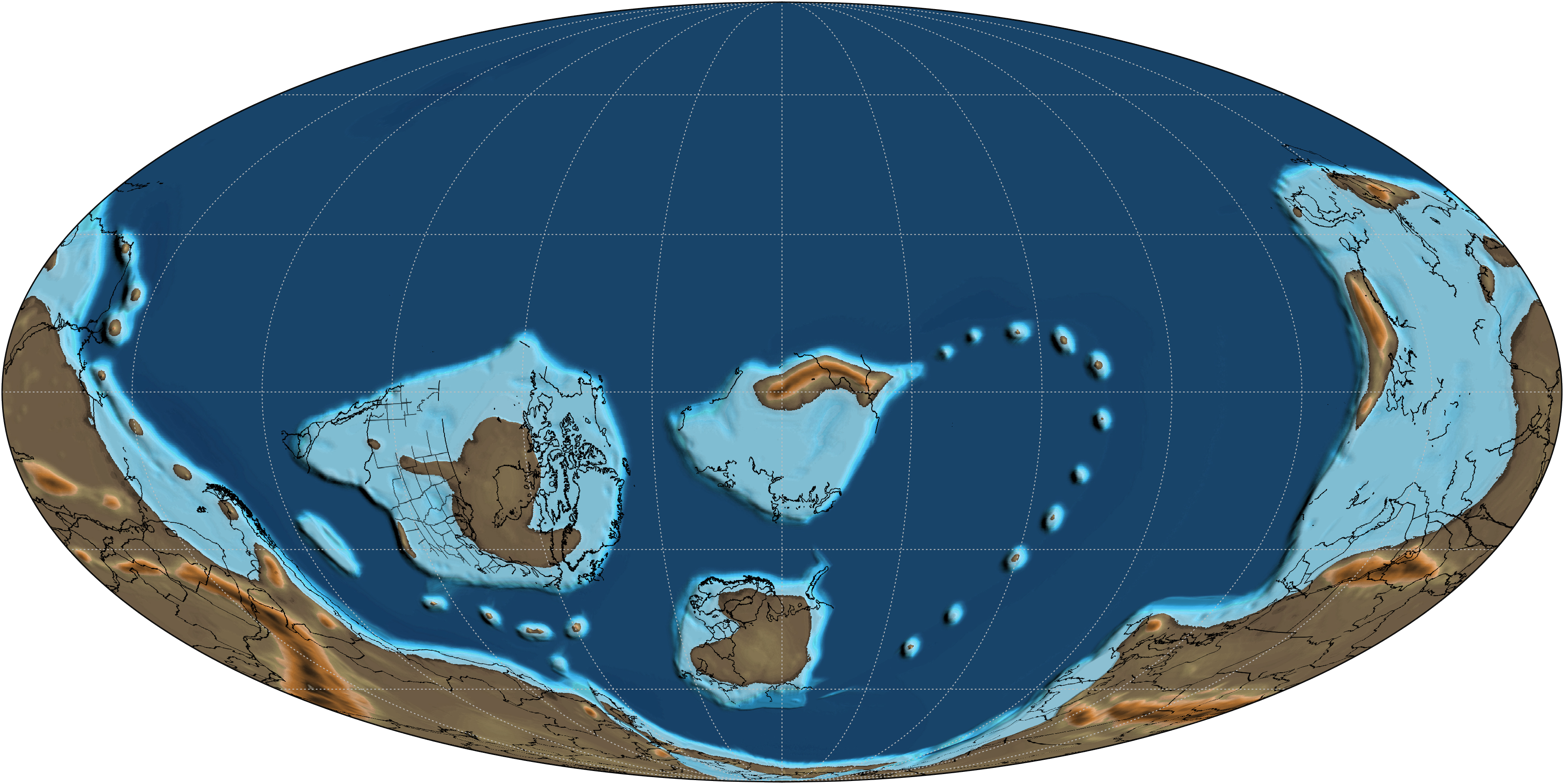
- A map of Earth as it appeared 495 million years ago during the Furongian Series, Paibian Stage

Chronology
← / Orsten Fauna; ← / Dresbachian extinction; ← / Burgess Shale; ← / Kaili biota; ← / Archaeocyatha extinction; ← / Emu Bay Shale; ← / Sirius Passet biota; ← / Chengjiang biota; ← / First Trilobites; ← / SSF diversification, first brachiopods & archaeocyatha; ← / First halkieriids, mollusсs, hyoliths SSF; ← / Baykonurian glaciation
Major glacial period
Subdivision of the Cambrian according to the ICS, as of 2024. Vertical axis scale: Millions of years ago

Etymology
- Name formality: Formal
- Name ratified: 2003
- Former name(s): Cambrian Series 4

Usage information
- Celestial body: Earth
- Regional usage: Global (ICS)
- Time scale(s) used: ICS Time Scale

Definition
- Chronological unit: Epoch
- Stratigraphic unit: Series
- First proposed by: Shanchi et al., 2002
- Time span formality: Formal
- Lower boundary definition: FAD of the Trilobite Glyptagnostus reticulatus
- Lower boundary GSSP: Paibi section, Paibi, Hunan, China; 28.3895°N 109.5257°E
- Lower GSSP ratified: 2003
- Upper boundary definition: FAD of the Conodont Iapetognathus fluctivagus.
- Upper boundary GSSP: Greenpoint section, Green Point, Newfoundland, Canada; 49.6829°N 57.9653°W
- Upper GSSP ratified: 2000

The Furongian or Late Cambrian is the fourth and final epoch and series of the Cambrian. It lasted from 497 to 486.85 million years ago. It succeeds the Miaolingian series of the Cambrian and precedes the Lower Ordovician Tremadocian Stage. It is subdivided into three stages: the Paibian, Jiangshanian and the unnamed 10th stage of the Cambrian.

== History and naming ==
The Furongian was also known as the Cambrian Series 4, and the name replaced the older term Upper Cambrian and equivalent to the local term Hunanian. The present name was ratified by the International Commission on Stratigraphy in 2003. Fúróng (芙蓉) means 'lotus' in Mandarin and refers to Hunan which is known as the "lotus state".

== Definition ==
The lower boundary is defined in the same way as the GSSP of the Paibian Stage. Both begin with the first appearance of the trilobite Glyptagnostus reticulatus around 497 million years ago. The upper boundary is the lower boundary and GSSP of the Tremadocian Stage which is the first appearance of the conodont Iapetognathus fluctivagus around 486.85 million years ago.

== Subdivisions ==
The following table shows the subdivisions of the Furongian series/epoch:

Series	Stage	Age (Ma)
Lower Ordovician
Lower Ordovician	Floian	477.1
Lower Ordovician	Tremadocian	486.85
Furongian
Furongian	Stage 10	491
Furongian	Jiangshanian	494.2
Furongian	Paibian	497
Miaolingian
Miaolingian	Guzhangian	500.5
Miaolingian	Drumian	504.5
Miaolingian	Wuliuan	506.5

== Biostratigraphy ==
The base of two of three stages of the Furongian are defined as the first appearance of a trilobite. The base of the Paibian is the first appearance of Glyptagnostus reticulatus and the base of the Jiangshanian is the first appearance of Agnostotes orientalis. The still unnamed Cambrian Stage 10 might be defined as the first appearance of Lotagnostus americanus or the conodont Eoconodontus notchpeakensis.

The Furongian can be divided into a number of trilobite zones:

Series	Stage	Trilobite zone	Trilobite GSSP
Furongian	Stage 10	Saukia zone (upper part), Eurekia apopsis zone, Tangshanaspis Zone, Parakoldinioidia zone, Symphysurina zone	Lotagnostus americanus (undecided)
Furongian	Jiangshanian	Ellipsocephaloides zone, Saukia zone (lower part)	Agnostotes orientalis
Furongian	Paibian	? (?)	Glyptagnostus reticulatus
Furongian	Paibian	Aphelaspis Zone	Glyptagnostus reticulatus

== Major events ==
At the beginning of the Furongian epoch, the Guzhangian–Paibian extinction ended. Species diversity, which had decreased by 45%, returned to its previous level at the very beginning of the Jiangshanian age. The ensuing Jiangshanian extinction reduced species diversity by 55.2% and was followed by an interval of relatively small fluctuations in species richness, which ended shortly after the beginning of the Ordovician.

Steptoean positive carbon isotope excursion (SPICE) occurred in close proximity in time to the Miaolingian–Furongian boundary (and, accordingly, the Guzhangian–Paibian boundary). This event is recorded on almost all Cambrian paleocontinents, but its exact causes are not fully understood. It is assumed that it may be associated with the Sauk megasequence, which in turn is associated with sea level changes; decrease in oxygen or occurrence of euxinic conditions in ocean waters; or the trilobite biomere turnover.

From the Furongian to the Early Ordovician, around 495-470 Ma, the mantle plume activity, known as the Ollo de Sapo magmatic event, occurred on the North-Western territory of the Gondwana which is now the Iberian Peninsula.

== Paleontology ==
Researchers have been noted that the significant macroscopic soft-bodied animals that lived between the Cambrian Explosion and the Great Ordovician Biodiversification Event were not discovered. In 2019, this time interval was named the Furongian Biodiversity Gap by Harper et al. This gap has been characterized as probably caused by lack of rocks, environmental events or a specific palaeogeography and extreme climates of the late Cambrian. However, a review of the literature and locations with Cambrian deposits showed that the gap is caused by the insufficient presence of Furongian deposits in sufficiently studied areas, as well as the lack of attention to fossils of this interregnum. Later discoveries of the Furongian deposits in South China have allowed for a better understanding of the biostratigraphy and fluctuations in species diversity of this epoch.

8502 specimens of trilobite-agnostoid fauna have been collected from the Furongian strata of the Alum Shale Formation of Bornholm, Denmark. Described gerena include Ctenopyge, Eurycare, Leptoplastus, Olenus, Parabolina, Peltura, Protopeltura, Sphaerophthalmus, Lotagnostus and Triangulopyge. Benthic graptolites, including genera Rhabdopleura, Dendrograptus, Callograptus and Siberiograptus, were found in the Furongian sediments of South China.
