= Guzhangian =

Seventh stage of the Cambrian and third stage of the Miaolingian

- ~500.5 – ~497 Ma

Chronology
← / Orsten Fauna; ← / Burgess Shale; ← / Kaili biota; ← / Archaeocyatha extinction; ← / Emu Bay Shale; ← / Sirius Passet biota; ← / Chengjiang biota; ← / First Trilobites; ← / SSF diversification, first brachiopods & archaeocyatha; ← / First halkieriids, mollusсs, hyoliths SSF; ← / Baykonurian glaciation; ← / Dresbachian extinction
Major Glacial period
Subdivision of the Cambrian according to the ICS, as of 2024. Vertical axis scale: Millions of years ago

Etymology
- Name formality: Formal
- Name ratified: 2008
- Former name(s): Cambrian Stage 7

Usage information
- Celestial body: Earth
- Regional usage: Global (ICS)
- Time scale(s) used: ICS Time Scale

Definition
- Chronological unit: Age
- Stratigraphic unit: Stage
- First proposed by: Shanchi et al., 2007
- Time span formality: Formal
- Lower boundary definition: FAD of the Trilobite Lejopyge laevigata
- Lower boundary GSSP: Luoyixi section, Luoyixi, Guzhang, Hunan, China; 28.7200°N 109.9647°E
- Lower GSSP ratified: 2008
- Upper boundary definition: FAD of the Trilobite Glyptagnostus reticulatus
- Upper boundary GSSP: Paibi section, Paibi, Hunan, China; 28.3895°N 109.5257°E
- Upper GSSP ratified: 2003

The Guzhangian is an uppermost stage of the Miaolingian Series of the Cambrian. It follows the Drumian Stage and precedes the Paibian Stage of the Furongian Series. The base is defined as the first appearance of the trilobite Lejopyge laevigata around 500.5 million years ago. The Guzhangian-Paibian boundary is marked by the first appearance of the trilobite Glyptagnostus reticulatus around 497 million years ago.

The name Guzhangian is derived from Guzhang County, Hunan Province, China.

== GSSP ==
The GSSP is defined in the Huaqiao Formation in Hunan. The precise base of the Guzhangian is a limestone layer 121.3 m above the base Huaqiao Formation (花桥组) at the Louyixi section (28.7200°N 109.9647°E), where Lejopyge laevigata has its first appearance.

== Paleogeography ==
It is assumed that in the Guzhangian the distance between the Earth and the Moon was 370,180 ± 1220 km (today, for comparison, it is 384,000 km). The length of an earthly day at that time was about 21.58 hours.

== Major events ==
The species radiation occurred in the interval from the middle–late Drumian to middle Guzhangian. The extinction began in the middle of Guzhangian and lasted 3 million years until the middle of the Paibian age. As a result of this extinction, species diversity was reduced by 45%. Two phases of extinction can be traced in the sediments of South China: the first, with a slight decline in species, lasted about 1.8 million years; the second, with a sharper decline in richness, lasted 1.2 million years, more in the Paibian. After the extinction, species diversity returned to its previous level. From the Guzhangian to Jiangshanian, the oceans experienced a gradual depletion of oxygen, which affected bottom-dwelling inhabitants. This process and the SPICE event, associated with it, likely became the cause of the extinction.
