= Drumian =

Second age of the Miaolingian epoch

- ~504.5 – ~500.5 Ma
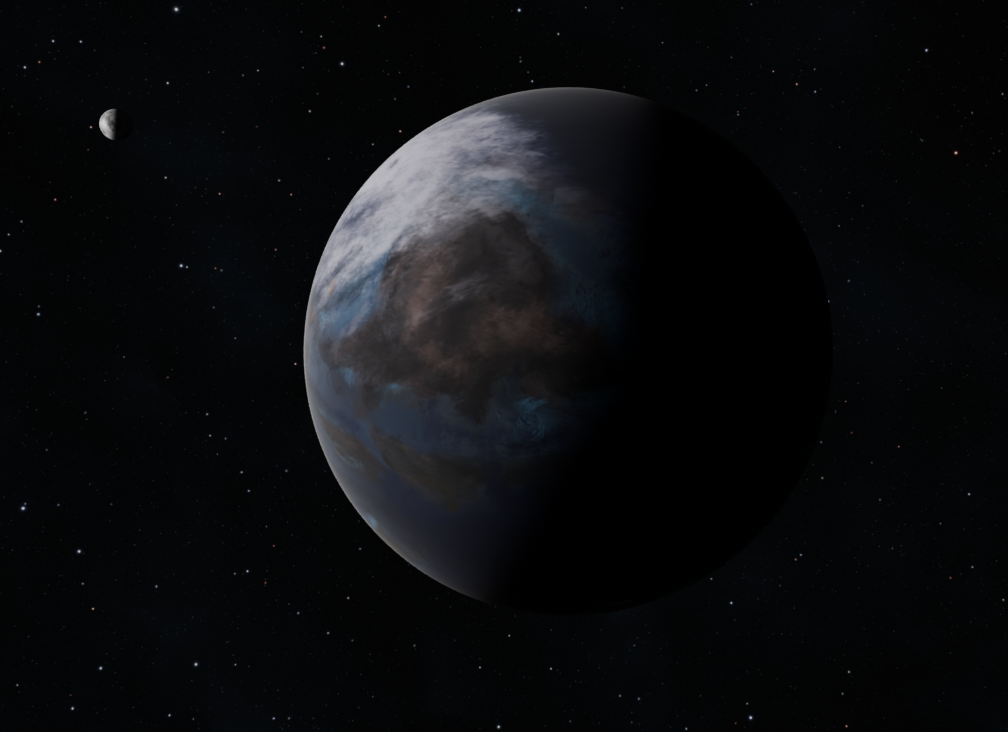
- A render of Laurentia during the Drumian

Chronology
← / Orsten Fauna; ← / Dresbachian extinction; ← / Burgess Shale; ← / Kaili biota; ← / Archaeocyatha extinction; ← / Emu Bay Shale; ← / Sirius Passet biota; ← / Chengjiang biota; ← / First Trilobites; ← / SSF diversification, first brachiopods & archaeocyatha; ← / First halkieriids, mollusсs, hyoliths SSF; ← / Baykonurian glaciation
Major glacial period
Subdivision of the Cambrian according to the ICS, as of 2024. Vertical axis scale: Millions of years ago

Etymology
- Name formality: Formal
- Name ratified: 2006
- Former name(s): Cambrian Stage 6

Usage information
- Celestial body: Earth
- Regional usage: Global (ICS)
- Time scale(s) used: ICS Time Scale

Definition
- Chronological unit: Age
- Stratigraphic unit: Stage
- First proposed by: Babcock et al., 2006
- Time span formality: Formal
- Lower boundary definition: FAD of the Trilobite Ptychagnostus atavus
- Lower boundary GSSP: Drumian section, Wheeler Shale, Utah, U.S.A. 39.5117°N 112.9915°W
- Lower GSSP ratified: 2006
- Upper boundary definition: FAD of the Trilobite Lejopyge laevigata
- Upper boundary GSSP: Luoyixi section, Luoyixi, Guzhang, Hunan, China; 28.7200°N 109.9647°E
- Upper GSSP ratified: 2008

The Drumian is a stage of the Miaolingian Series of the Cambrian. It succeeds the Wuliuan and precedes the Guzhangian. The base is defined as the first appearance of the trilobite Ptychagnostus atavus around 504.5 million years ago. The top is defined as the first appearance of another trilobite, Lejopyge laevigata, around 500.5 million years ago.

== GSSP ==
The Global Boundary Stratotype Section and Point (GSSP) is defined in the Drumian section (39.5117°N 112.9915°W) in the Drum Mountains, Millard County, Utah, United States. The stage was also named after the Drum Mountains. The section is an outcrop of the Wheeler Formation, a succession of calcareous shales. The precise base of the Drumian is a laminated limestone 62 m (203 ft) above the base of the Wheeler Formation.

== Major events ==
The Cambrian Drumian carbon isotope excursion (DICE) event is associated with the beginning of this age. The cause of this event was the shallowing of anoxic deep waters simultaneously with their transgression. DICE hampered the recovery of reef ecosystems already affected by the early–middle Cambrian mass extinctions. In the middle–late Drumian there was a radiation interval before the next extinction event.

== Paleontology ==
Numerous sponges, palaeoscolecids and euarthropods (including radiodonts) are known from the Drumian deposits.
