= Cambrian Series 2 =

Unnamed 2nd series of the Cambrian

- ~521 – ~506.5 Ma
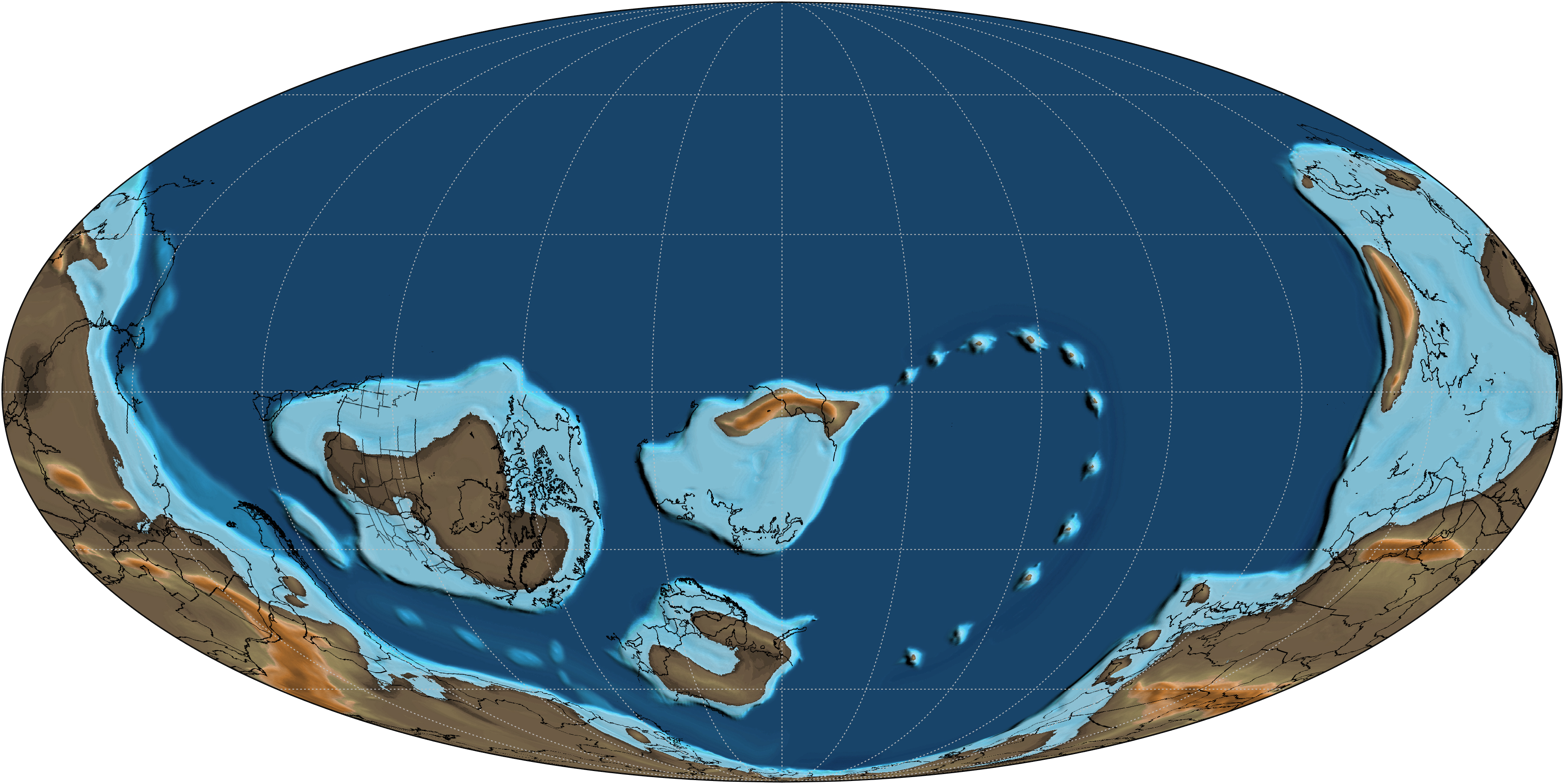
- A map of Earth 515 million years ago during the Cambrian's 2nd series, Stage 3

Chronology
| ← / Orsten Fauna; ← / Dresbachian extinction; ← / Burgess Shale; ← / Kaili biota; ← / Archaeocyatha extinction; ← / Emu Bay Shale; ← / Sirius Passet biota; ← / Chengjiang biota; ← / First Trilobites; ← / SSF diversification, first brachiopods & archaeocyatha; ← / First halkieriids, mollusсs, hyoliths SSF; ← / Baykonurian glaciation |
Major glacial period
Subdivision of the Cambrian according to the ICS, as of 2024. Vertical axis scale: Millions of years ago

Etymology
- Name formality: Informal

Usage information
- Celestial body: Earth
- Regional usage: Global (ICS)
- Time scale(s) used: ICS Time Scale

Definition
- Chronological unit: Epoch
- Stratigraphic unit: Series
- Time span formality: Formal
- Lower boundary definition: Not formally defined
- Lower boundary definition candidates: FAD of Trilobites
- Lower boundary GSSP candidate section(s): None
- Lower GSSP ratified: Not formally defined
- Upper boundary definition: FAD of Oryctocephalus indicus.
- Upper boundary GSSP: Wuliu-Zengjiayan, Guizhou, China; 26.0807°N 108.4138°E
- Upper GSSP ratified: June 25, 2018

Cambrian Series 2 or Mid-Early Cambrian is the unnamed 2nd series of the Cambrian. It lies above the Terreneuvian series and below the Miaolingian. Series 2 has not been formally defined by the International Commission on Stratigraphy, lacking a precise lower boundary and subdivision into stages. The proposed lower boundary is the first appearance of trilobites which is estimated to be around 521 million years ago.

== Naming ==
The International Commission on Stratigraphy has not named the 2nd series of the Cambrian yet. In part the new name will replace the older terms "Lower Cambrian" and "Early Cambrian". The nomenclature used in Siberia uses the term "Yakutian" for this series.

== Subdivisions ==
The 2nd series is currently subdivided by the ICS into two stages: Cambrian Stage 3 and Cambrian Stage 4. Both of these stages also lack formal definition. The Siberian nomenclature distinguishes three stages (lowest first): Atdabanian, Botomian and Toyonian. In general most subdivisions of this series rely on biostratigraphy of trilobite zones.

The Ordian stage, which is use in Australian chronostratigraphical scale, was originally supposed to be the lowest stage of the Miaolingian, but may belong to upper Series 2. As of 2024, the base of the Ordian is not defined yet.

== Biostratigraphy ==
The beginning of the 2nd series of the Cambrian is marked by the appearance of trilobites. Correlating this event on different continents has proven difficult and resolving this is essential for the definition of the lower boundary of this series. Currently the oldest trilobite known is Lemdadella which marks the beginning of the Fallotaspis zone.

The end of the 2nd series of the Cambrian is marked by the first major biotic extinction of the Paleozoic. Changes in ocean chemistry and the marine environment are posited as the most likely cause of this extinction. At the Series 2–Miaolingian boundary, the first major trilobite extinction, known as the Olenellid Biomere boundary, occurred. In particular, trilobites of the families Olenellidae and Redlichiidae have been extinct in Laurentia and South China, respectively. The first O. indicus appear after this global extinction, and in areas where O. indicus fossils are absent, the Series 2–Miaolingian boundary is determined by chemostratigraphic data.
