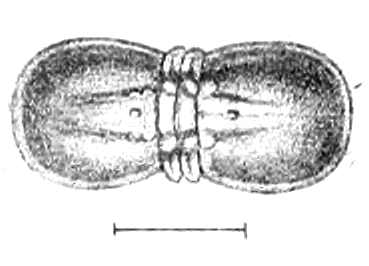
- Illustration of Lejopyge laevigata
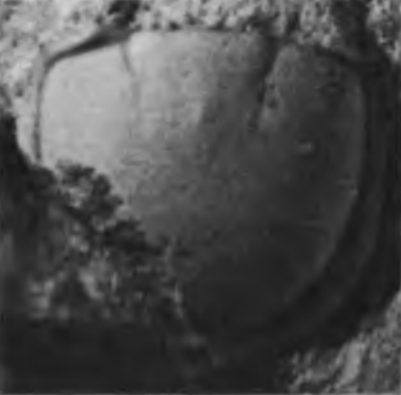
- Lejopyge laevigata pygidium

Scientific classification
- Kingdom: Animalia
- Phylum: Arthropoda
- Clade: †Artiopoda
- Class: †Trilobita (?)
- Order: †Agnostida
- Family: †Ptychagnostidae
- Genus: †Lejopyge
- Species: †L. laevigata

Binomial name
- †Lejopyge laevigata (Dalman, 1828)

Synonyms
- Agnostus laevigatus (Dalman, 1828); Battus laevigatus Dalman, 1828

= Lejopyge laevigata =

Lejopyge laevigata Temporal range: Guzhangian–Paibian

Extinct species of trilobite

Lejopyge laevigata is a species of agnostid trilobite belonging to the genus Lejopyge. It existed during the Guzhangian to the Paibian Age (around 500.5 to 497 million years ago) of the Cambrian. It has a cosmopolitan distribution and is an important index fossil in biostratigraphy.

== Description ==
Lejopyge laevigata exhibits a cephalon and pygidium that are smooth and almost featureless (effaced). Both possess axial furrows that gradually become shallower until they disappear distally. They surround the rear edges of the glabella (reaching about as far or a little past the basal glabellar lobes) and the anterior end of the central lobe of the pygidium. Basal furrows are also present. The genae ("cheeks") are usually smooth, but in extremely rare cases they may possess small pits (scrobicules) of moderate depth. The border around the pygidium is uniform in width at the back and narrows towards the front. Like all members of the suborder Agnostina, Lejopyge laevigata is completely blind.

== Distribution ==
Lejopyge laevigata has a cosmopolitan distribution, making it an ideal intercontinental correlation tool in biostratigraphy. It has been described from Argentina, Australia (including Tasmania), China, Denmark (including Greenland), Germany, India, Kazakhstan, Norway, Poland, Turkestan, Uzbekistan, Russia, Sweden, the United Kingdom, and the United States (including rare finds in Alaska).

== Taxonomy ==
Lejopyge laevigata is classified under the genus Lejopyge of the family Ptychagnostidae. It was originally described in 1828 by the Swedish naturalist Johan Wilhelm Dalman as Battus laevigatus. In a monograph on Bohemian trilobites, Prodrom einer Monographie der böhmischen Trilobiten (1847), the Czech fossil collector Ignaz Hawle and botanist August Carl Joseph Corda established the genus Lejopyge using B. laevigatus as the type species.

Lejopyge armata was formerly classified as a subspecies of Lejopyge laevigata. The former differs from the latter in having spines on both the cephalon and the pygidium, a characteristic unique to the entire genus. They are sometimes found together, but most collections are uniformly composed of either of them, which rules out sexual dimorphism as an explanation for the differences. Due to this, the American paleontologist Richard A. Robison separated Lejopyge armata from Lejopyge laevigata in 1984.

== Biostratigraphy ==
Lejopyge laevigata is used in biostratigraphy as an index fossil. Its first appearance at the GSSP section of the Huaqiao Formation in Hunan, China is defined as the beginning of the Guzhangian Age (around 500.5 million years ago) of the Miaolingian (Middle Cambrian). It has also been used as a zonal guide in various fossil localities around the world.
