= Paibian =

First age of the Furongian epoch

- ~497 – ~494.2 Ma
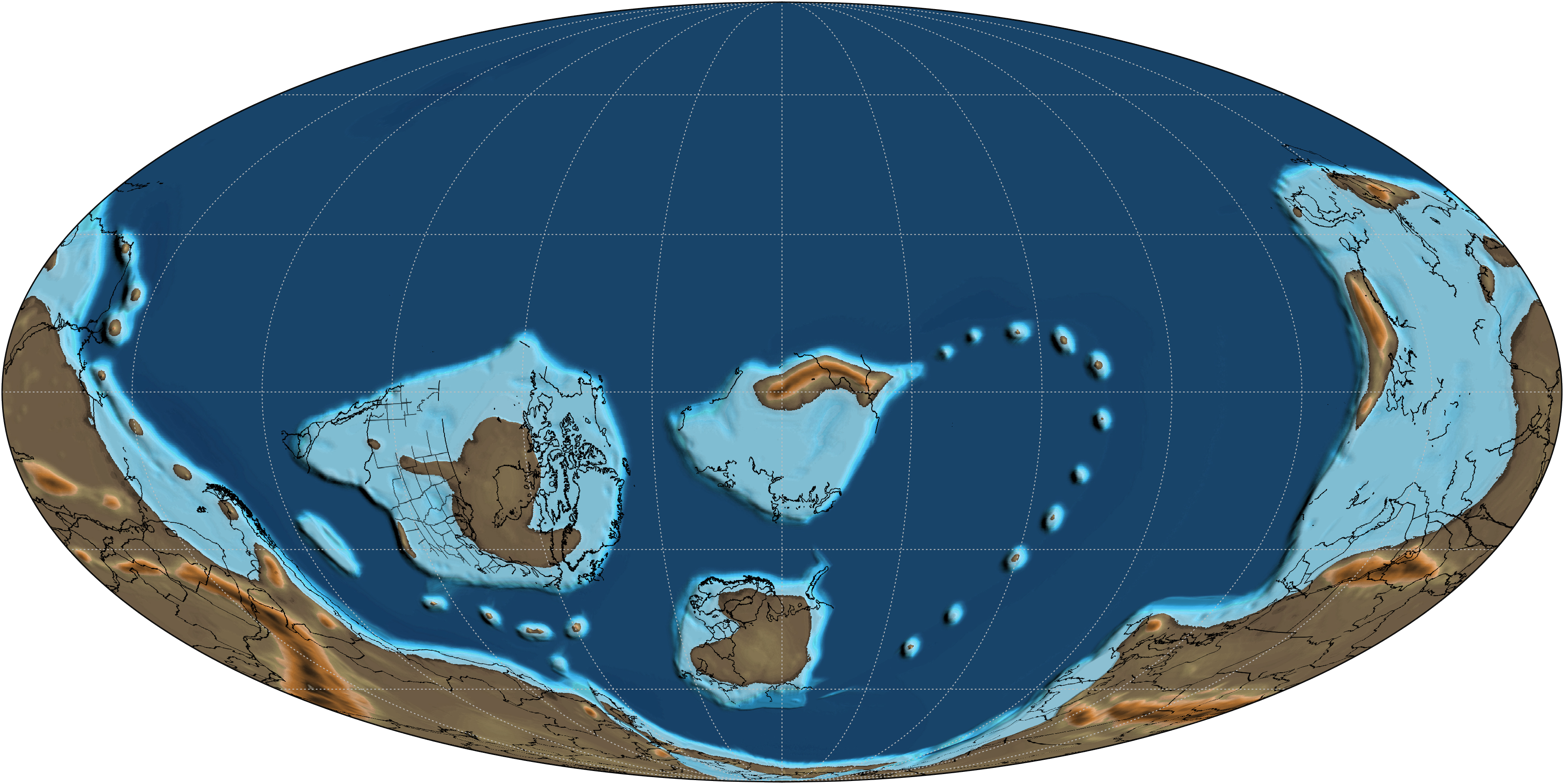
- Map of Earth 495 million years ago

Chronology
← / Orsten Fauna; ← / Dresbachian extinction; ← / Burgess Shale; ← / Kaili biota; ← / Archaeocyatha extinction; ← / Emu Bay Shale; ← / Sirius Passet biota; ← / Chengjiang biota; ← / First Trilobites; ← / SSF diversification, first brachiopods & archaeocyatha; ← / First halkieriids, mollusсs, hyoliths SSF; ← / Baykonurian glaciation
Major glacial period
Subdivision of the Cambrian according to the ICS, as of 2024. Vertical axis scale: Millions of years ago

Etymology
- Name formality: Formal
- Name ratified: 2003
- Former name(s): Cambrian Stage 8

Usage information
- Celestial body: Earth
- Regional usage: Global (ICS)
- Time scale(s) used: ICS Time Scale

Definition
- Chronological unit: Age
- Stratigraphic unit: Stage
- First proposed by: Shanchi et al., 2002
- Time span formality: Formal
- Lower boundary definition: FAD of the Trilobite Glyptagnostus reticulatus
- Lower boundary GSSP: Paibi section, Paibi, Hunan, China; 28.3895°N 109.5257°E
- Lower GSSP ratified: 2003
- Upper boundary definition: FAD of the Trilobite Agnostotes orientalis
- Upper boundary GSSP: Duibian B Section, Duibian, Zhejiang, China; 28.815967°N 118.614933°E
- Upper GSSP ratified: 2011

The Paibian is the lowest stage of the Furongian Series of the Cambrian System. The Paibian is also the first age of the Furongian Epoch of the Cambrian Period. It follows the Guzhangian (Miaolingian series of the Cambrian) and is succeeded by the Jiangshanian Stage. The base is defined as the first appearance of the trilobite Glyptagnostus reticulatus around 497 million years ago. The top, or the base of the Jiangshanian is defined as the first appearance of the trilobite Agnostotes orientalis around 494.2 million years ago.

== GSSP ==
The name is derived from Paibi, a village in Hunan, China. The GSSP is defined in the "Paibi section" (Wuling Mountains, Huayuan County), an outcrop of the Huaqiao Formation (花桥组). The base is the first occurrence of Glyptagnostus reticulatus which is 396 m above the base of the Huaqiao Formation at the type locality (28.3895°N 109.5257°E).

== Major events ==
At the turn of the Guzhangian and Paibian ages, an extinction event occurred that reduced the species richness by 45%. This event coincided with Marjuman extinction that can be traced to trilobite and brachiopod assemblages in Laurentia. Two phases of extinction can be traced in the sediments of South China: the first, with a slight decline in species, lasted in Guzhangian, about 1.8 million years; the second, with a sharper decline in richness, lasted 1.2 million years, more in the Paibian. After the extinction, species diversity returned to its previous level.

Steptoean positive carbon isotope excursion (SPICE) began around the Guzhangian-Paibian boundary. This event is associated with a global carbon-cycle perturbation. The driving mechanism of this change are not fully understood, but it is believed to be caused by the expansion of anoxic deep water into shallow regions. SPICE event had a noticeable impact on trilobites. A decrease in their diversity is observed at the beginning and at the termination of its interval, which coincides with the Laurentian End-Marjuman Biomere Extinction (EMBE) and the End-Steptoean Biomere Extinction (ESBE), respectively. The SPICE event was accompanied by cooling, which contributed to the recovery of ecosystems after its onset, but the further warming disrupted the circulation of ocean waters and triggered new redox changes that precipitated the ESBE.

== Paleontology ==
Agnostoid genera, including Glyptagnostus, Homagnostus, Pseudagnostus and Acmarhachis, are known from the Paibian deposits.
