= Agnostotes =

Agnostotes Temporal range: 501-499 mya Miaolingian(middle Cambrian

Scientific classification
- Domain: Eukaryota
- Kingdom: Animalia
- Phylum: Arthropoda
- Class: †Trilobita (?)
- Order: †Agnostida
- Family: †Diplagnostidae
- Genus: †Agnostotes; Öpik, 1963

Genus of trilobite

Agnostotes is a genus of artiopodan arthropod in the family Diplagnostidae of the order Agnostida. It was a widely distributed genus.

== Use in stratigraphy ==
The base of the Jiangshanian stage is the FAD of A. orientalis.
