= Cambrian Stage 10 =

Final stage of the Cambrian Period

- ~491 – 486.85 ± 1.5 Ma

Chronology
← / Orsten Fauna; ← / Burgess Shale; ← / Kaili biota; ← / Archaeocyatha extinction; ← / Emu Bay Shale; ← / Sirius Passet biota; ← / Chengjiang biota; ← / First Trilobites; ← / SSF diversification, first brachiopods & archaeocyatha; ← / First halkieriids, mollusсs, hyoliths SSF; ← / Baykonurian glaciation; ← / Dresbachian extinction
Major Glacial period
Subdivision of the Cambrian according to the ICS, as of 2024. Vertical axis scale: Millions of years ago

Etymology
- Name formality: Informal

Usage information
- Celestial body: Earth
- Regional usage: Global (ICS)
- Time scale(s) used: ICS Time Scale

Definition
- Chronological unit: Age
- Stratigraphic unit: Stage
- Time span formality: Formal
- Lower boundary definition: Not formally defined
- Lower boundary definition candidates: FAD of the Trilobite Lotagnostus americanus
- Lower boundary GSSP candidate section(s): Duibian, Zhejiang, China
- Upper boundary definition: FAD of the Conodont Iapetognathus fluctivagus.
- Upper boundary GSSP: Greenpoint section, Green Point, Newfoundland, Canada; 49.6829°N 57.9653°W
- Upper GSSP ratified: 2000

Stage 10 of the Cambrian is the still-unnamed third and final stage of the Furongian series. It follows the Jiangshanian and precedes the Ordovician Tremadocian Stage. The proposed lower boundary is the first appearance of the trilobite Lotagnostus americanus around 491 million years ago, but other fossils are also being discussed (see below). The upper boundary is defined as the appearance of the conodont Iapetognathus fluctivagus which marks the beginning of the Tremadocian and is radiometrically dated as 486.85 million years ago.

== Naming ==
The 10th stage of the Cambrian has not been formally named by the ICS yet, although a number of local names exist. Several authors favor the name "Lawsonian" after Lawson Cove, in the Wah Wah Mountains of Utah. The lower part of the North American Skullrockian Stage corresponds roughly to the Cambrian Stage 10. The name "Nelegerian", after the Neleger River in Yakutia, was also proposed in 2011.

== Stratotype ==
The ICS is still discussing which geological section and biostratigraphic marker will be used to define the base of the 10th Cambrian stage.

Likely candidates for the section are still investigated. A first proposal was a section near Duibian, Zhejiang province (China). Note recent publications favor Steamboat Pass in the House Range of Utah. If a conodont is used for the base the stage then many more sections would be likely candidates for the GSSP, e.g. in Australia, Kazakhstan and Canada.

Candidates for the biostratigraphic marker are the first appearance of a trilobite or conodont species. The trilobite Lotagnostus americanus was first suggested by the ICS, but has proven to be problematic. In 2006 another working group proposed the first appearance of Cordylodus andresi. The first appearance of Eoconodontus notchpeakensis is favored by many authors because it is globally widespread and is independent of facies (known from continental rise to peritidal environments).

The Eoconodontus notchpeakensis proposal would also incorporate a non-biostratigraphic marker to correlate the beginning of stage 10 globally. A carbon isotope excursion (the HERB-event) occurs in the lower part of the E. notchpeakensis range.

== Subdivisions ==
Cambrian Stage 10 can be subdivided using different biostratigraphic zones. Several conodont zone and subzones can be distinguished. The same is true for trilobites.
