= Galena Experiment =

The Galena Experiment is described as a period between 1807 and 1846 in the U.S. where the government granted mining permits to work a given area, and required workers to bring their ore to one of the officially licensed smelters, from whom the government collected 10% royalty. Initially, Federal revenues were enhanced; however, because of noncompliance on the sides of the miners, who evaded the licensed smelters; by the smelters, who did not pay the royalties; and the federal agents, who fraudulently sold mineral land at minimum prices as farmland, the system fell apart in the 1830s.
