= Paibi =

Paibi 排碧村
- Village
- Location in Hunan
- Coordinates: 28°22′52″N 109°32′19″E
- Country: People's Republic of China
- Province: Hunan
- Autonomous prefecture: Xiangxi Tujia and Miao Autonomous Prefecture
- County: Huayuan
- Township: Paibi Township

Paibi (Chinese: 排碧; pinyin: Páibì), a village in Paibi Township (排碧乡), Huayuan County, Xiangxi Tujia and Miao Autonomous Prefecture Hunan, China, is the location of the Global Boundary Stratotype Section and Point (GSSP) which marks the boundary between the third and Furongian epochs of the Cambrian Period on the geologic time scale. Paibi was selected over the Kyrshabakty River section, Malyi Karatau, Kazakhstan, and the GSSP was ratified by the International Union of Geological Sciences in late 2003. It established the first formally agreed upon subdivision of the Cambrian. The village gives its name to the Paibian Age in the Cambrian Period.

The Paibi section occurs within the Huaqiao Formation, which consists of a thick succession of carbonate beds deposited in the outer part of the Jiangnan Slope Belt, and extends from the middle Cambrian through the Lower Ordovician. It satisfies all the geological and biostratigraphic requirements for a GSSP, is readily accessible, and includes chemostratigraphic, palaeogeographic, facies-relationship, and sequence-stratigraphic information. The section lies at an elevation of 774 metres.

The evolution of Glyptagnostus reticulatus (an agnostoid trilobite) from more basal species of the genus Glyptagnostus marks the boundary. Other markers which occur near the boundary include the first appearance of the conodont Westergaardodina proligula and the Steptoean positive carbon isotope excursion, a large positive shift in carbon-13 isotopes.
