= Cambrian Stage 2 =

Second and last age of the Terreneuvian Epoch

- ~529 – ~521 Ma

Chronology
← / Orsten Fauna; ← / Burgess Shale; ← / Kaili biota; ← / Archaeocyatha extinction; ← / Emu Bay Shale; ← / Sirius Passet biota; ← / Chengjiang biota; ← / First Trilobites; ← / SSF diversification, first brachiopods & archaeocyatha; ← / First halkieriids, mollusсs, hyoliths SSF; ← / Baykonurian glaciation; ← / Dresbachian extinction
Major Glacial period
Subdivision of the Cambrian according to the ICS, as of 2024. Vertical axis scale: Millions of years ago

Etymology
- Name formality: Informal

Usage information
- Celestial body: Earth
- Regional usage: Global (ICS)
- Time scale(s) used: ICS Time Scale

Definition
- Chronological unit: Age
- Stratigraphic unit: Stage
- Time span formality: Formal
- Lower boundary definition: Not formally defined
- Lower boundary definition candidates: First appearance of small shelly fauna or Archaeocyathids
- Lower boundary GSSP candidate section(s): None
- Lower GSSP ratified: Not formally defined
- Upper boundary definition: Not formally defined
- Upper boundary definition candidates: FAD of Trilobites
- Upper boundary GSSP candidate section(s): None
- Upper GSSP ratified: Not formally defined

Stage 2 of the Cambrian is the unnamed upper stage of the Terreneuvian Series. It lies atop the Fortunian and below Stage 3 of the Cambrian. It is commonly referred to as the Tommotian, after the Cambrian stratigraphy of Siberia. Neither the upper nor lower boundary has yet been defined by the International Commission on Stratigraphy. The preferred definitions for the lower boundary are the first appearance of the molluscs Watsonella crosbyi or Aldanella attleborensis around 529 million years ago. The correlation between the lowest occurrences of A. attleborensis and W. crosbyi with the Zhujiaqing positive carbon isotope excursion (ZHUCE) has led to the conclusion that the combination of these two markers are a reliable indicator of the boundary between the Fortunian and Stage 2. The proposed upper boundary might be the first appearance of trilobites around 521 million years ago.

== Naming ==
The name "Laolinian" after the Laolin village in Yunnan, China, was proposed for the Stage 2 in 2012.

== Stratotype ==
Possible candidates for a GSSP include the first appearance of Watsonella crosbyi in the Zhujiaqing Formation (朱家庆组) in Yunnan, China or the Pestrotsvet Formation near the Aldan River on the Siberian Platform.
