= Jiangshanian =

Second age of the Furongian epoch

- ~494.2 – ~491 Ma
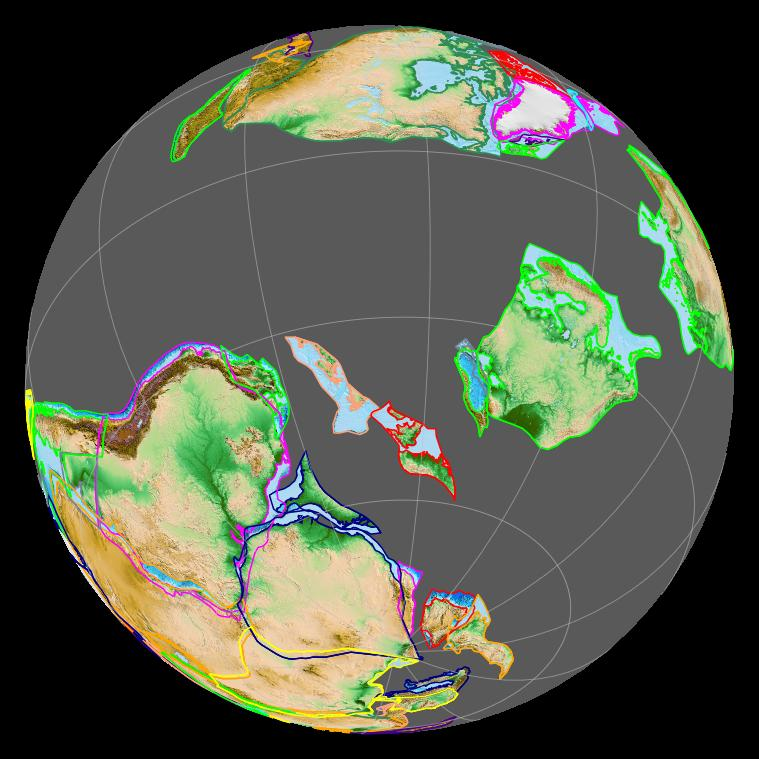
- Earth during the jiangshanian

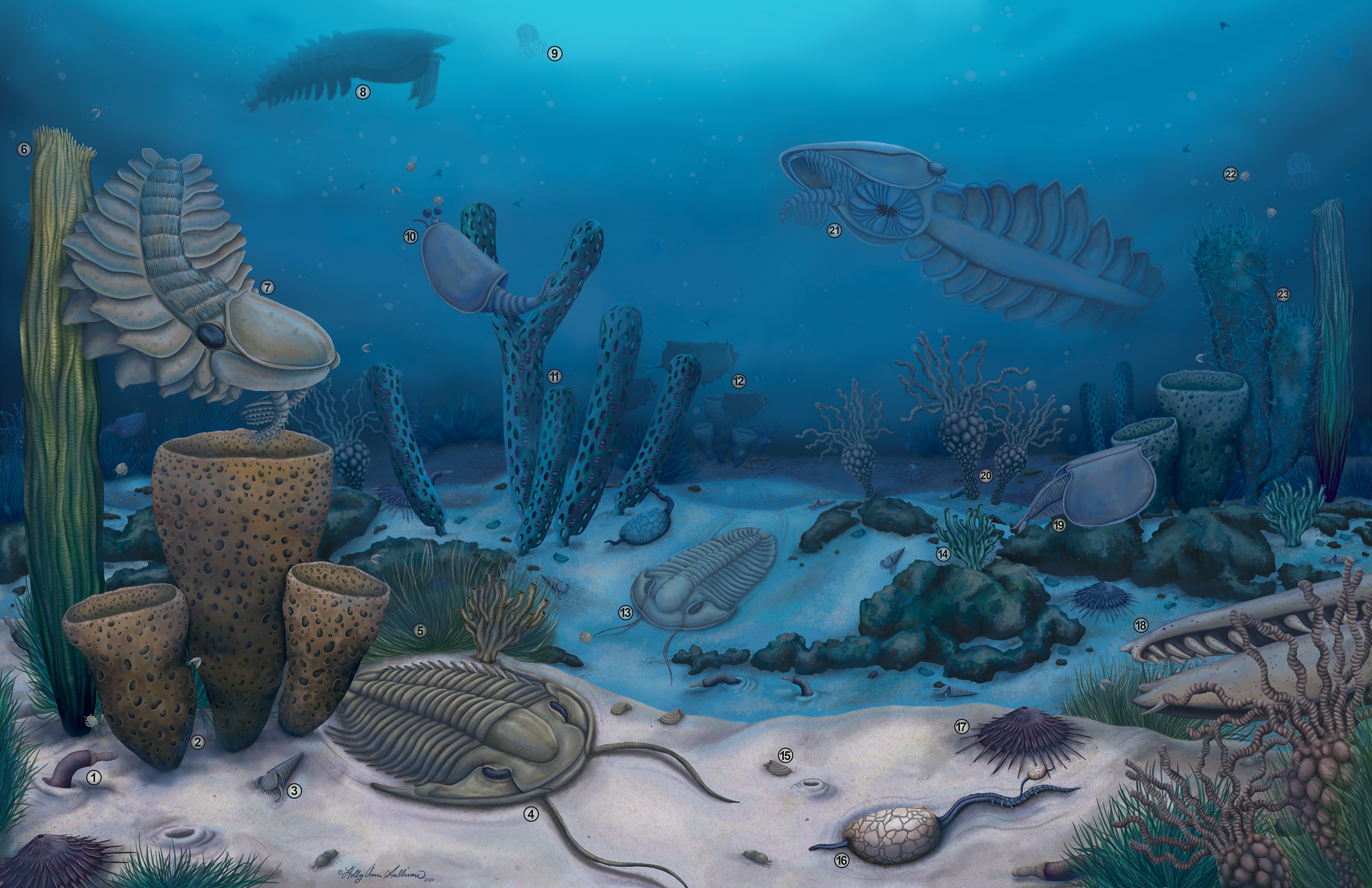

Chronology
← / Orsten Fauna; ← / Dresbachian extinction; ← / Burgess Shale; ← / Kaili biota; ← / Archaeocyatha extinction; ← / Emu Bay Shale; ← / Sirius Passet biota; ← / Chengjiang biota; ← / First Trilobites; ← / SSF diversification, first brachiopods & archaeocyatha; ← / First halkieriids, mollusсs, hyoliths SSF; ← / Baykonurian glaciation
Major glacial period
Subdivision of the Cambrian according to the ICS, as of 2024. Vertical axis scale: Millions of years ago

Etymology
- Name formality: Formal
- Name ratified: 2011
- Former name(s): Cambrian Stage 9

Usage information
- Celestial body: Earth
- Regional usage: Global (ICS)
- Time scale(s) used: ICS Time Scale

Definition
- Chronological unit: Age
- Stratigraphic unit: Stage
- Time span formality: Formal
- Lower boundary definition: FAD of the Trilobite Agnostotes orientalis
- Lower boundary GSSP: Duibian B Section, Duibian, Zhejiang, China; 28.815967°N 118.614933°E
- Lower GSSP ratified: 2011
- Upper boundary definition: Not formally defined
- Upper boundary definition candidates: FAD of the Trilobite Lotagnostus americanus
- Upper boundary GSSP candidate section(s): Duibian, Zhejiang, China

The Jiangshanian is the middle stage of the Furongian series. It follows the Paibian Stage and is succeeded by the still unnamed Stage 10 of the Cambrian. The base is defined as the first appearance of the trilobite Agnostotes orientalis which is estimated to be 494.2 million years ago. The Jiangshanian lasted until approximately 491 million years ago.

The Jiangshanian stage was named after Jiangshan, a city in China's Zhejiang province, where its GSSP was defined.

== Stratigraphy ==
The Global boundary Stratotype Section and Point (GSSP) of the Jiangshanian is the "Duibian B Section" (28.815967°N 118.614933°E), west of the village of Duibian (碓边), and 10 km north of Jiangshan. The outcrop belongs to the Huayansi Formation (华严寺组). The upper boundary (the base of the Stage 10) is not formally defined by ICS, but there is a proposal to set the first appearance of an agnostoid Lotagnostus americanus as its marker.

In 2012, international research group proposed the Kyrshabakty section in the Malyi Karatau Range, southern Kazakhstan, as a candidate for the Auxiliary boundary Stratotype Section and Point (ASSP) of the Jiangshanian. The proposal was approved by an overwhelming majority of votes by the International Subcommission on Cambrian Stratigraphy (ISCS). The section is situated near Kyrshabakty River, about 28 km north-east of the Zhanatas town. The first appearance datum (FAD) of Agnostotes orientalis is located at an altitude of 259 m above the base of the section, in the Zhumabay Formation, also known as Bestogai Formation. In 2021, the International Union of Geological Sciences (IUGS) proposed to deny the use of specific points and replace them by Standard Auxiliary Boundary Stratotypes (SABS) for more "flexible" correlations with GSSPs.

== Major events ==
At the beginning of the Jiangshanian, there was a peak in species diversity, comparable to that observed in the middle Guzhangian, before the Guzhangian–Paibian extinction. Jiangshanian extinction, which lasted approximately from 493.9 to 491.3 Ma, reduced species diversity by 55.2%. It was followed by an interval of relatively small fluctuations in species richness, which ended shortly after the beginning of the Ordovician.

== Paleontology ==
Nearly 50 fossil genera were found in the Jiangshanian deposits of the Sandu Formation in Guangxi, South China. Organisms presented by the algae, graptolites, the cnidarian Sphenothallus, one species of Palaeoscolecida, and arthropods, which include aglaspidid, mollisoniid, and "bivalved" forms. Rare hurdiids were discovered in the Jiangshanian strata in Sandu Formation and Wiśniówka Sandstone Formation in Poland. Trilobites Parabolina, Hedinaspis, Eugonocare and Cermatops, with agnostoid genera including Pseudagnostus and Rhaptagnostus, were collected from the Jiangshanian sediments of western Tasmania. Trilobite genera Monocheilus, Ptychaspis and Wilbernia are known from the Jiangshanian Honey Creek Formation in the Wichita Mountains, Oklahoma, USA.
