= Baykonur Formation =

Geological formation in Kazakhstan and Kyrgyzstan

- Stratigraphic range: Ediacaran; ~556–540 Ma
- Type: Geological formation
- Unit of: Ulutau Group
- Underlies: Koktal Formation Kurumsak Formation, Kurmenty Formation, Terreneuvian shale (unconformity)
- Overlies: Kurayly Formation, Aksumbe Formation, Dzakhbolot Formation, Tonian-Cryogenian boundary (unconformity)
- Thickness: up to 600 metres (1,970 ft)

Lithology
- Primary: Diamictite, shale
- Other: Phyllite, feldspar, dolomite, conglomerate

Location
- Region: Ulytau, Bolshoi Karatau, Aksu-Zhabagly, Middle Tian Shan, Kyrgyzstan-China border
- Country: Kazakhstan and Kyrgyzstan

Type section
- Named for: Baikonyr
- Region: Rang River, Kazakhstan

The Baykonur Formation is a geological formation of Neoproterozoic (Ediacaran) age which outcrops in Kazakhstan and Kyrgyzstan. It is correlated in age with the Hankalchough Formation in China where glaciation also occurred.

== History ==
The presence of diamictites was identified in the Baykonur Formation in 1924 by Dmitry Nalivkin, and the Baykonur Formation was studied for the first time by Ergaliev (1965). Chumakov (2009) and Chumakov (2011) standardised the stratigraphy of the Baykonur Formation and formalised the name of the formation.

== Geology ==
The Baykonur Formation is an upper unit of the Ulutau Group and it outcrops in the mountains of Kazakhstan and Kyrgyzstan towards the border with China. It was formed during a period of heavy glaciation known as the Baykonurian glaciation which spread for at least 1,600 kilometres (990 mi), and it has been posited as a contributor to the Cambrian explosion. During the Ordovician and Devonian, the Baykonur Formation experienced faulting and folding during the Caledonian orogeny.

The Baykonur Formation is formed of diamictite and phyllite with dropstones, a shale layer and in some sections a feldspar layer and conglomerate layers increasing in abundance towards the western sections; it has unconformities between its upper and lower boundaries with Terreneuvian shale and granosyenite of Tonian-Cryogenian boundary age respectively, although in places it does underlie the Koktal, Kurumsak, and Kurmenty Formation and conformably overlies the Kurayly, Aksumbe, and Dzakhbolot Formation. It is up to 600 metres (2,000 ft) in places with localised diamictite outcrops reaching 30 metres (98 ft) in thickness.

=== Age ===
The age of the Baykonur Formation was initially suggested to be Late Paleozoic age in 1924 before the date was suggested to be Cambrian age by Borovikov (1953) and then Precambrian age by Korolev (1963). This was then changed to ?Ediacaran to Early Cambrian age by Chumakov (2011). Alexeiv (2025) refined the age to 556–540 Ma.

== Paleogeography ==
The Baykonur Formation constitutes margins believed to be related to the northern and eastern edges of the Syrdarya and Tarim microcontinents.
