= Agnostotes orientalis =

Agnostotes orientalis Temporal range: Jiangshanian

Scientific classification
- Kingdom: Animalia
- Phylum: Arthropoda
- Clade: †Artiopoda
- Class: †Trilobita (?)
- Order: †Agnostida
- Family: †Diplagnostidae
- Genus: †Agnostotes
- Species: †A. orientalis

Binomial name
- †Agnostotes orientalis (Kobayashi, 1935)

Synonyms
- Agnostus (Ptychagnostus?) orientalis Kobayashi, 1935; Pseudoglyptagnostus clavatus Lu, 1964; Glyptagnostotes elegans Lazarenko, 1966; Agnostotes (Pseudoglyptagnostus) clavatus Lu in Lu & Lin, 1989; Agnostotes clavata Öpik in Peng, 1990; Agnostotes (Pseudoglyptagnostus) orientalis (Kobayashi, 1935)

Extinct species of trilobite

Agnostotes orientalis is a species of agnostid trilobite belonging to the genus Agnostotes. It existed during the Jiangshanian Age (494.2 million years ago) of the Cambrian. It is an important index fossil in biostratigraphy.

== Description ==
Agnostotes orientalis, like all members of the suborder Agnostina, possesses two thoracic segments, has a cephalon and pygidium that are more or less the same size and shape (isopygous), and is completely blind.

The axial lobe of the cephalon is narrow. At the front of the glabella is a notch (frontal sulcus), a characteristic unique to the species, making it easy to distinguish from other members of the genus. The posterior end of the axial lobe of the pygidium also widens significantly, another distinct characteristic of the species. Along the margins of the pygidium are a pair of very small backward-pointing spines. Both the pygidium and the cephalon are ornamented with small pits (scrobicules) and wrinkles, extending mostly inwards from the margins. These ornamentation are less numerous and distinct in younger specimens, increasing in number and depth as they grow. Older individuals also tend to have proportionally wider anterior ends of the pygidial axial lobe.

== Taxonomy ==
Agnostotes orientalis belongs to the genus Agnostotes of the family Diplagnostidae. It was first described in 1935 by the Japanese paleontologist Teiichi Kobayashi as Agnostus (Ptychagnostus?) orientalis. However, Kobayashi's holotype consisted only of a badly preserved external mold of a fragmentary pygidium. This resulted in numerous other junior synonyms being assigned to further discoveries. It was reassigned to the genus Agnostotes in 1963 by the Estonian-Australian paleontologist Armin Aleksander Öpik.

== Distribution ==
Agnostotes orientalis has been described from south China, southern Kazakhstan, Siberia, South Korea, and North America.

== Biostratigraphy ==
Agnostotes orientalis is used in biostratigraphy as an index fossil. Its first appearance at the GSSP section of the Huayansi Formation in western Zhejiang, China is defined as the beginning of the Jiangshanian Age (494.2 million years ago) of the Furongian Epoch (Upper Cambrian). Its first appearance datum (FAD) also coincides with the FAD of the ptychopariid trilobite Irvingella angustilimbata.
