= Onychomicrodictyon =

Onychomicrodictyon Temporal range: Toyonian

Scientific classification
- Domain: Eukaryota
- Kingdom: Animalia
- Stem group: Onychophora
- Genus: †Onychomicrodictyon; Demidenko, 2006
- Species: †O. spiniferum

Binomial name
- †Onychomicrodictyon spiniferum Demidenko, 2006

Extinct genus of shelled animals

Onychomicrodictyon is a genus of Toyonian net-like small shelly fossil that probably belonged to a lobopodian resembling Onychodictyon or Microdictyon; the plates have a honeycomb structure with nodal flanges and an apical spinose extension. It is considered a junior synonym of Onychodictyon by some authors.
