= Nils Peter Angelin =

Swedish palaeontologist (1805–1876)

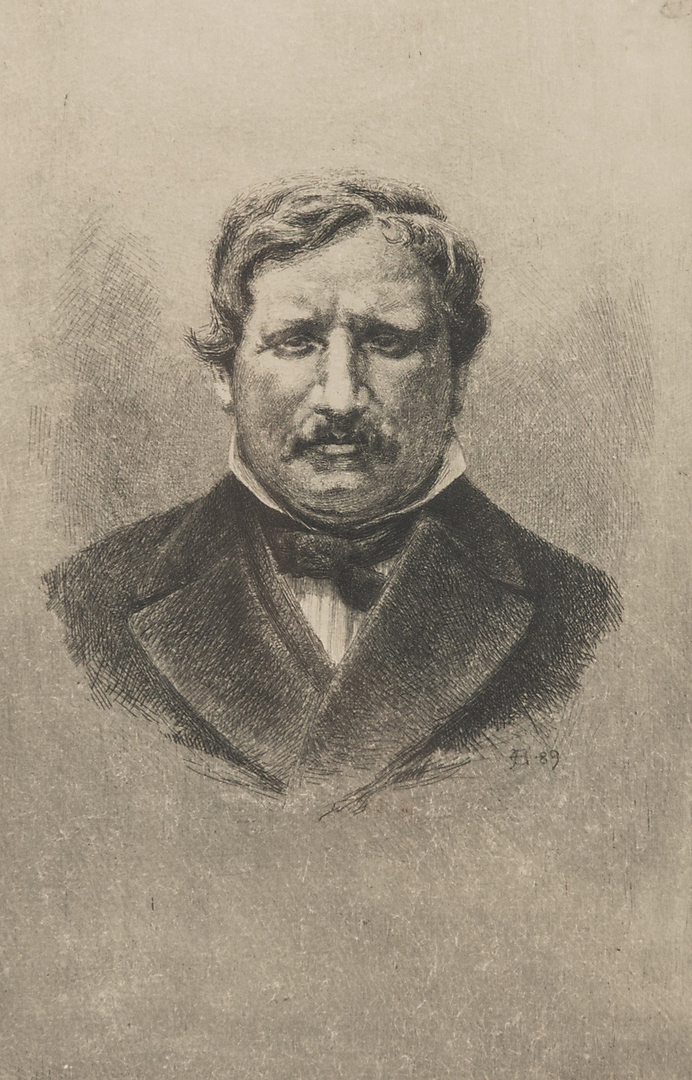

Nils Peter Angelin (23 June 1805 – 13 February 1876) was a Swedish paleontologist and professor at the University of Lund from 1865. He was also curator of the paleontology at the National Museum in Stockholm.

== Life and work ==
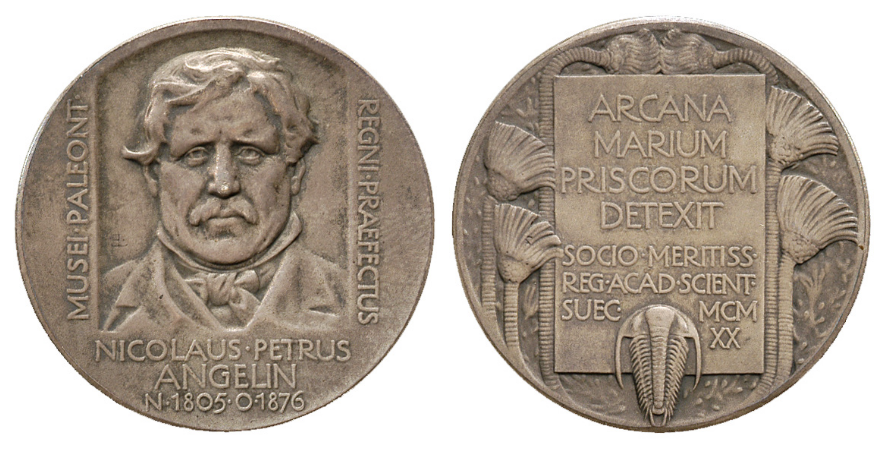
1920 commemorative medal of the Swedish Academy of Sciences

Angelin was born in Lund, the son of a blacksmith Tuve and Brita Kristina Risberg. He studied at Lund Cathedral School and went to the University of Lund but did not obtain any degree in the thirty six years he spent there. He attended lectures in law by Johan Holmbergsson, theology by Henrik Reuterdahl, botany from Elias Fries and natural history under Sven Nilsson although he did not get along well with Nilsson. Angelin collected fossils from Norway and Sweden and described numerous species from 1839. On his travels he was able to meet Joachim Barrande and Ferdinand Roemer. On the latter's recommendation he received an honorary doctorate from Breslau in 1857. He became a docent at the University of Lund and later became an adjunct. Angelin earned money through sales of fossils and second-hand books. Jacob Berzelius once expressed his displeasure about the loss of valuable Swedish fossils to foreign countries. Angelin hired the illustrator and lithographer Magnus Körner to produce an illustrated work on the paleontology of Sweden. He initially called it Palæontologia Svecica (1851) but later changed the title to Palæontologia Scandinavica (1854). In 1861 he was elected to the Royal Geographic Society of Sweden. His collections were obtained by the National Museum in 1864 for an annual payment of 2000 Swedish kronors. He produced a geological map of Scania in 1865. Angelin was among the first to note sexual dimorphism in ostracods of the Beyrichia group. He was made a professor at the Royal Academy of Sciences in the same year. After his death, a work on crinoids, Iconographia crinoideorum (1878) and Fragmenta silurica (1880) was published by his successor Gustaf Lindström.

In 1920 the Swedish Academy of Sciences produced a commemorative medal of Angelin with a trilobite and a Latin motto "Arcana Marium Priscorum Detexit" [= "he discovered the secrets of the ancient seas"].
