= Steptoean positive carbon isotope excursion =

The Steptoean positive carbon isotope excursion (SPICE) is a global chemostratigraphic event which occurred during the upper Cambrian period between 497 and 494 million years ago. This event corresponds with the ICS Guzhangian-Paibian Stage boundary and the Marjuman-Steptoean stage boundary in North America. The general signature of the SPICE event is a positive δ^{13}C excursion, characterized by a 4 to 6 ‰ (per mille) shift in δ^{13}C values within carbonate successions around the world. SPICE was first described in 1993, and then named later in 1998. In both these studies, the SPICE excursion was identified and trends were observed within Cambrian formations of the Great Basin of the western United States.

== Age ==
The age of the SPICE is dated to between 497 and 494 MA, where it has primarily been identified through the use of relative dating and biostratigraphy. The onset of SPICE is generally accepted to correspond with the second wave of the End-Marjuman Biomere Extinction, and its termination corresponds to the End-Steptoean Biomere Extinction. Using trilobite and brachiopod index fossils linked to these extinctions, the upper and lower boundaries of the event can be defined. The beginning of the SPICE is identified by the extinction of shallow water polymerid trilobites, later replaced by deep water olenimorph trilobites following the observed peak δ^{13}C value of the SPICE event. The age of SPICE can also be determined based on its correlation with the well-known Sauk II- Sauk III Sequence boundary in North America. Furthermore, in addition to biostratigraphic markers the 3 million year time frame of the SPICE event has also been determined using calculated deposition rates and the length of some of the more extensively studied SPICE sequences.

== Localities, geology and δ^{13}C characteristics ==
=== Localities ===
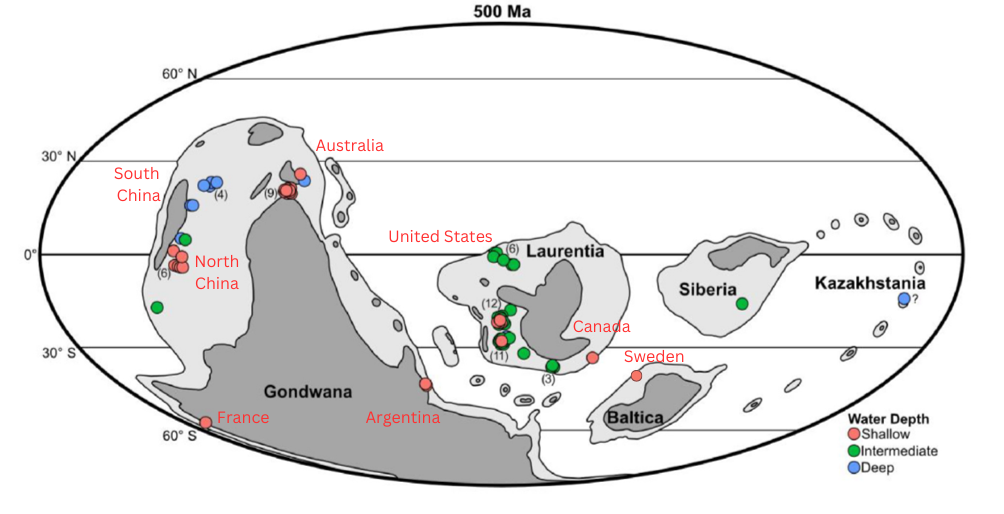
A map of SPICE localities during the upper Cambrian (500 Ma). Points on the map denote the locations of formations and the color indicates the paleo-water depth. Modified image is originally sourced from Pulsipher et al., 2021.

The SPICE event is expressed globally with known formations in 11 countries: United States, China, Australia, South Korea, Argentina, Canada, France, Kazakhstan, Scotland and Sweden (ordered by greatest to least number of localities). These locations span 4 modern continents (North America, Asia, Australia, Europe and South America), and represent 5 upper Cambrian paleocontinents: Laurentia, Gondwana, Kazakhstania, Siberia, and Baultica. All formations containing SPICE intervals formed between the paleolatitudes of 30°N and 60°S. For a full list of SPICE localities and formation see the following maps and table.

Modern localities of formations containing the SPICE excursion. See accompanying table for more detail.

Localities where the SPICE has been observed (average shifts in δ^{13}C values are derived from the Pulsipher et al. SPICEraq dataset)
Modern country	Paleocontinent	Average shift in δ^{13}C values (‰)	Formation
United States (14 localities)	Laurentia	+3.18 ‰	Nevada: McGill Range; Shingle Pass; Utah: House Range; Lawson Cove Range; Upper Nouman and lower St. Charles formations; Southern Appalachians: Copper Ridge Dolomites, Knox Group; Maynardville Formation, Conasauga Group; Nolichucky Formation, Conasauga Group; Other Areas: Eau Claire Formation, Kentucky; Franconia Formation, Illinois; Rhinehart A-1 corehole (Hollandale "Embayment"), central Iowa; Schodack Formation, New York; Upper Bonneterre & Davis Formation, Southern Missouri; Wind River Range, Wyoming
China (8 localities)	Gondwana	+3.15 ‰	North China: Changshan Formation, Tangwangzhai section, Gushan, Shandong Province; Chaomidian Formation, Shandong Province; Gushan Formation; Huangyangshan (HYS) section, Shandong Province; South China: Huaqiao Formation, Wangcun & Paibi section, Hunan Province; Huayansi Formation, Duibian A and B sections, western Zhejiang; Upper Chefu & lower Bitiao Formation, Wa'ergang section, Northern Hunan Province; Other Areas: Yaerdang Mountain profile, North-West China
Australia (4 localities)	Gondwana	+4.16 ‰	Queensland: Mount Murray; Mount Whelan; Northern Australia: Arrinthrunga Formation, southern Georgina Basin; Central Australia: Upper Shannon Formation, NE Amadeus Basin; Goyder Formation, Amadeus Basin
South Korea (2 localities)	Gondwana	+2.89 ‰	Machari Formation, Gangweon Province; Sesong Formation
Argentina (2 localities)	Gondwana	+4.15 ‰	La Flecha Formation; Zonda Formation
Canada (2 localities)	Laurentia	+3.02 ‰	March Point formation, Port au Port group, Newfoundland; Petit Jadin formation, Port au Port group, Newfoundland
France (2 localities)	Gondwana	+5.11 ‰	Val d'Homs formation, Montagne Noire; La Gardie formation, Montagne Noire
Kazakhstan (1 locality)	Kazakhstania	+5.34 ‰	Furongian Kyrshabakty section, southern Kazakhstan
Scotland (1 locality)	Laurentia	+3.42 ‰	Eilean Dubh Formation, Northern Scotland
Russia (1 locality)	Siberia	+4.32 ‰	Kulyumbe Formation, Siberian Platform, Siberia
Sweden (1 locality)	Baltica	+1.5 ‰	Alum Shale Formation

=== Geology ===
Formations containing SPICE excursions are highly variable with geologic characteristics varying greatly amongst localities. Stratigraphic thickness in particular has very large ranges between locations, with the smallest being the Wangliangyu section of China which is less than 3m. This thickness is in contrast to the Kulyumbe section of Siberia which is greater than 800m. This variability of stratigraphic thickness suggests that the regional deposition rates during the 497 Ma to 494 Ma SPICE period were not globally uniform and more regionally dependent.

Furthermore, formations containing the SPICE excursion represent a wide variety of lithologies, facies and water depths. In terms of lithology, all SPICE intervals are contained within carbonate units within carbonate and silicate sequences. The most common lithology for SPICE intervals are micritic limestones, or carbonate shales, generally interbedded with thin layers of calcareous mudstone. SPICE intervals have also been observed in dolostone units; however, these are not as common as the carbonate rocks. SPICE intervals are also highly variable when it comes to facies, with examples for shallow, intermediate and deep water settings (see map in the localities section). Considering the two most prominent areas of study, Laurentian formations (USA) tend to have stronger representation from shallow and intermediate facies (shallow/ near shore, shelf, intrashelf basin), while Gondwanan sections (China & Australia) have better representation of deep water facies (slope and basin), along with shallow and intermediate facies.

=== Stages of SPICE ===
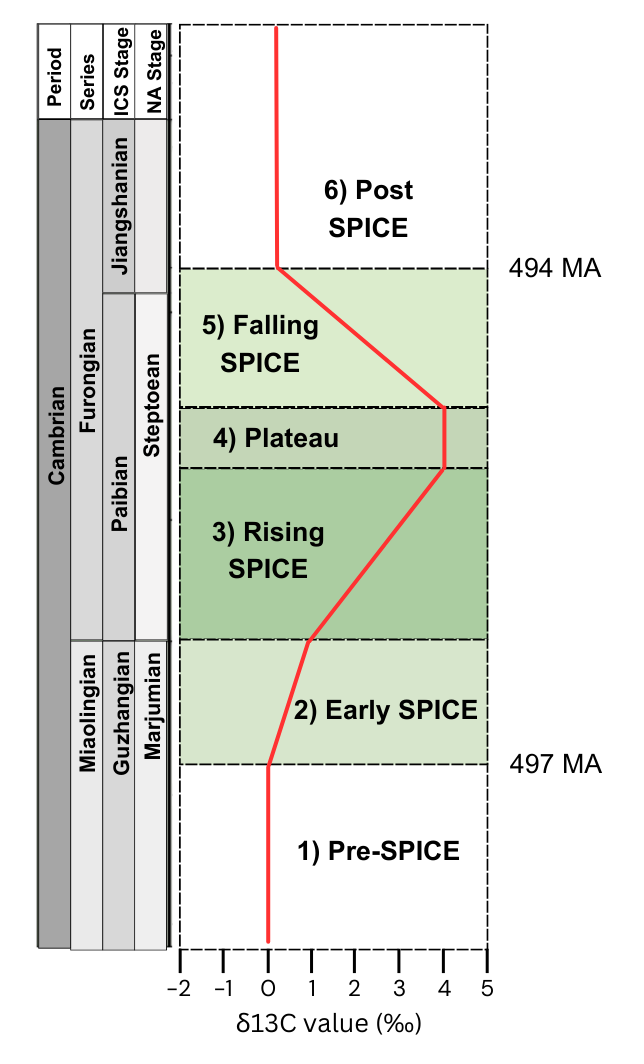
The six stages of the SPICE. The red line indicates the δ13C value. Plot modified from Pulsipher et al., 2021 and Zhang et al., 2023.

Defining standard δ^{13}C values of the SPICE interval, it can be noted the magnitude is highly variable from location to location, with maximum excursion values ranging from 0.64 ‰ to 8.03 ‰. Regardless of values though, the SPICE interval can be identified based on a similar pattern observed in each sequence. This pattern is identified based on 6 distinct stages: pre-SPICE, early SPICE, rising SPICE, plateau, falling SPICE, and post SPICE (see figure for visual representation of each stage).

==== Stage 1: Pre-SPICE ====
All areas of the section prior to the onset of the SPICE interval. δ^{13}C values remain near 0 ‰, similar to modern marine dissolved inorganic carbon.

==== Stage 2: Early SPICE ====
Onset of SPICE, characterized by a slow increase in δ^{13}C from 0 to approximately 1 ‰, suggesting a gradual increase in organic carbon burial and decrease in oceanic ^{12}C.

==== Stage 3: Rising SPICE ====
Rapid increase in δ^{13}C from the early SPICE value to the max value. This shift in value is generally between 3 ‰ and 6 ‰, suggesting a rapid increase in organic carbon burial. The onset of the rising SPICE also generally corresponds to fossil indicators for the 2nd stage of the end-Marjuman biomere extinction.

==== Stage 4: Plateau ====
δ^{13}C values fluctuate but remain near the maximum value for a period of time. This stage is not observed in all SPICE intervals. After reaching the maximum value, most intervals proceed immediately into stage 5, the falling SPICE.

==== Stage 5: Falling SPICE ====
Rapid decrease from the maximum δ^{13}C value to near the standard ocean water value (0 ‰). The rate of decrease in the falling SPICE is generally more rapid than the rate of increase in the Rising SPICE. Generally interpreted as ocean water returning to standard δ^{13}C levels.

==== Stage 6: Post SPICE ====
All areas of the section immediately following the termination of SPICE.

=== Factors affecting the magnitude of the δ^{13}C anomaly ===
Despite being a global event, the magnitude of δ^{13}C values observed within a SPICE interval appear to be highly affected by a variety of local conditions. A few common trends that have been determined are as follows:

1. Higher paleolatitude formations (greater than 30°S) tend to have lower δ^{13}C values throughout the sequence.
2. Shallower facies have lower values than deeper facies.
3. Limestone tends to have marginally higher δ^{13}C than dolostone.

== Proposed mechanism ==
Regional sea level changes, cooling of upper sea water from the deep ocean, ocean anoxia/euoxia, and trilobite and brachiopod extinctions are all associated with the SPICE event. This combination of factors creates the conditions for the primary mechanism of formation for the SPICE, an increase in the burial of organic carbon, caused by increased primary productivity (e.g. photosynthesis).

The spread of deep ocean anoxia or euxinia, indicated by a positive correlated δ^{34}S_{CAS} excursion and increased pyrite burial, created conditions encouraging the preservation of deposited organic material and stressful conditions for the marine organisms. Initially, these conditions would have spread slowly, limited to deep environments and having small impacts on the global carbon system. This slow initial change is represented by the gradual and small δ^{13}C changes of the early SPICE. As time passed through, causes of anoxic/euxinia conditions increased and moving up the shelf into shallower facies. This combined with other factors such as ocean level regression (such as the Sauk II-Sauk III in North America), and global cooling of the atmosphere and oceans, increased pressure was imposed on ocean ecosystems. This increase in pressure likely triggered the second wave of the End-Marjuman Biomere Extinction, resulting in the disappearance of many shallow-water trilobite and brachiopod species from the fossil record at this time.

With the extinction of these trilobites and brachiopods, photosynthetic primary producers likely flourished as a result of decreased predation. This combined with an increase in burial from expanding anoxic conditions and less bioturbation from now extinct ocean floor dwelling organisms would likely cause δ^{13}C values to sharply rise. This sharp rise is captured in the SPICE through the rising SPICE stage, in which δ^{13}C values reflect this rapid change in primary productivity and burial following the extinction. Finally, moving out of the End-Marjuman Biomere Extinction and into the falling SPICE, oceans likely experience significant recovery in biodiversity. Following the extinction of shallow water taxa, the better adapted deep water olenimorph trilobite fauna begin to diversify. Filling the shallow water environments left vacant by the End-Marjuman Biomere extinction. This return of secondary producers, along with reductions in anoxic conditions caused by changes in climate and stabilizing ocean levels causing reductions in primary productivity and organic carbon burial. Rapidly reducing δ^{13}C values, and stabilizing to more standard ocean δ^{13}C values observed in the post SPICE stage.

== Controversies ==
One question still being researched in relation to the SPICE is the potential of an undescribed negative δ^{13}C excursion directly before the early SPICE stage. This undetermined negative excursion does not appear at all localities. It is theorized this excursion may have remained undetected as a result of sampling discrepancies or because it only represents a local event. Another key controversy of the SPICE is its exact timing in relation to the end-Marjuman biomere extinction, and the end-Steptoean biomere extinction. Currently research can only link the onset of the SPICE to the second wave of the end-Marjuman extinction. More research is required to determine if and how the first wave of the extinction relates to SPICE. Furthermore, there is still a great deal of questions about SPICE and its implication for large biodiversity events occurring in the post SPICE such as the end-Steptoean biomere extinction and Great Ordovician Biodiversification Event (GOBE). Some research suggests that the turnover in trilobite and brachiopod species that occurred during the SPICE may have a direct correlation with these subsequent events.

=== Comparison to other anomalies ===
==== Hirnantian Isotopic Carbon Excursion (HICE) ====
Similar to the SPICE, the HICE event is linked to changes in the climate and falls in global sea level, resulting in anoxic conditions and an increase in organic carbon burial. δ^{13}C values for the HICE have a similar positive magnitude, ranging from ~+2‰ to ~+7‰. Furthermore, similar to SPICE, the HICE event likely occurred over a small time period. Occurring in the upper Ordovician and lasting less than 1.3 Ma. One difference between the HICE and SPICE though, is the HICE is generally restricted to shallow water carbonate facies.

==== Silurian Ireviken event ====
This early Silurian (431 Ma) δ^{13}C excursion also shows similarities to the SPICE event, with positive max δ^{13}C values around 4.5‰. Similar to the SPICE, research suggests this event is linked to falling ocean levels and a faunal turnover. Similar to SPICE, the Ireviken event also has a positive δ^{34}S_{CAS} excursion correlated with the δ^{13}C excursion. Suggesting the influence of anoxic conditions and increased organic carbon burial. Furthermore, the Ireviken event also has global occurrences, but their expression is highly influenced by local facies characteristics, similar to SPICE.
