= Luoyixi =

Town in Hunan, China

Luoyixi Town (Chinese: 罗依溪镇; pinyin: Luōyīxī zhèn) is a town in Guzhang County of China's Hunan Province. It is located on a bay of the Fengtan Reservoir (formerly, a southern tributary of the You River). As of the census of 2010, it has a total population of 10,000.

Hongshilin (红石林, "Red Stone Forest") National Geopark is located on the reservoir's bank northeast of town (28°41′45″N 109°59′39″E).

The Luoyixi Global boundary Stratotype Section and Point is named after the town. The actual point is on the shore of the Fengtan Reservoir, some 4 km northwest (upstream) from Luoyixi Town, halfway to the neighboring Wangcun Town.

== See also ==
- List of township-level divisions of Hunan
