= Richard A. Robison =

American paleontologist (1933–2026)

- Born: Richard Ashby Robison; January 10, 1933; Fillmore, Utah, U.S.
- Died: April 24, 2026 (aged 93); Overland Park, Kansas, U.S.
- Education: Brigham Young University; University of Texas at Austin
- Occupation: Paleontologist
- Spouse(s): Joleen Ashman (m. 1953; died. 1994) Mary Meitl Pfortmiller (m. 1996)

Richard Ashby Robison (January 10, 1933 – April 24, 2026) was an American paleontologist.

== Life and career ==
Robison was born in Fillmore, Utah, the son of Aaron Wayne Robison and Fern Ashby. He attended Brigham Young University, earning his BS degree in 1957 and his MS degree in 1958. He also attended the University of Texas at Austin, earning his PhD degree in geology in 1962.

Robison served as a professor in the department of geology at the University of Kansas from 1974 to 1998. During his years as a professor, in 1974, he was named the Gulf-Hedberg Distinguished Professor of Geology.

== Personal life and death ==
Robison was married twice. In 1953, he married Joleen Ashman. Their marriage lasted until her death in 1994. After the death of his first wife, he then married Mary Meitl Pfortmiller in 1996. His second marriage lasted until his death in 2026.

Robison died in Overland Park, Kansas on April 24, 2026, at the age of 93.
