= Chemostratigraphy =

Concept and techniques in geology

Chemostratigraphy, or chemical stratigraphy, is the study of the chemical variations within sedimentary sequences to determine stratigraphic relationships. The field is relatively young, having only come into common usage in the early 1980s, but the basic idea of chemostratigraphy is nearly as old as stratigraphy itself: distinct chemical signatures can be as useful as distinct fossil assemblages or distinct lithographies in establishing stratigraphic relationships between different rock layers.

== Types of chemical variations ==
In some stratigraphic sequences, there is clearly a variation in color between different strata. Such color differences often originate from variations in the incorporation of transition metal-containing materials during deposition and lithification. Other differences in color can originate from variations in the organic carbon content of the rock. However, until relatively recently, these variations were not commonly investigated because of the great effort and expense involved in chemical analysis.

Recently, the development of new analytical techniques for chemical analysis for igneous petrological applications during the latter half of the 20th century, e.g., the electron microprobe, and the development of normal focus X-ray fluorescence for wellsite oil exploration has improved the availability of bulk chemical analysis techniques to the sedimentary geologist, making analysis of the chemical composition of strata increasingly possible. Concurrently, advances in atomic physics stimulated investigations in stable isotope geochemistry. Most relevant to chemostratigraphy in general was the discovery by Harold Urey and Cesare Emiliani in the early 1950s that the oxygen isotope variability in the calcite shells of foraminifera could be used as a proxy for past ocean temperatures.

Thus, chemostratigraphy generally provides two useful types of information to the larger geological community. First, chemostratigraphy can be used to investigate environmental change on the local, regional, and global levels by relating variations in rock chemistry to changes in the environment in which the sediment was deposited. An extreme example of this type of investigation might be the discovery of strata rich in iridium near the boundary between the Cretaceous and Tertiary systems globally. The high concentration of iridium, which is generally rare in the Earth's crust, is indicative of a large delivery of extraterrestrial material, presumably from a large asteroid impactor during this time. A more prosaic example of chemostratigraphic reconstruction of past conditions might be the use of the carbon-13/carbon-12 ratio over geologic time as a proxy for changes in carbon cycle processes at different stages of biological evolution. Second, regionally or globally correlatable chemostratigraphic signals can be found in rocks whose formation time is well-constrained by radionuclide dating of the strata themselves or by strata easily correlated with them, such as a volcanic suite that interrupts nearby strata. However, many sedimentary rocks are much harder to date, because they lack minerals with high concentrations of radionuclides and cannot be correlated with nearly datable sequences. Yet many of these rocks do possess chemostratigraphic signals. Therefore, the correlation between chemostatigraphic signals in conventionally datable and non-datable sequences has extended greatly our understanding of the history of tectonically quiescent regions and of biological organisms that lived in such regions. Chemostratigraphy also has acted as a check on other sub-fields of stratigraphy such as biostratigraphy and magnetostratigraphy.
