= Small shelly fauna =

Fossils from the Ediacaran and Cambrian periods

The small shelly fauna, small shelly fossils (SSF), or early skeletal fossils (ESF) are mineralized fossils, many only a few millimetres long, with a nearly continuous record from the latest stages of the Ediacaran to the end of the Early Cambrian period. They are very diverse, and there is no formal definition of "small shelly fauna" or "small shelly fossils". Almost all are from earlier rocks than more familiar fossils such as trilobites. Since most SSFs were preserved by being covered quickly with phosphate and this method of preservation is mainly limited to the late Ediacaran and early Cambrian periods, the animals that made them may actually have arisen earlier and persisted after this time span.

Some of the fossils represent the entire skeletons of small organisms, including the mysterious Cloudina and some snail-like molluscs. However, the bulk of the fossils are fragments or disarticulated remains of larger organisms, including sponges, molluscs, slug-like halkieriids, brachiopods, echinoderms, and onychophoran-like organisms that may have been close to the ancestors of arthropods.

One of the early explanations for the appearance of the SSFs – and therefore the evolution of mineralized skeletons – suggested a sudden increase in the ocean's concentration of calcium. However, many SSFs are constructed of other minerals, such as silica. Because the first SSFs appear around the same time as organisms first started burrowing to avoid predation, it is more likely that they represent early steps in an evolutionary arms race between predators and increasingly well-defended prey. On the other hand, mineralized skeletons may have evolved simply because they are stronger and take less energy to produce than all-organic skeletons like those of insects. Nevertheless, it is still true that the animals used minerals that were most easily accessible.

Although the small size and often fragmentary nature of SSFs makes it difficult to identify and classify them, they provide very important evidence for how the main groups of marine invertebrates evolved, and particularly for the pace and pattern of evolution in the Cambrian explosion. Besides including the earliest known representatives of some modern phyla, they have the great advantage of presenting a nearly continuous record of early Cambrian organisms whose bodies include hard parts.

== History of discovery ==
"Small shellies" in context
← / Small shelly fauna; ← / Ediacaran biota; ← / Maotianshan shales; ← / Tommotian age; ← / Cambrian explosion, if sudden; ← / Ediacaran shelly fauna
Neoproterozoic (last era of the Precambrian); Palæozoic (first era of the Phanerozoic)
Axis scale: millions of years ago.

The term "small shelly fossils" was coined by Samuel Matthews and V. V. Missarzhevsky in 1975. The term is often abbreviated to "small shellies" or "SSF". It is quite a misnomer since, as Stefan Bengtson says, "they are not always small, they are commonly not shelly". Paleontologists have been unable to invent a better term, and have vented their frustration in parodies such as "small silly fossils" and "small smellies".

The great majority of all the morphological features of later shelled organisms appear among the SSFs. No-one has attempted a formal definition of "small shelly fauna", "small shelly fossils" or other similar phrases.

Specimens and sometimes quite rich collections of these fossils were discovered between 1872 and 1967, but no-one drew the conclusion that the Early Cambrian contained a diverse range of animals in addition to the traditionally recognized trilobites, archaeocyathans, etc. In the late 1960s Soviet paleontologists discovered even richer collections of SSFs in beds below and therefore earlier than those containing Cambrian trilobites. Unfortunately the papers that described these discoveries were in Russian, and the 1975 paper by Matthews and Missarzhevsky first brought the SSFs to the serious attention of the non-Russian-reading world.

There was already a vigorous debate about the early evolution of animals. Preston Cloud argued in 1948 and 1968 that the process was "explosive", and in the early 1970s Niles Eldredge and Stephen Jay Gould developed their theory of punctuated equilibrium, which views evolution as long intervals of near-stasis "punctuated" by short periods of rapid change. On the other hand, around the same time Wyatt Durham and Martin Glaessner both argued that the animal kingdom had a long Proterozoic history that was hidden by the lack of fossils.

== Occurrence ==
Rich collections have been found in China, Russia, Mongolia, Kazakhstan, Australia, and Antarctica; and moderately diverse ones in India, Pakistan, Iran, Europe and North America. There are different views about the time range of the SSFs. The Russian discoveries of the late 1960s were assigned to the Tommotian age of the Cambrian period, and for some time the term "small shelly fauna" was applied only to that age. On the other hand, Bengston includes in "SSF" Ediacaran fossils like Cloudina and post-Tommotian fossils like Microdictyon from the lagerstätte of the Maotianshan Shales. SSFs have been found in layers that also contain fossil trilobites. The mass extinction at the end of the Cambrian period's Botomian age was thought to have wiped out most of the SSF, with the exception of the halkieriids, wiwaxiids and Pojetaia.

== Mode of preservation ==
Small shelly fossils are typically, although not always, preserved in phosphate. Whilst some shellies were originally phosphatic, in most cases the phosphate represents a replacement of the original calcite. They are usually extracted from limestone by placing the limestone in a weak acid, typically acetic acid; the phosphatized fossils remain after the rock is dissolved away. Preservation of microfossils by phosphate seems to have become less common after the early Cambrian, perhaps as a result of increased disturbance of sea-floors by burrowing animals. Without this fossil-forming mode, many small shelly fossils may not have been preserved – or been impossible to extract from the rock; hence the animals that produced these fossils may have lived beyond the early Cambrian – the apparent extinction of most SSFs by the end of the Cambrian may be an illusion. For decades it was thought that halkieriids, whose "armor plates" are a common type of SSF, perished in the end-Botomian mass extinction; but in 2004 halkieriid armor plates were reported from Mid Cambrian rocks in Australia, a good 10 million years more recent than that.

== Minerals used in shells ==
Small shelly fossils are composed of a variety of minerals, the most important being silica, calcium phosphate and calcium carbonate. The minerals used by each organism are influenced by the chemistry of the oceans the organism first evolved in, but then continue to be used even if the ocean chemistry changes. For example, in the Ediacaran period and the Nemakit–Daldynian age of the Cambrian, those animals that used calcium carbonate used the form called aragonite. On the other hand, animals that first appeared in the following Tommotian age used another form, calcite.

A recently discovered modern gastropod that lives near deep-sea hydrothermal vents illustrates the influence of both earlier and contemporary local chemical environments: its shell is made of aragonite, which is found in the earliest fossil molluscs; but it also has armor plates on the sides of its foot, and these are mineralized with the iron sulfides pyrite and greigite, which had never previously been found in any metazoan but whose ingredients are emitted in large quantities by the vents.

Methods of constructing shells vary widely among the SSF, and in most cases the exact mechanisms are not known.

== Evolution of skeletons and biomineralization ==
		Biomineralized	
		No	Yes
Skeleton	No	Dickinsonia	Halkieria sclerites
Skeleton	Yes	Kimberella	Helcionellids

Biomineralization is the production of mineralized parts by organisms. Hypotheses to explain the evolution of biomineralization include physiological adaptation to changing chemistry of the oceans, defense against predators and the opportunity to grow larger. The functions of biomineralization in SSFs vary: some SSFs are not yet understood; some are components of armor; and some are skeletons. A skeleton is any fairly rigid structure of an animal, irrespective of whether it has joints and irrespective of whether it is biomineralized. Although some SSFs may not be skeletons, SSFs are biomineralized by definition, being shelly. Skeletons provide a wide range of possible advantages, including: protection, support, attachment to a surface, a platform or set of levers for muscles to act on, traction when moving on a surface, food handling, provision of filtration chambers and storage of essential substances.

It has often been suggested that biomineralization evolved as a response to an increase in the concentration of calcium in the seas, which happened around the Ediacaran–Cambrian boundary, and that biomineralization's main benefit was to store harmlessly minerals that might have disrupted organisms' internal processes. For example, Mikhail A. Fedonkin suggested that an increase in the length of food chains may have contributed, as animals higher up the food chain accumulate greater amounts of waste products and toxins relative to their size, and biomineralization may have been a way of isolating excess carbonates or silicates consumed with prey. However, biomineralizing a skeleton is a fairly expensive way to dispose safely of excess minerals, as the main construction cost is the organic matrix, mostly proteins and polysaccharides, with which minerals are combined to form composite materials. The idea that biomineralization was a response to changes in ocean chemistry is also undermined by the fact that small shelly fossils made of calcite, aragonite, calcium phosphate and silica appeared virtually simultaneously in a range of environments.

Organisms started burrowing to avoid predation at around the same time. Jerzy Dzik suggested that biomineralization of skeletons was a defense against predators, marking the start of an evolutionary arms race. He cited as another example of hardened defenses from this time the fact that the earliest protective "skeletons" included glued-together collections of inorganic objects — for example the early Cambrian worm Onuphionella built a tube covered with mica flakes. Such a strategy required both anatomical adaptations that allowed organisms to collect and glue objects and also moderately sophisticated nervous systems to co-ordinate this behavior.

On the other hand, Bernard Cohen argued that biomineralized skeletons arose for "engineering" reasons rather than as defenses. There are many other defensive strategies available to prey animals including mobility and acute senses, chemical defenses, and concealment. Mineral-organic composites are both stronger and take less energy to build than all-organic skeletons, and these two advantages would have made it possible for animals to grow larger and, in some cases, more muscular. In animals beyond a certain size, the larger muscles and their greater leverage produce forces all-organic skeletons are not rigid enough to withstand. The development of modern brachiopods includes a progression from all-organic to mineral-organic composite shells, which may be a clue to their evolutionary development. The evolution of rigid biomineralized exoskeletons may then have started an arms race in which predators developed drills or chemical weapons capable of penetrating shells, some prey animals developed heavier, tougher shells, etc.

Fedonkin suggested another explanation for the appearance of biomineralization around the start of the Cambrian: the Ediacara biota evolved and flourished in cold waters, which slowed their metabolisms and left them with insufficient spare energy for biomineralization; but there are signs of global warming around the start of the Cambrian, which would have made biomineralization easier. A similar pattern is visible in living marine animals, since biomineralized skeletons are rarer and more fragile in polar waters than in the tropics.

== Evolutionary significance ==
In some locations, up to 20% of Cloudina fossils show borings, holes that are thought to have been made by predators. The very similar shelly fossil Sinotubulites, which is often found in the same locations, was not affected by borings. In addition, the distribution of borings in Cloudina suggests selection for size – the largest holes appear in the largest shells. This evidence of selective attacks by predators suggests that new species may have arisen in response to predation, which is often presented as a potential cause of the rapid diversification of animals in the early Cambrian.

Stem groups: — = Lines of descent; = Basal node; = Crown node; = Total group; = Crown group; = Stem group

The small shellies provide a relatively continuous record throughout the early Cambrian, and thus provide a more useful insight into the Cambrian explosion than instances of exceptional preservation. Although most of the SSFs are difficult to identify, those assigned positions in modern taxa, or in their stem groups of evolutionary "aunts" or "cousins", enable scientists to assess the pattern and speed of animal evolution on the strength of the small shelly evidence. Such an assessment shows that the earliest small shellies are the most basal. As time goes on, they can be placed in the stem group to an ever-smaller clade. In other words, the earliest (Ediacaran) small shellies can be tentatively considered diploblastic, in other words made of two main tissue layers. Later shellies are more convincingly triploblastic, as all "higher" animals are. Subsequently, the Helcionellids are the first shelly fossils that can be placed in the stem group to a phylum (mollusca). As one looks at more recent SSFs, the arguments for stem group placements become stronger, and by the Atdabanian, some SSFs can be assigned to the crown group of a modern phylum, echinoderms. This gives the impression that the first SSF animals, from the late Ediacaran, were basal members of later clades, with the phyla subsequently appearing in a "rapid, but nevertheless resolvable and orderly" fashion, rather than as a "sudden jumble", and thus reveals the true pace of the Cambrian explosion.

== Types of small shelly fossil ==
=== Ediacaran forms ===
Cloudina

Computer model of Namacalathus

The few collections of SSF from the Ediacaran period have a limited range of forms Fully and partially mineralized tubes are common and form a really mixed collection: the structures and compositions of their walls vary widely; specimens have been classified as members of a wide range of clades including foraminiferans, cnidarians, polychaete and pogonophoran annelids, sipunculids and others. Cloudina's "tube", which was 8 to 150 millimetres (0.31 to 5.91 in) long, consisted of nested cones that were mineralized with calcium carbonate but left unmineralized gaps between the cones. Sinotubulites built long thin tubes that were more flexible but probably had mineralized ridges.

Namapoikia was probably either a sponge or a coral-like organism, and built dwellings up to 1 metre (39 in) across out of calcium carbonate.

Spicules are spines or star-like combinations of spines, made of silica, and are thought to be the remains of sponges.

Namacalathus, which may have been a cnidarian, closely related to jellyfish and corals, built goblet-like dwellings with stalks up to 30 millimetres (1.2 in) long. This type of shape is known as a "stalked test", since "test" in biology means a roughly spherical shell.

=== Cambrian forms ===
In finds from the early Cambrian, tubes and spicules become more abundant and diverse, and new types of SSF appear. Many have been attributed to well-known groups such as molluscs, slug-like halkieriids, brachiopods, echinoderms, and onychophoran-like organisms that may have been close to the ancestors of arthropods. A multitude of problematic tubular fossils, such as anabaritids, Hyolithellus or Torellella characterize the earliest Cambrian Small Shelly Fossil skeletal assemblages.

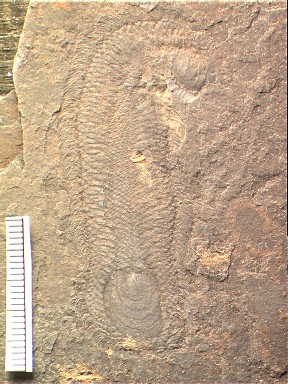
Fossil of Halkieria, showing numerous sclerites on the sides and back, and the cap-like shells at both ends.

Most of the Cambrian SSF consists of sclerites, fragments that once made up the external armor of early animals, such as Halkieria or "scale worms". Fairly complete and assembled sets, which are rare, are called "scleritomes". In many cases the body shapes of sclerites' creators and the distribution of sclerites on their bodies are not known. The "coat of mail" generally disintegrated once the animal died, and its fragments became dispersed and sometimes fossilized. Reconstructing these elements usually relies upon a fully articulated fossil being found in an exceptionally preserved lagerstätte. Such discoveries may in turn enable paleontologists to make sense of other similar fragments, such as those labelled Maikhanella.

Many sclerites are of the type called "coelosclerites", which have a mineralized shell around a space originally filled with organic tissue and which show no evidence of accretionary growth. It is not clear whether coelosclerites evolved independently in different groups of animals or were inherited from a common ancestor. Halkieriids produced scale- or spine-shaped coelosclerites, and complete specimens show that the animals were slug-shaped, and had cap-shaped shell plates at both ends in addition to the sclerites. Chancelloriids produced star-shaped composite coelosclerites. They are known to have been animals that looked like cacti and have been described as internally like sponges, although they may have been more closely related to halkieriids.

The tiny helcionellid fossil Yochelcionella is thought to be an early mollusc. This restoration shows water flowing in under the shell, over the gills and out through the "exhaust pipe".

Some sclerites are mineralized with calcium phosphate rather than calcium carbonate. Tommotiids have a wide range of sclerite shapes and internal structures, and may in fact represent a polyphyletic set of lineages, in other words they may have independently developed phosphatic scleritomes rather than inheriting them from a common ancestor. On the other hand, they may be closely related to the ancestors of modern brachiopods, animals that at first sight look like bivalve molluscs, but brachiopods stand on fleshy stalks and their internal anatomy is different. Some sclerites and small pieces of "debris" are regarded as the remains of echinoderms. Other phosphatic sclerites include tooth-shaped, hook-shaped and plate-like objects, mostly of unknown origin. However it is known that some, including Microdictyon, were produced by lobopods, animals that looked like worms with legs and are thought to be close to the ancestors of arthropods.

Univalved and bivalved shells are fairly common. Some cap-shaped shells are thought to be the only sclerite covering their creators, while others are known to be parts of a more complex armor system like Halkieria's. The helcionellids are thought to be early molluscs with somewhat snail-like shells. Some have horizontal "exhaust pipes" on the concave edges of their shells, and there is debate about whether these pointed forwards or backwards. Hyoliths left small conical shells. These animals may have been molluscs or worm-like Sipuncula. Other molluscan univalved shells have been found in Canada. Some bivalve shells have been found with both parts still joined, and include both brachiopods and bivalve molluscs. Fossils have been found that resemble the opercula ("lids") used by snails to close the openings in their armor, and are attributed to hyoliths, small animals that had conical shells and may have been molluscs or worm-like Sipuncula.

Small arthropods with bivalve-like shells have been found in early Cambrian beds in China, and other fossils (Mongolitubulus henrikseni) represent spines that snapped off bivalved arthropod carapaces.

=== Post-Cambrian forms ===
SSFs after the Cambrian start to pick up more recognizable and modern groups. By the mid-Ordovician, the majority of SSFs simply represent larval molluscs, mostly gastropods.

== See also ==
- Carinachitidae
- Minibeast
- Onychomicrodictyon
