= Baykonurian glaciation =

Ice age around the beginning of the Cambrian Period

Proterozoic snowball periods
Neoproterozoic era; Snowball Earth
Estimate of Proterozoic glacial periods. (Note: Dating of pre-Gaskiers glaciations is uncertain. As for the Kaigas, its very existence is doubted by some. The Huronian glaciation is not shown; there is a lack of any significant evidence for a Snowball Earth during the time period.); Vertical axis: millions of years ago

The Baykonurian glaciation was a glacial period that lasted from around 547 to 540 million years ago at the end of Ediacaran period, forming the boundary between the Proterozoic and the Phanerozoic eons. It is named after the Baykonur Formation in Central Asia.

The deposits of the Baykonurian glaciation are known in regions of Asia and Africa, and it apparently affected both paleohemispheres. Glacial deposits possibly related to this glaciation have been found to be dated between 549 and 530 Mya. The glaciation is also posited as a contributor to the Cambrian explosion.
