= First appearance datum =

Term to designate the first appearance of a species in the geologic record

First appearance datum (FAD) is a term used by geologists and paleontologists to designate the first appearance of a species in the geologic record. FADs are determined by identifying the geologically oldest fossil discovered, to date, of a particular species. A related term is last appearance datum (LAD), the last appearance of a species in the geologic record.

FADs are frequently used to designate segments in the geologic time scale. A given FAD can be used to define a Global Boundary Stratotype Section and Point (GSSP). For example, the beginning of the Tremadocian Stage of the Ordovician Period is marked by the first appearance of the conodont Iapetognathus fluctivagus in the geologic record. This occurs in bed 23 of the rock formation known as the Green Point section, located in western Newfoundland, as well as in geologically correlated strata in many parts of the world. However, diachronous FADs can be problematic for correlating chronostratigraphic units, particularly over longer distances. Use of other data, such as radiometric data, may be ultimately necessary in order to establish more reliable correlations of chronostratigraphic units.

== See also ==
- Biostratigraphy
