= Emigrant Formation =

Geologic formation in Nevada, United States

- Stratigraphic range: Middle Cambrian–Early Ordovician
- Type: Formation
- Sub-units: See: Members
- Underlies: Palmetto Formation
- Overlies: (Outer Shelf) Mule Spring Limestone; (Middle Shelf) Carrara Formation

Lithology
- Primary: Shale
- Other: Mudstone, Limestone, Chert, Sandstone

Location
- Region: Nevada
- Country: United States

Type section
- Named for: Emigrant Pass

The Emigrant Formation is a Cambrian to Ordovician geologic formation in Nevada. It preserves fossils dating back to the Cambrian period, as well as the Ordovician period.

== Geology ==
The Emigrant Formation is dominated by shales, with limestone common at the base and top of the formation. It is overlain by the Palmetto Formation, whilst it is underlain by the limestone dominated Mule Spring Limestone in the Outer Shelf of Nevada, and the siltstone and shale dominated Carrara Formation in the Middle Shelf of Nevada.

=== Members ===
The formation contains three members, which are as follows, in ascending stratigraphic order (lowest to highest):

- Limestone & Siltstone Member: This member is the thinnest of the three, only getting up to 150 m (490 ft) thick in some areas, and is dominated by lime mudstone. At the base of the member, it is entirely composed of shale, which gives way to calcareous sandstone, and then the common lime mudstones above that. Within these lime mudstones, there are occasional layers of more shale and chert.
- Shale Member: This member can get up to 250 m (820 ft) thick in some areas, and is, as the name suggests, entirely dominated by shale, which may be faulted and repeated in many places.
- Limestone & Chert Member: This member is the thickest of the three, getting up to 300 m (980 ft) thick in some areas, and contains a mixture of ribbon limestone, inter-bedded shales, as well as mega-breccia.

The Emigrant Formation also contains lower Ordovician aged rocks above the Limestone & Chert Member, informally known as the "Platy Limestone Unit". This unit is primarily composed of fine-grained, platy limestone, which are inter-bedded with pale-red siltstone. The very top of the unit is not preserved, and contacts the overlying Palmetto Formation at a fault, and the unit itself is also difficult to age, although a lower Ordovician age is suggested, though more evidence will be needed to pinpoint the exact age of the unit. It has also been noted that this unit may represent a transitional bed between the Emigrant and Palmetto Formations.

== Paleobiota ==
The biota of the Emigrant Formation is mainly composed of trilobites like Olenellus and Bathyuriscus, as well as some small shelly fauna in the form of Pelagiella and Microcornus. It also contains a sparse collection of fossils from a lower Ordovician unit right at the top of the formation, containing the chelicerate Esmeraldacaris, as well as some graptolite fauna.

Color key: Taxon / Reclassified taxon / Taxon falsely reported as present / Dubious taxon or junior synonym / Ichnotaxon / Ootaxon / Morphotaxon	Notes; Uncertain or tentative taxa are in small text; ~~crossed out~~ taxa are discredited.

=== Cambrian ===
This section details all the fossils from the Cambrian sections of the Emigrant formation.

==== Arthropoda ====
Arthropoda
Genus	Species	Notes	Images
Amecephalus	Amecephalus (?) sp.; A. arrojosensis	Ptychoparid trilobite.	
Mexicella	M. robusta	Ptychoparid trilobite.	
Paraantagmus	P. latus	Ptychoparid trilobite.	
Onchocephalites	Onchocephalites sp.; O. claytonensis; O. runcinatus	Ptychoparid trilobite.	
Tonopahella	T. goldfieldensis	Ptychoparid trilobite.	
Syspacephalus	S. variosus; S. laticeps; S. mccollumorum	Ptychoparid trilobite.	
Achlysopsis	A. brighamensis; A. liokata	Ptychoparid trilobite.	
Eokochaspis	E. nodosa; E. delamarensis (?); E. piochensis (?); E. longspina (?)	Ptychoparid trilobite.	
Chancia	C. maladensis	Ptychoparid trilobite.	
Kistocare	Kistocare sp.	Ptychoparid trilobite.	
Elrathia	E. marginalis	Ptychoparid trilobite.	
Alokistocare	A. paranotatum	Ptychoparid trilobite.	
Meteoraspis	Meteoraspis sp.	Ptychoparid trilobite.	
Coosella	Coosella sp.	Ptychoparid trilobite.	
Coosia	Coosia sp.	Ptychoparid trilobite.	
Crepicephalus	Crepicephalus sp.	Ptychoparid trilobite.	
Tricrepicephalusalus	Tricrepicephalus sp.	Ptychoparid trilobite.	
Cedaria	Cedaria sp. 1; Cedaria sp. 2; C. selwyni; C. brevifrons	Ptychoparid trilobite.	
Utia (?)	U. curio (?)	Ptychoparid trilobite.	
Kochaspid (?)	Kochaspid (?) sp.	Ptychoparid trilobite.	
Ptychoparioid	Ptychoparioid sp. A; Ptychoparioid sp. B	Ptychoparid trilobites.	
Oryctocephalus	Oryctocephalus sp. A; O. americanus; O. minor; O. orientalus; O. indicus; O. maior; O. reynoldsi	Corynexochid trilobite.	
Euarthricocephalus	E. nevadensis; E. (?) wheelera	Corynexochid trilobite.	
Ovatoryctocara	O. sinensis; Oryctocephalus (?) sp.	Corynexochid trilobite.	
Glossopleura	G. walcotti	Corynexochid trilobite.	
Zacanthoides	Zacanthoides sp.; Z. longipgus; Z. divergens	Corynexochid trilobite.	
Thoracocare	T. minuta	Corynexochid trilobite.	
Parkaspis	P. drumensis	Corynexochid trilobite.	
Kootenia (?)	Kootenia (?) sp.	Corynexochid trilobite.	
Pseudagnostus	P. josepha; P. brighamensis; P. bonnerensis	Agnostid trilobite.	
Pagetia	P. aspinosa; P. rugosa; P. claytonensis; P. fossula	Agnostid trilobite.	
Agnostoid	Agnostoid sp. 1; Agnostoid sp. 2	Agnostid trilobite.	
Bathyuriscus	Bathyuriscus sp.; B. terranovensis	Biceratopsid trilobite. Previously described as Wenkchemnia walcotti and W. sulcata.	
Bolbolenellus	B. brevispinus	Biceratopsid trilobite.	
Olenellus	Olenellus sp.; O. puertoblancoensis (?)	Olenellid trilobite.	
Wujiajiania	W. sutherlandi	Olenellid trilobite.	
Oryctocara	Oryctocara sp.	Oryctocarid trilobite.	
Oryctocarella	Oryctocarella sp.	Oryctocarid trilobite.	
Labiostria	L. westropi	Aphelaspid trilobite.	
Crassifimbra	C. walcotti	Trilobite, family unknown.	
Quasimodaspis	O. brentsae	Tremaglaspidid artiopod.	

==== Lophotrochozoa ====
Genus	Species	Notes	Images
Microcornus	Microcornus sp.	Lophotrochozoan hyolith.	
Parkula	P. esmeraldina	Lophotrochozoan hyolith.	
Haplophrentis	H. carinatus	Lophotrochozoan hyolith.	
Hyolithellus (?)	Hyolithellus (?) sp.	Lophotrochozoan hyolith. May possibly be an annelid.	
Hyolithides	???	Undetermined lophotrochozoan hyoliths, are either preserved as molds, or are too poorly preserved for identification.	
Anabarella	A. chelata	Helcionellid mollusc.	
Pelagiella	P. subangulata	Pelagiellid mollusc.	
Costipelagiella	C. nevadense	Pelagiellid mollusc.	

==== Chancelloriidae ====
Genus	Species	Notes	Images
Allonia	Allonia sp.	Chancelloriid.	
Chancelloria	Chancelloria sp.	Chancelloriid.	

==== Echinodermata ====
Genus	Species	Notes	Images
Echinoderm Ossicles	???	Calcareous element that makes up the endoskeleton of echinoderms.	

==== Porifera (Sponges) ====
Genus	Species	Notes	Images
Hexactinellid spicules	???	Sponge skeleton, with six rays.	

==== Flora ====
Genus	Species	Notes	Images
Archaeooides	A. granulatus	Microalgae.	
Girvanella	Girvanella sp.	Cyanobacteria structures.	

=== Ordovician ===
This section details all the fossils from the Ordovician unit at the top of the Emigrant Formation.

==== Arthropoda ====
Arthropoda
Genus	Species	Notes	Images
Esmeraldacaris	E. richardsonae	Mollisonid chelicerate.	
Caryocaris	Caryocaris sp.	Caryocarid arthropod.	

==== Lophotrochozoa ====
Genus	Species	Notes	Images
Inarticulate brachiopods	???	Lophotrochozoan brachiopods, poor preservation hinders full identification.	

==== Hemichordata ====
Genus	Species	Notes	Images
Dictyonema	Dictyonema sp.	Dendroid graptolite.	
Clonograptus	Clonograptus sp.	Graptolites.	

==== Porifera (Sponges) ====
Genus	Species	Notes	Images
Hexactinellid spicules	???	Sponge skeleton.	
Tetractinellid spicules	???	Sponge skeleton.	

==== Ichnogenera ====
Genus	Species	Notes	Images
Branching Trace Fossils	???	Branching traces.	

== See also ==
- List of fossiliferous stratigraphic units in Nevada
- Paleontology in Nevada
