= Harkless Formation =

Geologic formation in Nevada and California

- Stratigraphic range: lower Cambrian; ~Cambrian Stage 4
- Type: Formation
- Sub-units: See: Members
- Underlies: Saline Valley Formation; Mule Spring Limestone (Split Mountain)
- Overlies: Poleta Formation
- Thickness: 0–3,600 ft (0–1,097 m)

Lithology
- Primary: Siltstone
- Other: Quartzite, Limestone

Location
- Region: Nevada and California
- Country: United States

Type section
- Named for: Harkless Flat
- Named by: Walcott
- Year defined: 1908

The Harkless Formation is a lower Cambrian aged geologic formation in Nevada and California. Deposited sometime during Stage 4 of the Cambrian, the formation contains a wide range of fossils, from arthropods to archeocyathid sponges.

== Discovery and naming ==
The Harkless Formation would be formally described by Charles Doolittle Walcott in a publication in 1908. It is named from exposures on a divide south of Harkless Flat in the southern half of the Waucoba Mountain 15-min quadrangle in the Inyo Mountains of central eastern California.

== Geology ==
The Harkless Formation is mainly composed of siltstones, with many layers of fine to medium-grained quartzites, with limestone within the lower parts of the formation, although this differs in various parts of the formation, and ranges between 0–3,600 ft (0–1,097 m) in thickness. In the Split Mountain area, the formation underlies the Mule Spring Limestone, whilst in other areas it underlies the Saline Valley Formation.

=== Members ===
The formation contains two members, which are as follows, in ascending stratigraphic order (lowest to highest):

- Weepah Member: Near the Andrews Mountain, at the type area of the formation, the member is dominated by greenish-gray and light-olive-gray siltstone, alongside a few layers of yellowish-gray fine to medium grained quartzite. The quartzite layers are identical to the layers found in the Zabriskie Quartzite. The siltstone ranges from grayish-olive, pale-olive, and dark-greenish-gray, and is composed of silt-size grains within a matrix of muscovite and chlorite, and is thinly laminated. They have also slightly metamorphosed, resulting in phyllite or hornfels. The hornfels are primarily composed of muscovite, chlorite, biotite, and quartz. Trace fossils are relatively common within the type area. Within the Esmeralda County, Nevada, the lower sections of the member is still dominated by siltstone, although this differs greatly from the siltstones higher up in the formation. This is due to the layers being quartzitic, coarser and more resistant to natural erosion. The sizes of the grains within these layers hovers around the boundary between coarse silt and very fine sand.
- Alkali Member: The upper Alkali member is composed of limestone layers, up to 100 ft (30 m) thick, inter-stratified with siltstone, and contain an abundance of archeocyathid sponges. Further still there are light-brown limestone layers, only up to 1 ft (0.30 m) thick, that contain Salterella, and are also inter-stratified with the siltstone layers in the middle of the formation. More limestone can be found at the top of the member, being gray or locally yellowish-brown, and up to 40 ft (12 m) thick. In some areas of the member, there are also tongues from the Zabriskie Quartzite, composed primarily of medium-grained quartzite, and can get up to 300 ft (91 m) thick in some places, and inter-stratify with the siltstones. The colour of the quartzite is commonly yellowish-gray or greenish-gray. It is also laminated to thin-bedded. Trace fossils are also common within these quartzite tongues, also appearing on the underlying siltstone layers.

== Taphonomy ==
The cyanobacteria of the Harkless Foramtion are preserved three-dimensionally through silicification, inferred from the high levels of Silicon and Oxygen, as well as the peaks of quartz found through raman spectroscopy within the fossils that is not present within the surrounding matrix, and the remains of Obruchevella after acetic acid digestion. Silicified fossils of other organisms are also known but only though fragments, such as trilobites, hexactinellid spicules, and portions of archaeocyaths. The exact mechanisms that led to the silicification of cyanobacteria is not fully known, with a couple modes being suggested, such as the organic composition of the sheaths of cyanobacteria may have help the silicification process exclusively, further helped by the abundance of authigenic clay minerals and siliceous sponges present in the formation being likely sources for increased silicon in an otherwise low silicon environment, inferred from the lack of silification in other fossils. The other method put forward was storm sedimentation, where storm conditions gathered and concentrated cyanobacterial filaments, and transported them to more favourable conditions for silicification.

== Dating ==
The Harkless Formation has been dated using the presence of certain trilobites such as Olenellus, molluscs such as Pelagiella, as well as Salterella. The presence of these taxa would see the formation placed within the Cambrian Stage 4 Bonnia–Olenellus Trilobite zone, which sees the formation biostratigraphically correlated to the Saline Valley Formation in eastern California.

== Paleobiota ==
The Harkless Formation contains a number of sponge spicules, hyoliths, brachiopods, and other small shelly fauna. Alongside this, there are a myriad of arthropods, namely trilobites, including a single bradoriid, Mongolitubulus. Cyanobacteria are also known from here, such as Girvanella.

Color key: Taxon / Reclassified taxon / Taxon falsely reported as present / Dubious taxon or junior synonym / Ichnotaxon / Ootaxon / Morphotaxon

Notes
Uncertain or tentative taxa are in small text
~~crossed out~~ taxa are discredited.

=== Arthropoda ===
Genus	Species	Notes	Images
Mesonacis	M. fremonti	Olenellid trilobite, originally described as Fremonita.	
Olenellus	Olenellus sp.; O. clarki; O. glabrum	Olenellid trilobite.	
Wanneria	Wanneria sp.	Olenellid trilobite.	
Ogygopsis	Ogygopsis sp.	Dorypygid trilobite.	
Bonnia	Bonnia sp.; B. brennus; B. columbensis	Dorypygid trilobite.	
Ovatoryctocara	O. yaxiensis	Corynexochid trilobite.	
Oryctocephalops	O. frischenfeldi	Corynexochid trilobite.	
Zacanthopsis	Zacanthopsisi sp.; Z. levis	Corynexochid trilobite.	
Protoryctocephalus (?)	P. (?) articus	Corynexochid trilobite.	
Bristolia	B. bristolensis; B. mohavensis	Biceratopsid trilobite, previously reported as Olenellus gilberti.	
Anebocephalus	A. silverpeakensis	Trilobite, family unknown.	
Coenoides	C. scholteni	Trilobite, family unknown.	
Harklessaspis	H. rasettii; H. parvigranulosus	Trilobite, family unknown.	
Arcuolenellus	A. arcuatus; A. megafrontalis	Trilobite, family unknown.	
Crassifimbra	Crassifimbra sp.; C. walcotti	Trilobite, family unknown.	
Mongolitubulus	M. squamifer	Bradoriid arthropod.	

=== Lophotrochozoa ===
Genus	Species	Notes	Images
Hyolithellus	H. insolitus	Lophotrochozoan hyolith. May possibly be an annelid.	
Kyrshabaktella	K. hicksi	Linguliform brachiopod.	
Eothele (?)	E. spurri (?)	Acrotheloid brachiopod.	
Hadrotreta	H. primaea	Acrotheloid brachiopod.	
Obolella	Obolella sp.	Obelellid brachiopod.	
Mickwitzia	M. occidens	Mickwitziid brachiopod.	
Micromitra	Micromitra sp.	Paterinid brachiopod.	
Anuliconus	Anuliconus sp.	Helcionellid mollusc.	
Davidonia (?)	D. rostrata (?)	Helcionellid mollusc.	
Pelagiella	P. subangulata	Pelagiellid mollusc.	
Harkless bryomorph	???	Probable bryozoan, though this has been contested.	

=== Chancelloriidae ===
Genus	Species	Notes	Images
Allonia	Allonia sp.	Chancelloriid.	
Chancelloria	Chancelloria sp.	Chancelloriid.	

=== Cnidaria ===
Genus	Species	Notes	Images
Sphenothallus	Sphenothallus sp.	Cnidarian conulariid.	

=== Echinodermata ===
Genus	Species	Notes	Images
Echinoderm Ossicles	???	Calcareous element that makes up the endoskeleton of echinoderms.	

=== Porifera (Sponges) ===
Genus	Species	Notes	Images
Arrythmocricus	Arrythmocricus sp.	Archeocyathid sponge.	
Diplocyathellus	Diplocyathellus sp.	Archeocyathid sponge.	
Metaldetes	Metaldetes sp.	Archeocyathid sponge.	
Retilamina	R. debrenneae	Archeocyathid sponge.	
Robertiolynthus	R. handfieldi	Archeocyathid sponge.	
Cjulanciella (?)	C. asimmetrica (?)	Hexactinellid sponges.	
Archeocyathids	???	Archeocyathid sponge fragments, found in the lower layers of the formation.	
Hexactinellid spicules	???	Sponge skeleton, with four rays.	
Heteractinida spicules	???	Sponge skeleton, composed of four rays radiating outwards, and two rays rising up from the plane.	

=== incertae sedis ===
Genus	Species	Notes	Images
Volborthella	Volborthella sp.	Tubular salterellid fossil.	
Salterella	S. conulata	Tubular salterellid fossil.	
Lidaconus	L. palmettoensis	Tubular fossil.	

=== Flora ===
Genus	Species	Notes	Images
Obruchevella	O. delicata	Cyanobacteria.	
Girvanella	G. wetheredii (?)	Oscillatoriales cyanobacteria.	
Renalcis	Renalcis sp.	Cyanophyte cyanobacteria.	
Renalcid-like fossil	???	Cyanophyte cyanobacteria.	

=== Ichnogenera ===
Genus	Species	Notes	Images
Cruziana	Cruziana sp.	Trails.	
Planolites	Planolites sp.	Trails.	
Scolicia	Scolicia sp.	Burrows.	
Monocraterion	Monocraterion sp.	Burrows.	
Rusophycus	Rusophycus sp.; R. didymus	Resting trace of trilobites.	
Skolithos	Skolithos sp.	Burrows.	
Bergaueria	Bergaueria sp.	Resting trace of cnidarians.	
Diplichnites	Diplichnites sp.	Arthropod trackways.	
Archaeonassa	Archaeonassa sp.	Burrows.	
Monomorphichnus	M. multilineatus	Trilobite feeding traces.	
Asteriacites (?)	Asteriacites (?) sp.	Sea star burrows.	

== See also ==
- List of fossiliferous stratigraphic units in Nevada
- Paleontology in Nevada
