= Kaili Formation =

Geologic formation in China

- Stratigraphic range: Cambrian; 513–506 Ma
- Type: Geological formation
- Thickness: ~200 m (660 ft)

Lithology
- Primary: Claystone, mudstone, shale
- Other: Siltstone, marl, limestone

Location
- Coordinates: 24.9°N 102.5°E
- Approximate paleocoordinates: 35.1°N 161.3°E
- Region: Guizhou
- Country: China

Type section
- Named for: Kaili
- Kaili Formation (China) Kaili Formation (Guizhou)

The Kaili Formation (simplified Chinese: 凯里组; traditional Chinese: 凱里組; pinyin: Kǎilǐ zǔ) is a stratigraphic formation which was deposited during the Lower and Middle Cambrian (~513 to 506 million years ago). The formation is approximately 200 metres (660 ft) thick and was named after the city Kaili in the Guizhou province of southwest China.

The depositional environment of the Kaili Formation is not entirely known, and there are two hypotheses for its formation. It may have been a nearshore marine environment with 'normal' levels of oxygenation; or it may have been a deeper water environment further from the shore, on the open continental shelf; in this setting oxygen would not be available below the surface layers of the deposited sediment. The trace fossil assemblages in the formation suggest that it was below the wave base and was reasonably well-oxygenated.

== Fossils ==
The faunal assemblage is highly diverse, comprising some 110 genera among 11 phyla; of these, some 40 genera are also found in the Burgess Shale, and some 30 are also found in the Maotianshan Shale. Trilobites and eocrinoids with hard parts that are easily preserved are the most common fossils, but many animals with only soft tissues are also preserved. For example, the arthropod Skania similar to the Ediacaran Parvancorina of the Neoproterozoic age Ediacara Hills of South Australia has been found at the Kaili site.

The middle part of the Kaili Formation, the Oryctocephalus indicus Zone, contains a Burgess Shale-type Lagerstätte with many well-preserved fossils known collectively as the Kaili Biota. In terms of age, this biota is located between the two most important and famous Cambrian Lagerstätten: the middle Lower Cambrian Maotianshan Shale (containing the Chengjiang Biota), also from China: and the Middle Cambrian Burgess Shale, known from Canada.

Some other notable fossils discovered at Kaili are putative invertebrate eggs and embryos, trace fossils of the genus Gordia (not to be confused with the Gordian worms), as well as Naraoia, chancellorids, Microdictyon, Wiwaxia, and Marrella. Furthermore, the possible moss Parafunaria is also known, marking the earliest likely fossil of land plants. However this fossil has been disputed, as its Cambrian age means more conclusive proof is needed to determine whether it truly is a moss.

The Kaili Formation is subdivided into three trilobite zones:

- Bathynotus holopygous–Ovatoryctocara granulata Zone
- Oryctocephalus indicus Zone
- Olenoides jialaoensis Zone

== Paleobiota ==
=== Animals ===
Color key: Taxon / Reclassified taxon / Taxon falsely reported as present / Dubious taxon or junior synonym / Ichnotaxon / Ootaxon / Morphotaxon	Notes; Uncertain or tentative taxa are in small text; ~~crossed out~~ taxa are discredited.

Animals
Genus	Species	Higher taxon	Notes	Images
Skania?	"S." sundbergi	Acercostraca	Likely does not belong to the genus	Carapace of "S." sundbergi
Olenoides	O. paraptus	Dorypygidae	Preserved with gut contents	Fossil of O. superbus from the Marjum Formation
Alicaris	A. kailiensis	Arthropoda		
Pseudoarctolepis	P. semicircularis	Hymenocarina	Differs from the type species in having smaller semicircular "wings"	P. sharpii reconstruction
Tuzoia	T. bispinosa	Tuzoiidae	Preserves ontogeny	T. retifera life restoration
Forfexicaris	F. reticulata	Megacheira?	Relatively similar to the type species	Reconstruction of the type species F. valida
Leanchoilia	L. sp	Megacheira	Preserves neuroanatomy	
Fuxianhuiida indet?	Unapplicable	Deuteropoda	Known from a poorly preserved specimen with trilobite fragments inside its gut	
Mollisonia	M. sinica	Mollisoniida	Differs from Burgess Shale specimens in the shape of the tail and head shields	Reconstruction of M. plenovenatrix
Ursulinacaris	U. cf. grallae	Hurdiidae	One of the first hurdiids from Miaolingian China	
Ottoia	O. guizhouensis	Archaeopriapulida	May not actually belong to Ottoia?	Ottoia prolifica reconstruction
Haplophrentis	H. carinatus	Hyolithida	One specimen found with several eocrinoids growing on its shell in life	Reconstruction of Haplophrentis
Nisusia	N. guizhouensis, N. granosa	Kutorginida	One of the few rhynchonelliforms known from the Cambrian	N. burgessensis from the Burgess Shale
Kailidiscus	K. chinensis	Edrioasteroidea	Strongly resembles other echinoderm clades in several features	
Globeocrinus	G. globulus	Eocrinoidea	Short-stalked, over three times as abundant as Sinoeocrinus	
Sinoeocrinus	S. lui	Eocrinoidea	Synonymous with a wide range of other proposed eocrinoids, has a complex ontogeny	Fossil of Sinoeocrinus
Turbanicystis	T. inflata	Eocrinoidea	Has a very short but broad stalk, which likely secreted a "glue" to cement it to substrate	
Pararotadiscus	P. guizhouensis	Eldoniidae	Small brachiopods and echinoderms likely grew on some specimens in life	Fossil of P. guizhouensis
Dinomischus	D. isolatus?	Dinomischidae (stem-Ctenophora)	Only known from one specimen	Reconstruction of two D. isolatus in their environment
Angulosuspongia	A. sinensis	Vauxiidae (Demospongiae)	First non-Laurentian vauxiid, bears silliceous spicules	
Allonnia	A. phrixothrix, A. erjiensis	Chancelloriidae	Latter species has especially dense sclerites	Reconstruction of A. erjiensis (left) and A. phrixothrix (right)
Archiasterella	A. anchoriformis	Chancelloriidae	One of the two species in the genus known from complete fossils	
Chancelloria	C. zhaoi, C. eros	Chancelloriidae	One specimen of the latter species has a smaller C. eros growing on top of it	Fossil of C. eros from the Wheeler Shale

=== Other taxa ===
Color key: Taxon / Reclassified taxon / Taxon falsely reported as present / Dubious taxon or junior synonym / Ichnotaxon / Ootaxon / Morphotaxon	Notes; Uncertain or tentative taxa are in small text; ~~crossed out~~ taxa are discredited.

Other taxa
Genus	Species	Higher taxon	Notes	Images
Parafunaria	P. sinensis	Bryophyta?	Possibly the earliest embryophyte fossil, but this has been doubted due to insufficient evidence	
Parallelphyton	P. tipica	Viridiplantae?	Bears differentiation similar to "proto-plants" and the extant Fritschiella	
Walcottophycus	W. gyges	Bryopsidales?	Formerly placed within Bosworthia	Fossil of W. gyges

== GSSP for the Cambrian Series 3 ==
An outcrop of the Kaili Formation, the Wuliu-Zengjiayan section, was a candidate for the GSSP for the beginning of the 5th stage of the Cambrian. The FAD of two trilobites from the formation are proposed to be the official stage boundary, Oryctocephalus indicus and Ovatoryctocara granulata. Both can be correlated with formations of similar age in Siberia and China. In 2018, GSSP for the Miaolingian series (Cambrian Series 3, "Middle" Cambrian) as well as the Wuliuan stage was finally defined in this formation.
