= Carrara Formation =

Geologic formation in Nevada, United States

- Stratigraphic range: Cambrian Stage 4; ~514.5–506.5 Ma
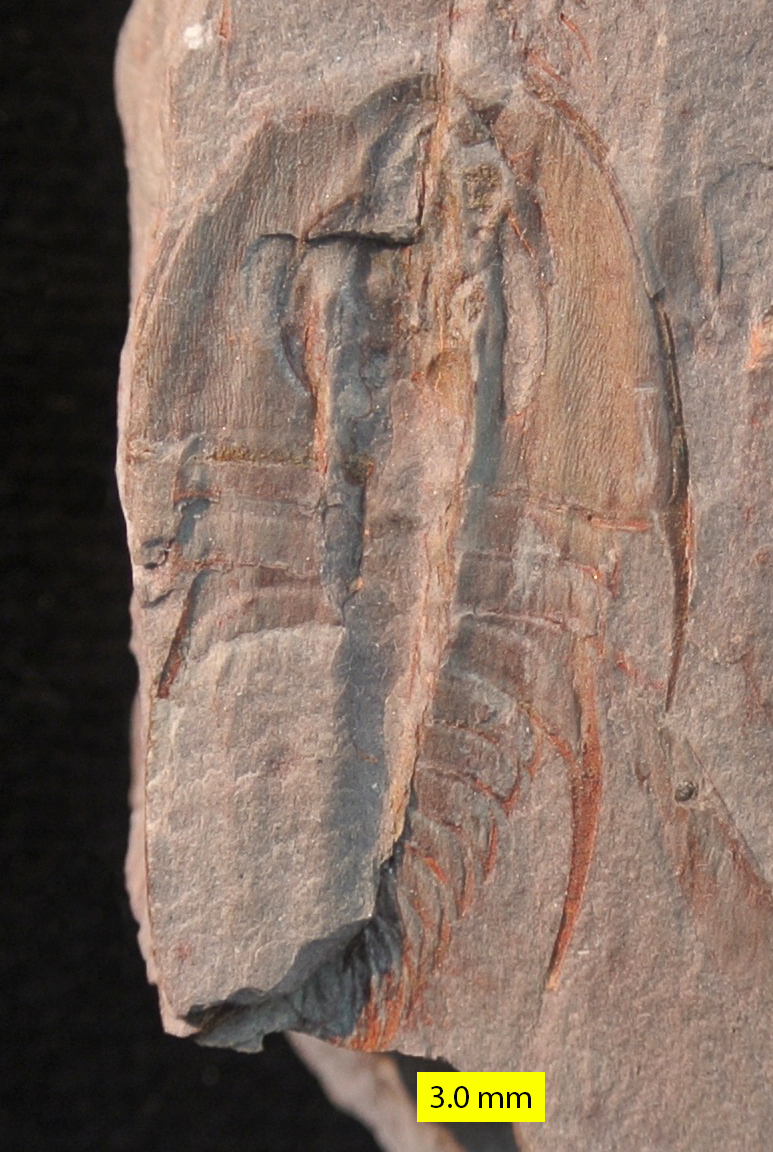
- Fossils from the Pyramid Shale member, Carrara Formation
- Type: Formation
- Sub-units: See: Members
- Underlies: Emigrant Formation; (Bare Mountain) Bonanza King Formation
- Overlies: Zabriskie Quartzite
- Thickness: 0–2,000 feet (0–610 m)

Lithology
- Primary: Siltstone
- Other: Shale, Limestone, Quartzite, Sandstone

Location
- Country: United States

Type section
- Named for: Carrara, Nevada
- Named by: Cornwall and Kleinhampl
- Year defined: 1961

The Carrara Formation is a geologic formation in California and Nevada. It preserves fossils dating back to the Cambrian period.

== History ==
The Carrara Formation would be defined in 1961 by Cornwall and Kleinhampl, with its type section sitting in the Bare Mountain Range in Nevada, and was named for the nearby ghost town of Carrara, where quarries dug into the upper layers of the formation during the turn of the 20th century. Cornwall and Kleinhampl would go on to name five subdivisions of the Carrara Formation, although they did not name them. Then, only a year later in 1962, when Barnes, Christiansen, and Byers would extend the formation beyond its type locality into the Yucca Flat region, which also helped to solve a number of nomenclatural issues on the Nevada Test Site. With this extension of the Carrara Formation, Barnes et al. would go on to increase the number of subdivisions from five to seven, although they were still not given formal names.

Between 1963 and 1970, the Carrara Formation would be further expanded, first into the Nopah Range and Resting Springs Range by Williams, 1963; then into the Spectre Range by Burchfiel, 1964; with a large expansion into the Pahrump Hills, Salt Spring Hills, Dublin Hills, Eagle Mountain, Funeral Mountains, Grapevine Mountains, and Panamint Range by Bates, 1965; as well as an extension into the southern areas of the Last Chance Range by Stewart, 1965. In 1966, multiple extension were made, first into the Silurian Hills by Wright and Troxel, into the wider Death Valley region by Hunt and Mabey, and then into the Desert Range by Stewart and Barnes. Then, in 1967, Barnes and Christiansen would recognise the Carrara Formation in the Groom Range, and also named the second to last member as the "Jangle Limestone Member", although the remaining six at the time would still not unnamed. Finally, in 1970, Stewart would extend the Carrara Formation into the southern Great Basin.

Come 1979, all the remaining unnamed members would finally be given formal names, with the lowest member being split out into a further three, making a grand total of nine members overall.

== Geology ==
The Carrara Formation is primarily composed of olive-gray and greenish-gray siltstones and shales, as well as medium-gray limestone in the lower half of the formation, with medium-gray to yellowish-brown silty limestone and limy limestone in the upper half of the formation. The lower half also contains quartzite rocks, similar to that seen in the underlying Zabriskie Quartzite. In other areas of the lower half, there are olive-gray, greenish-gray or dusky-yellow siltstones and sandy siltstones, along with small amounts of sandstone and limestone. The upper half also contains fine to medium-grained quartzites, white in colour, forming a distinctive band. In other areas of the formation, it instead consists of inter-stratified siltstones, shales and very fine to medium-grained quartzite.

=== Members ===
The Carrara Formation contains in total nine members, which are as follows, in ascending stratigraphic order (lowest to highest):

- Eagle Mountain Shale Member: This is the lowest of the nine members, and is dominated by green to gray-brown silty-shales. Inter-bedded into these shales are thin-beds of terrigenous or carbonate silt-sized and sand-sized grains. The terrigenous inter-beds are primarily composed of quartz sand, and are notably common at the base of the member. Meanwhile, at the top of the member, the carbonate inter-beds become increasingly common, and are composed not only of limestone, but also notably are composed of a high amount of echinoderm and trilobite fragment packstones, set into a muddy matrix. It has been noted that this member is poor in fossil materials, although in some sections a few trilobite species have been recovered.
- Thimble Limestone Member: Named for Thimble Peak in the Grapevine Mountains, this member is the widest, but thinnest, of the nine, only attaining a thickness of 50 m (160 ft), and is predominately composed of thin-bedded black, brown, and orange argillaceous limestone, which is dolomitic in nature. In the eastern sections of the member, it is notably poor in fossil material, although the number of fossils increases in richness going in the northwestern direction, with fragments belonging to hyolithoids, echinoderms, and trilobites being found, as well as oncolite trace fossils.
- Echo Shale Member: Named for Echo Canyon, this member is primarily composed of green micaceous platy shale. It is similar to the Eagle Mountain Shales, although it is notably more calcareous in nature, and contains layers of inter-bedded shale and limestone. Similar to the Eagle Mountain Shales, it is poor in fossil material, with a few records of Olenellus clarki being found, and an undetermined Olenellus species.
- Gold Ace Limestone Member: Named for Gold Ace Mine, this member is dominated my microspar limestone, which is thin- to medium-bedded in nature, with definitions of argillaceous dolomitic burrow horizons throughout. Nearer to the top of the member, the continuous limestone layers are further broken up by burrows, which range from open burrows filled by calcite spar, and sediment filled burrows, containing a variety of recrystallised and uncrystallised oncolites, as well as sparse wackestone and mudstone. It is noted to be moderately rich in fossil material, although these are too decayed or fragmented for proper identification, with only Olenellus puertoblancoensis and O. howelli being identified from the member.
- Pyramid Shale Member: Named for Pyramid Peak in the Funeral Mountains, this member is predominately composed of green shales, which is inter-bedded with layers of brown and maroon siltstone and shale, itself containing small amounts of quartzite and limestone. The member starts shaly at its base, getting increasingly more silty towards the top, with the top itself transitioning into brown siltstones and maroon shales. The member is notably rich in fossil material, although fossil are commonly disarticulated, forming packstones and grainstone in some layers of the member. In the lower 10 m (33 ft) of the member, more identifiable fossils can be found, ranging from the usual Olenellus, to the unusual Biceratops.
- Red Pass Limestone Member: Named for Red Pass in the Grapevine Mountains, this member is dominated by lime mudstones, which notably contains borrows, oncolites and skeletal-fragments. Alongside this, there are also abundant oolites, and layers of laminated lime mudstones and fenestral limestone, which form a thin, very light-gray cap of limestone at the top of the member in its western sections. Towards the east, the member becomes less prominent, with its lime mudstones instead being inter-bedded with green and brown calcareous shales. The majority of the member is notably poor in fossil material, although fossils have been found at the base and top of the member, with the base being dominated by trilobites from the "Plagiura-Poliella" Zone, whilst the top is dominated by trilobites from the "Albertella" Zone.
- Pahrump Hills Shale Member: Named for Pahrump Hills, this member is primarily composed of tan siltstones, shales, and red and green mudstones, with small amounts of argillaceous limestone and fine-grained sandstones throughout. The siltstone at the base of the member is orange-brown in colour, thin-bedded and carbonate-cemented, with laminations of fine-grained sandstone. The base of the member in its southeastward sections is instead composed of brown silty calcareous shale, abundant in echinoderm fragments. Meanwhile, the upper layers of the member is composed of the red, brown and green mudstones and shales, with layers of chloritic and cryptalgal limestones and oolites throughout. Overall, the member is notably poor in fossil materials, but there are collections of trilobites known throughout.
- Jangle Limestone Member: One of the first members to be named, it was named for Jangle Ridge in Halfpint Range, and is predominately composed of five limestone units, separated by layers of argillaceous limestone and calcareous shales. Throughout, there can also be found lime mudstones, trilobite- and echinoderm-fragment bearing wackestones, packstones, and grainstones, oolites, as well as fenestral-fabric and laminated limestone, all of which varying in their distribution, specially when compared to other members such as the Red Pass and Gold Ace Limestone Members, although this variation notably decreases eastward. The member is moderately fossiliferous throughout, getting more diverse in its middle section.
- Desert Range Limestone Member: Named for Desert Range, this member is similar to the Thimble Limestone Member, being primarily composed of black thin-bedded argillaceous limestone, with orange dolomitic partings throughout. There can also be found occasionally throughout the member trilobite packstones and wackestone. The member is notably rich in Glossopleura, due to it being partly within the "Glossopleura" Zone.

== Palaeoenvironment ==
The Carrara Formation was most likely deposited in a shallow, sub-tidal marine environment, inferred from the lack of supra-tidal and inter-tidal sedimentary structures. The oolite and algal-boundstones within the formation may have formed shoals and islands, protecting the deposition area along its western side, whilst to the east the seafloor may have increased in depth, allowing for the accumulation of the lime-mud that would make up a majority of the lime mudstone throughout the formation, although the shallowness of the area would have still permitted an abundance of biological activity, evident by the skeletal carbonates.

== Paleobiota ==
The Carrara Formation contains an abundance of arthropods, like the spiny Bristolia, as well as ichnotaxon like Skolithos, a type of burrow trace fossil. It also contains some examples of Archaeocyatha, a clade of sponges that went extinct during this time.

Color key: Taxon / Reclassified taxon / Taxon falsely reported as present / Dubious taxon or junior synonym / Ichnotaxon / Ootaxon / Morphotaxon	Notes; Uncertain or tentative taxa are in small text; ~~crossed out~~ taxa are discredited.

=== Arthropoda ===
Arthropoda
Genus	Species	Notes	Images
Houcaris (?)	H?. magnabasis	A radiodont arthropod. Previously described as Anomalocaris magnabasis in 2019, but was reassigned to Houcaris in 2021, although this assignment is now up in the air with subsequent analysis suggesting H. magnabasis may not form a monophyletic clade with other species of Houcaris.	
Ursulinacaris	U. grallae	A hurdiid radiodont.	
Albertella	A. longwelli; A. spectrensis	Zacanthoidid trilobites.	
Albertellina	A. aspinosa	A zacanthoidid trilobite.	
Albertelloides	Albertelloides sp.; A. mischi; A. rectimarginatus	Zacanthoidid trilobites.	
Alokistocarella (?)	A. (?) brighamensis	A ptychoparioid trilobite.	
Biceratops	B. anteros	A biceratopsid trilobite.	
Bristolia	B. anteros; B. bristolensis; B. fragilis; B. brachyomma	Olenellid trilobites, all described from this formation. B. brachyomma was originally reported as Olenellus brachyomma, before being synonymised into Bristolia.	
Bolbolenellus	B. euryparia	A biceratopsid trilobite. Previously described as Olenellus euryparia before it was synonymised into Bolbolenellus.	
Caborcella	C. pseudaulax; C. reducta	Ptychoparioid trilobites.	
Chancia	C. venusta; C. (?) maladensis	An alokistocarid trilobites.	
Elrathina	E. antiqua	A ptychoparioid trilobite.	
Fieldaspis (?)	Fieldaspis (?) sp.	A zacanthoidid trilobite.	
Glossopleura	G. walcotti; G. lodensis	Dolichometopid trilobites.	
Kochaspis	K. augusta; K. liliana	Ptychoparioid trilobites.	
Kootenia	K. germana	A dorypygid trilobite.	
Kochiellina	K. groomensis; K. janglensis	Ptychoparioid trilobites.	
Macannaia	M. maladensis	Agnostid. M. maladensis was previously recorded as Pagetia maladensis, before it was synonymised with Macannaia.	
Mesonacis	M. cylindricus; M. fremonti	Olenellid trilobites. M. cylindricus was originally reported as Olenellus cylindricus, whilst M. fremonti was originally reported at Olenellus fremonti, before both were synonymised into Mesonacis.	
Mexicaspis	M. radiatus	A zacanthoidid trilobite.	
Mexicella	M. grandoculus; M. mexicana	Ptychoparioid trilobites.	
Nephrolenellus	N. multinodus	An Biceratopsid trilobite. N. multinodus was originally reported as Olenellus multinodus, before it was synonymised into Nephrolenellus.	
Nyella	N. granosa; N. clinolimbata; N. immoderata; N. immoderata	Ptychoparioid trilobites.	
Ogygopsis	O. typicalis	A dorypygid trilobite.	
Olenellus	O. clarki; O. howelli; O. puertoblancoensis; O. terminatus	Olenellid trilobites. Fossil specimens from the Pyramid Shale Member have been found preserving the first evidence of chitin in trilobites.	
Oryctocephalus	O. nyensis	An oryctocephalid trilobite.	
Oryctocephalina (?)	O. (?) maladensis	An oryctocephalid trilobite.	
Oryctocephalites	O. typicalis	An oryctocephalid trilobite.	
Pagetia	Pagetia sp.; P. resseri; P. rugosa	Pagetiid agnostids.	
Pachyaspis	P. gallagari	A ptychoparioid trilobites.	
Paralbertella	P. bosworthi	A zacanthoidid trilobite.	
Peachella	P. iddingsi; P. brevispina	Biceratopsid trilobites.	
Peronopsis	Peronopsis sp.; P. lautus	Peronopsid agnostids.	
Plagiura	P. extensa; P. retracta; P. cercops; P. minor	Ptychoparioid trilobites.	
Poliella	P. lomataspis; P. germana	A trilobite.	
Ptarmiganoides	P. crassaxis; P. hexacantha	Zacanthoidid trilobites.	
Schistometopus	Schistometopus sp.	A ptychoparioid trilobite.	
Syspacephalus	S. longus; S. obscurus	Ptychoparid trilobites.	
Thoracocare	T. idahoensis	A zacanthoidid trilobite.	
Volocephalina	V. connexa; V. contracta	A ptychoparioid trilobites.	
Zacanthoides	Z. alatus; Z. variacantha	Zacanthoidid trilobites.	

=== Lophotrochozoa ===
Lophotrochozoa
Genus	Species	Notes	Images
Microcornus	Microcornus sp.	Lophotrochozoan hyolith.	
Parkula	Parkula sp.	Lophotrochozoan hyolith.	
Hyolithellus (?)	Hyolithellus (?) sp.	Lophotrochozoan hyolith.	

=== Chancelloriids ===
Chancelloriids
Genus	Species	Notes	Images
Allonia	Allonia sp.	Chancelloriid.	
Chancelloria	Chancelloria sp.	Chancelloriid.	

=== Porifera (Sponges) ===
Porifera
Genus	Species	Notes	Images
Archaeocyathus	Archaeocyathus sp.	Archaeocyathide sponge.	

=== Ichnogenera ===
Ichnogenera
Genus	Species	Notes	Images
Skolithos	S. linearis	Burrows.	

=== Undescribed ===
Undescribed
Genus	Species	Notes	Images
Disc-shaped fossils	"Carrara specimens"	Disc-shaped organisms, resemble either porpitids or eldonids, especially to Discophyllum.	

== See also ==
- List of fossiliferous stratigraphic units in Nevada
- Paleontology in Nevada
- Paleontology in California
