= Monola Formation =

Geologic formation in California

- Stratigraphic range: Middle Cambrian
- Type: Formation
- Overlies: Mule Spring Limestone

Lithology
- Primary: Shale
- Other: Clay, Mudstone, Limestone, Siltstone

Location
- Region: California
- Country: United States

The Monola Formation is a geologic formation in California. It preserves fossils dating back to the Cambrian period.

== Geology ==
The Monola Formation is primarily composed of siliceous shales, and greyish-black clay shale, and calcareous siltstone. In parts of the siliceous shale, there are occasional layers of lime mudstone and bioclastic limestone.

== Paleobiota ==
The Monola Limestone contains a small collection of trilobites, like Glosopleura and Alokistocare.

Color key: Taxon / Reclassified taxon / Taxon falsely reported as present / Dubious taxon or junior synonym / Ichnotaxon / Ootaxon / Morphotaxon	Notes; Uncertain or tentative taxa are in small text; ~~crossed out~~ taxa are discredited.

=== Arthropoda ===
Genus	Species	Notes	Images
Alokistocare	Alokistocare sp.	Ptychoparid trilobite.	
Syspacephalus	Syspacephalus sp.	Ptychoparid trilobite.	
Paraantagmus	P. latus	Ptychoparid trilobite.	
Amecephalus	A. arrojosensis	Ptychoparid trilobite.	
Mexicella	M. robusta	Ptychoparid trilobite.	
Onchocephalites	O. laevis; O. resseri	Ptychoparid trilobite.	
Syspacephalus	S. variosus; S. granulosus (?)	Ptychoparid trilobite.	
Tonopahella	T. goldfieldensis; T. walcotii (?)	Ptychoparid trilobite.	
Nyella (?)	N. (?) plana	Ptychoparid trilobite.	
Glossopleura	Glossopleura sp.	Corynexochid trilobite.	
Oryctocephalus	Oryctocephalus sp.; O. orientalis; O. indicus; O. nyensis	Corynexochid trilobite.	
Microryctocara	M. nevadensis	Corynexochid trilobite.	
Bathyuriscus	Bathyuriscus sp.	Corynexochid trilobite, previously reported as Wenkchemnia sulcata and W. spinicollis.	
Ogygopsis	Ogygopsis sp.	Dorypygid trilobite.	

== See also ==
- List of fossiliferous stratigraphic units in California
- Paleontology in California
