= Saline Valley Formation =

Geologic formation in the Mojave Desert

- Stratigraphic range: Lower Cambrian
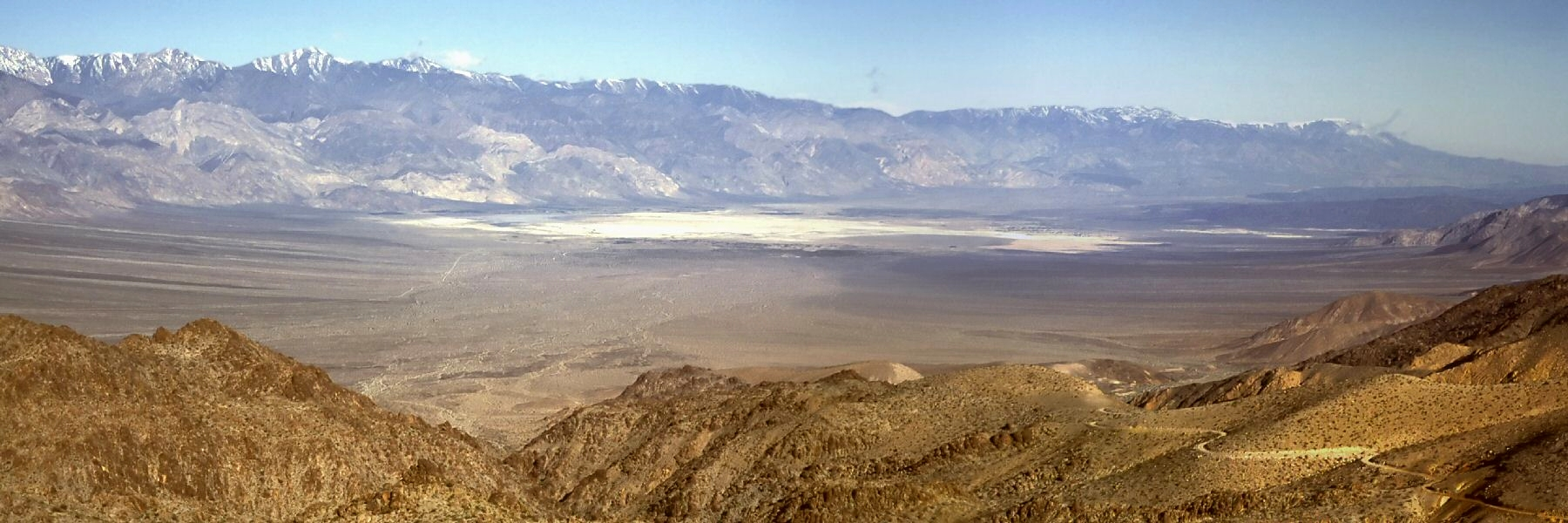
- The Saline Valley, the locality after which the formation is named.
- Type: Formation
- Sub-units: See: Members
- Underlies: Mule Spring Limestone
- Overlies: Harkless Formation
- Thickness: 0–800 feet (0–244 m)

Lithology
- Primary: Quartzite
- Other: Limestone, Shale

Location
- Region: Mojave Desert, Death Valley National Park, California
- Country: United States

Type section
- Named for: The Saline Valley

The Saline Valley Formation is a geologic formation in the Mojave Desert, in Inyo County, California, primarily within the White and Inyo Mountains.

It is located in the Saline Valley of northwestern Death Valley National Park, from which it gets its name from.

It preserves fossils dating back to the Cambrian period.

== Geology ==
The Saline Valley Formation is mainly composed of fine to medium-grained quartzite, sandy limestone and shale. It is overlain by the Mule Spring Limestone, whilst it is underlain by the Harkless Formation.

=== Members ===
The formation only has two members, which are as follows, in ascending stratigraphic order (lowest to highest):

- Lower Member: This can be found in the type area of the formation, which lies within the southeastern sections of the White and Inyo Mountains, and is around 430 ft (130 m) thick. It is primarily composed of fine to medium grained quartzites, quartzitic sandstones, sandstones and limestones, which cap the top 30 ft (9.1 m) of the member, and contains fine to coarse quartz grains, which are rounded. This limestone cap can get up to 190 ft (58 m) within the Andrews Mountain area, and becomes a sandy limestone. The quartzite layers found within this member are considered to be tongues from the Zabriskie Quartzite
- Upper Member: This member can reach up to 400 ft (120 m) thick, and is dominated by gray limestones and greenish-gray shales. In the basal sections of the member, it is primarily composed of medium-gray sandstones and quartzitic sandstone.

In other areas of the formation, predominately in the Andrews Mountain section, the members contain more platy siltstone and fine-grained quartzitic sandstone, which are more finely textured than other sections.

== Paleobiota ==
The Saline Valley Formation contains a small number of ichnogenera, like the movement traces Cruziana, as well as a range of trilobites.

Color key: Taxon / Reclassified taxon / Taxon falsely reported as present / Dubious taxon or junior synonym / Ichnotaxon / Ootaxon / Morphotaxon	Notes; Uncertain or tentative taxa are in small text; ~~crossed out~~ taxa are discredited.

=== Arthropoda ===
Genus	Species	Notes	Images
Olenellus	O. clarki	Olenellid trilobite, previously described as Paedeumias.	
Wanneria	Wanneria sp.	Olenellid trilobite.	
Ogygopsis	Ogygopsis sp.	Dorypygid trilobite.	
Bonnia	Bonnia sp.	Dorypygid trilobite.	
Olenoides	Olenoides sp.	Dorypygid trilobite.	
Goldfieldia	Goldfieldia sp.	Corynexochid trilobite.	
Zacanthopsis	Zacanthopsis sp.	Corynexochid trilobite.	
Bristolia	Bristolia sp.	Biceratopsid trilobite.	
Syspacephalus	Syspacephalus sp.	Ptychoparid trilobite.	

=== Lophotrochozoa ===
Genus	Species	Notes	Images
Hyolithida	???	Lophotrochozoan hyoliths.	

=== Ichnogenera ===
Genus	Species	Notes	Images
Cruziana	Cruziana sp.	Trails.	
Teichichnus	Teichichnus sp.	Feeding trace.	

== See also ==
- List of fossiliferous stratigraphic units in California
- Paleontology in California
