= Shishania =

Shishania Temporal range: Early Cambrian (Stage 4), ~514–509 Ma

Scientific classification
- Kingdom: Animalia
- Order: †Chancelloriida
- Genus: †Shishania
- Species: †S. aculeata

Binomial name
- †Shishania aculeata Zhang et al., 2024

Genus of Cambrian animals

Shishania is a genus of animals from the Cambrian period. It contains a single species, Shishania aculeata, originally described as a stem-group mollusc. Shishania specimens come from the Wulongqing Formation in China, and date back to around 514 to 509 million years ago. Shishania was a flattened, bilaterally symmetrical slug-like animal with a muscular foot. It had no shell, but was covered in hollow chitinous spines. These sclerites provide a stepping stone between the solid chaetae-like chitinous sclerites of Wiwaxia and the partially hollow, biomineralized sclerites of aculiferan molluscs. This suggests the mollusc ancestor was covered in hollow chitinous sclerites that shared a common origin with annelid chaetae.

A paper published in Science in May 2025 disputes the classification of Shishania as a mollusc. Instead, the authors suggest it is an early-diverging chancelloriid closely affiliated to, or even synonymous with, Nidelric.
