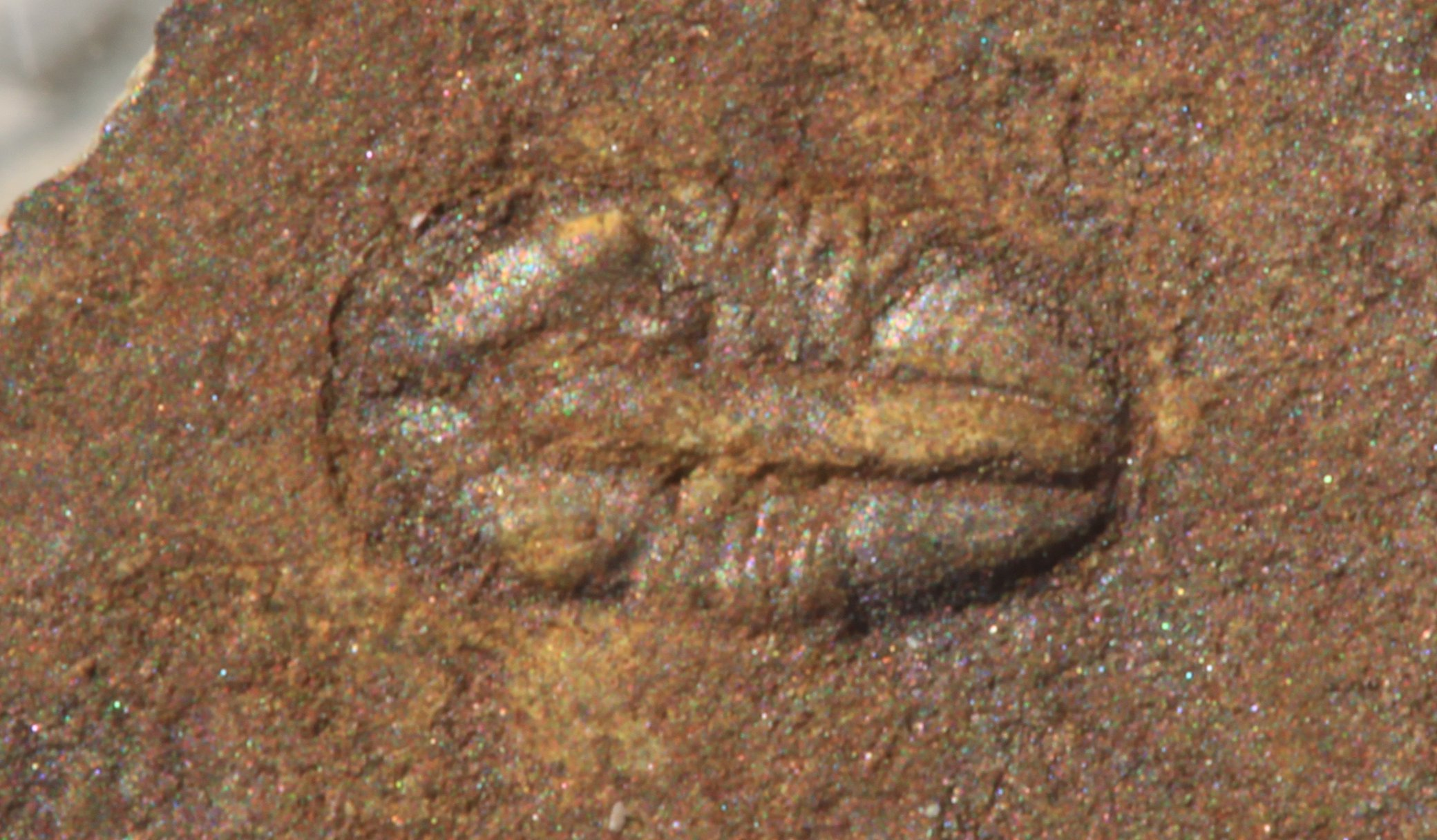
- Pagetia taijiangensis, 6mm, from Kaili, Guizhou, China, Middle Cambrian

Scientific classification
- Domain: Eukaryota
- Kingdom: Animalia
- Phylum: Arthropoda
- Class: †Trilobita (?)
- Order: †Agnostida
- Suborder: †Eodiscina
- Superfamily: †Eodiscoidea
- Family: †Eodiscidae; Raymond, 1913

Genera
- Eodiscus; Dawsonia; Helepagetia; Kiskinella; Macannaia; Opsidiscus; Pagetia; Pagetides; Sinopagetia

Synonyms
- Aulacodiscidae; Dawsoniidae; Opsidiscidae; Pagetidae; Pagetiellinae

= Eodiscidae =

Eodiscidae Temporal range: Lower and Middle Cambrian

Eodiscidae is a family of agnostid trilobites that lived during the final Lower Cambrian (late Toyonian) and the Middle Cambrian. They are small or very small, and have a thorax of two or three segments. Eodiscidae includes nine genera (see box).

== Taxonomy ==
The Eodiscids probably descended from the agnostids of family Yukoniidae.

== Description ==
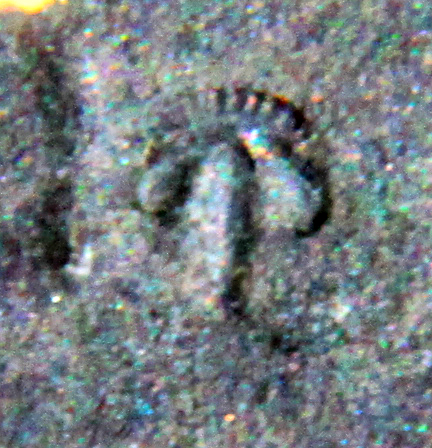
Internal moult of the cranidium of Pagetia fossula, 2mm, showing scrobiculate border and glabellar spine

Like other agnostids, the body of eodiscids is diminutive, the headshield (or cephalon) and tailshield (or pygidium) are of approximately same size, with 2 or 3 thoracic segments in-between, each consisting of a horizontal inner portion that abruptly passes into an inclined outer portion (fulcrate). The central raised area of the cephalon (or glabella) is narrow, usually with parallel sides and rounded front. The furrow between the occipital ring and the more frontal parts of the glabella are a pair of pits low on its sides beneath a large median spine extending from the glabella backwards. The distance between the glabella and the border (or preglabellar area) is usually long. This border has dozens of small furrows radiating inward (a so-called scrobiculate border), but this defining feature may be absent in effaced species or destroyed by poor preservation. The axis of the pygidium has four to ten rings.
