= Archiasterella =

Archiasterella Temporal range: Early Cambrian–Middle Cambrian

Scientific classification
- Domain: Eukaryota
- Kingdom: Animalia
- Order: †Chancelloriida
- Family: †Chancelloriidae
- Genus: †Archiasterella; Sdzuy, 1969

Species
- A. anchoriformis Peng et al., 2023; A. fletchergryllus Randell et al, 2003; A. hirundo Bengston, 1990 (in Bengston et al); A. pentactina Sdzuy, 1969 (type)

Cambrian fossils

Achiasterella is a genus of scleritophoran known from the Burgess Shale and earlier (Branchian) deposits, and originally described as Chancelloria by Walcott. The species may represent form taxa rather than true species.
