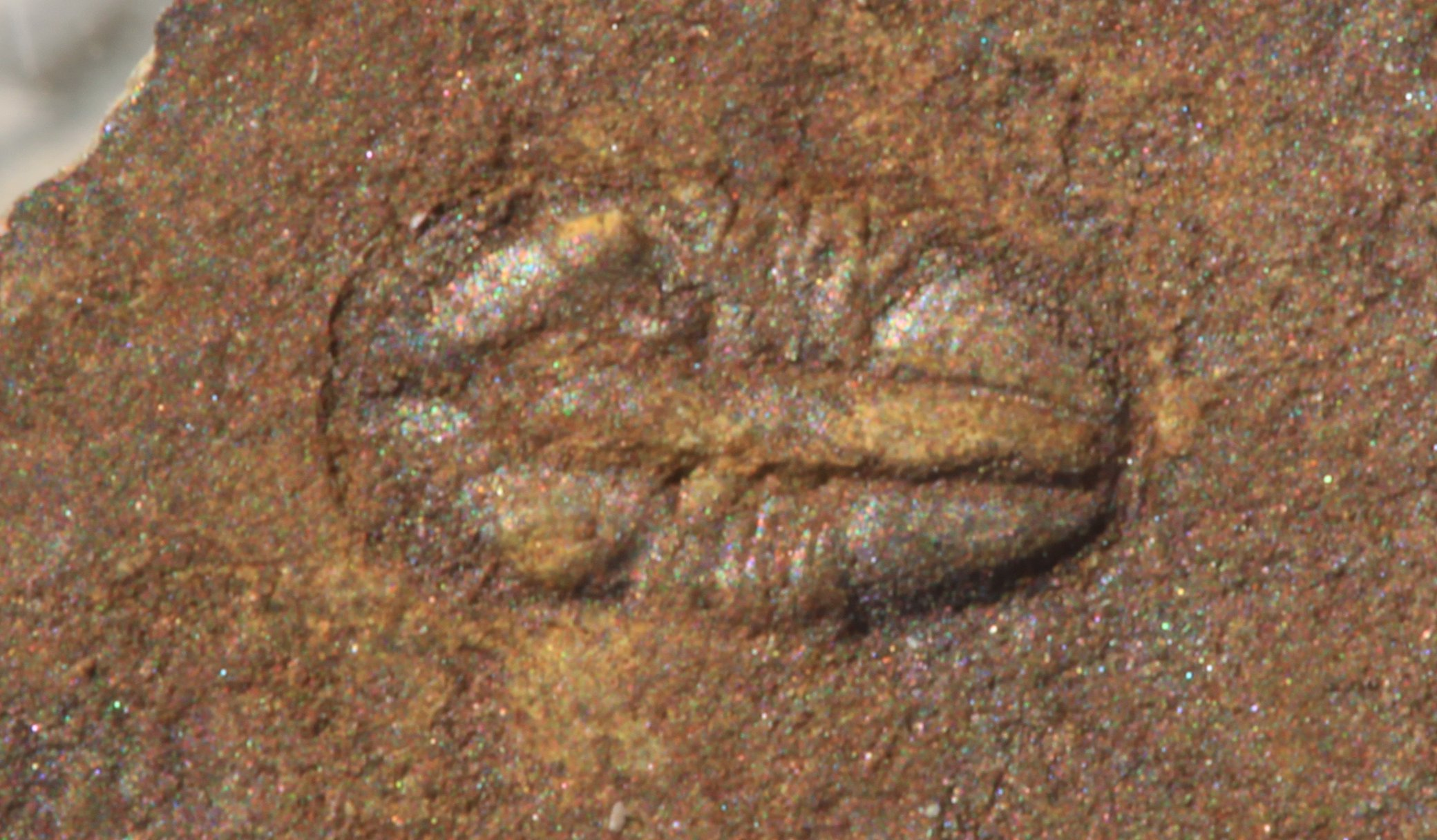
- A heavily eroded specimen of Pagetia taijiangensis, 6 mm, from Kaili, Guizhou, China

Scientific classification
- Kingdom: Animalia
- Phylum: Arthropoda
- Clade: †Artiopoda
- Class: †Trilobita (?)
- Order: †Agnostida
- Family: †Eodiscidae
- Genus: †Pagetia; Walcott, 1916

Species
- P. bootes Walcott, 1916 (type species); P. aspinosa Sundberg, 2018; P. bigranulosa Rasetti, 1967; P. billingsi Rasetti, 1945; P. bilobata Lu & Chien, 1978; P. claytonensis Sundberg, 2018; P. clytia Walcott, 1916 = Mesopagetia clytia; P. clytioides Rasetti, 1967; P. connexa (Walcott, 1887) = Microdiscus connexus; P. danzhaiensis Zhang, 1980; P. dayongensis Liu, 1982; P. divulgata Bognibova, 1965; P. edura Jell, 1975; P. ellsi Rasetti, 1945; P. erratica Rasetti, 1967; P. fluitata Jell, 1975; P. fossula Resser, 1938; P. gaotaiensis Zhang, 1980; P. hainesi Laurie, 2006; P. horrida Lermontova, 1951; P. howardi Jell, 1975; P. inermis (Rasetti, 1966) = P. billingsi inermis; P. inferstrix Jell, 1975; P. jingheensis; P. laevis Rasetti, 1967; P. latilimbata Chien, 1961; P. leptoskolos Jell, 1975; P. longispina Palmer & Gatehouse, 1972; P. luoyacunensis Lin & Jago 1993; P. macrommatia Jell, 1975; P. maladensis Resser, 1939; P. miaoubanpoensis; P. morrisi Laurie, 2006; P. ocellata Jell, 1970; P. oepiki Jell, 1975; P. parabootes Zhang, 1981; P. pollusta Jell, 1975; P. polygnota Jell, 1975; P. prolata Jell, 1975; P. quebecensis Rasetti, 1966; P. rasettii Young & Ludvigsen, 1989; P. resseri Kobayashi, 1943; P. rugosa Rasetti, 1966; P. salebra Jell, 1975; P. salva Lu & Qian; P. significans Ethelridge, 1902 = Eopagetia significans; P. silicunda Jell, 1975; P. sinesculata; P. skraelingi Young & Ludvigsen, 1989; P. spiniger; P. stenoloma Palmer, 1968; P. taijiangensis Yuan & Zhao, 1997; P. thornstonensis Jell, 1975; P. triaena Jell, 1975; P. vinusta Lu and Qian in Lu et al., 1974; P. walcotti Rasetti, 1966; P. whithousei Jell, 1975

Synonyms
- Eopagetia; Mesopagetia

= Pagetia =

Pagetia Temporal range: Middle Cambrian

Genus of trilobites

Pagetia is a genus of small trilobite, assigned to the family Eodiscidae and which had global distribution during the Middle Cambrian. The genus contains 55 currently recognized species, each with limited spatial and temporal ranges.

== Type species ==
Pagetia bootes Walcott, 1916, from the middle Cambrian (late Wuliuan or base Drumian) Burgess Shale fossil Lagerstätte. The species occurs with Ptychagnostus praecurrens and derives originally from the "greater phyllopod bed" of Walcott quarry on "Fossil Ridge" between Wapta Mountain and Mount Field, approximately 5 kilometres north of Field, British Columbia in the Canadian Rocky Mountains. The presence of Pt. praecurrens, indicates correlation with the Swedish praecurrens Biozone (Baltoparadoxides pinus Biosubzone, A2 of Westergård 1946, pp. 98–100) in the upper part of the oelandicus Superzone.

== Taxonomy ==
Order: Agnostida Salter, 1864. Suborder: Eodiscina Kobayashi, 1939. Family: PAGETIIDAE Kobayashi 1935. Genus: Pagetia Walcott, 1916. (op. cit.).

=== Species previously assigned to Pagetia ===
- P. attleborensis = Hebediscus attleborensis
- P. jinnanensis = Sinopagetia jinnanensis
- P. maladensis = Macannaia maladensis
- P. medicinalis (plant, Rutaceae) = Bosistoa medicinalis
- P. monostylis (plant, Rutaceae) = Bosistoa medicinalis

== Description ==
A genus of the family Pagetiidae and mainly differentiated from members of the Eodiscidae in having eyes and proparian facial sutures. In the type species, Pagetia bootes Walcott, 1916, there is a well-defined preglabellar median furrow separating the genae. Glabella is well defined, tapers slightly forward and has a well developed spine extending rearwards from the glabella. Anterior border is crenulated, which is common amongst both Eodiscidae and Pagetiidae. No genal spines. Thorax of two segments; pleurae fulcrate with anterior pleural tips pointing backwards and those of the posterior segment directed forwards to enable enrolment. Pygidial axis is well defined, reaching or overhanging the posterior border, usually with five rings and commonly extending backwards into a prominent postaxial spine.

The hypostome is a convex subquadrate plate, positioned directly under frontal part of the glabella. It is comparable to the hypostoma of other trilobites and provides an argument that Agnostida can be regarded as specialized, simplified trilobites.

== Ontogeny ==
The ontogenetic (or growth) series of Pagetia vinusta Lu and Qian in Lu et al., 1974 was described in a research paper by Cui et al. (2019) on the basis of numerous articulated individuals and many disarticulated sclerites from the Cambrian (Wuliuan) Kaili Formation, Guizhou, southwestern China.

== Ecology ==
Several species of Pagetia are known from the Burgess Shale. 1022 specimens of Pagetia are known from the Greater Phyllopod bed, where they comprise 1.94% of the community. and its remains have been found in the otherwise-empty tubes of the polychaete worm Selkirkia.
