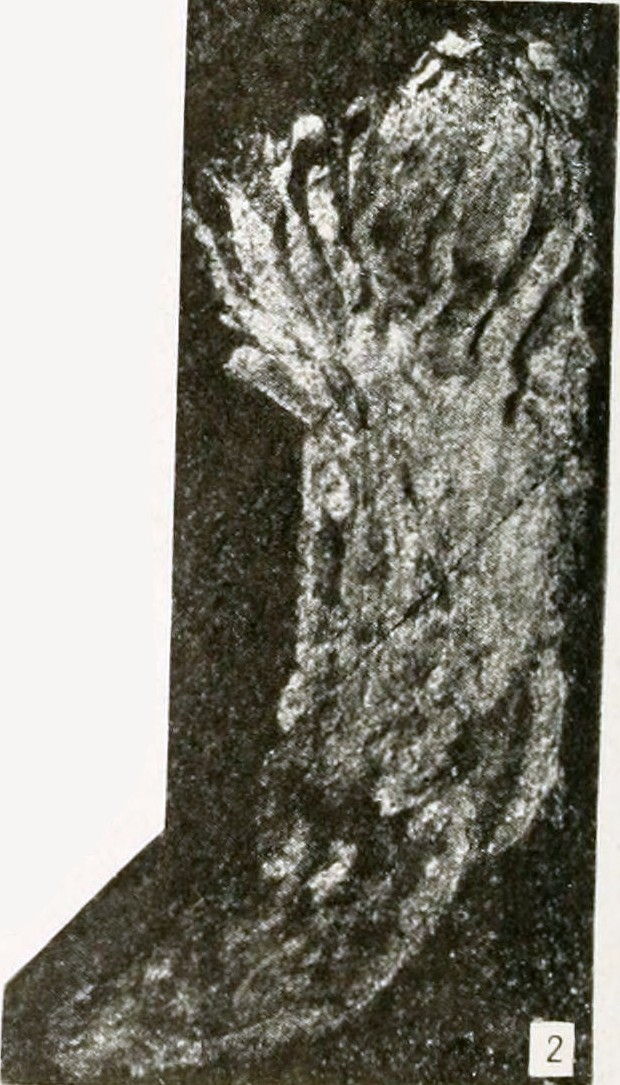
- W. gyges

Scientific classification
- Clade: Viridiplantae
- Division: Chlorophyta (?)
- Genus: †Walcottophycus
- Species: †W. gyges

Binomial name
- †Walcottophycus gyges Wu et al 2016 (Walcott 1919)

= Walcottophycus =

Walcottophycus Temporal range: Burgess Shale

Extinct genus of alga

Walcottophycus is a probable green algae with a wefty construction, known from the mid-Cambrian Burgess Shale and Kaili Formations. Its single species, W. gyges, was originally assigned to the similar algal genus Bosworthia.
