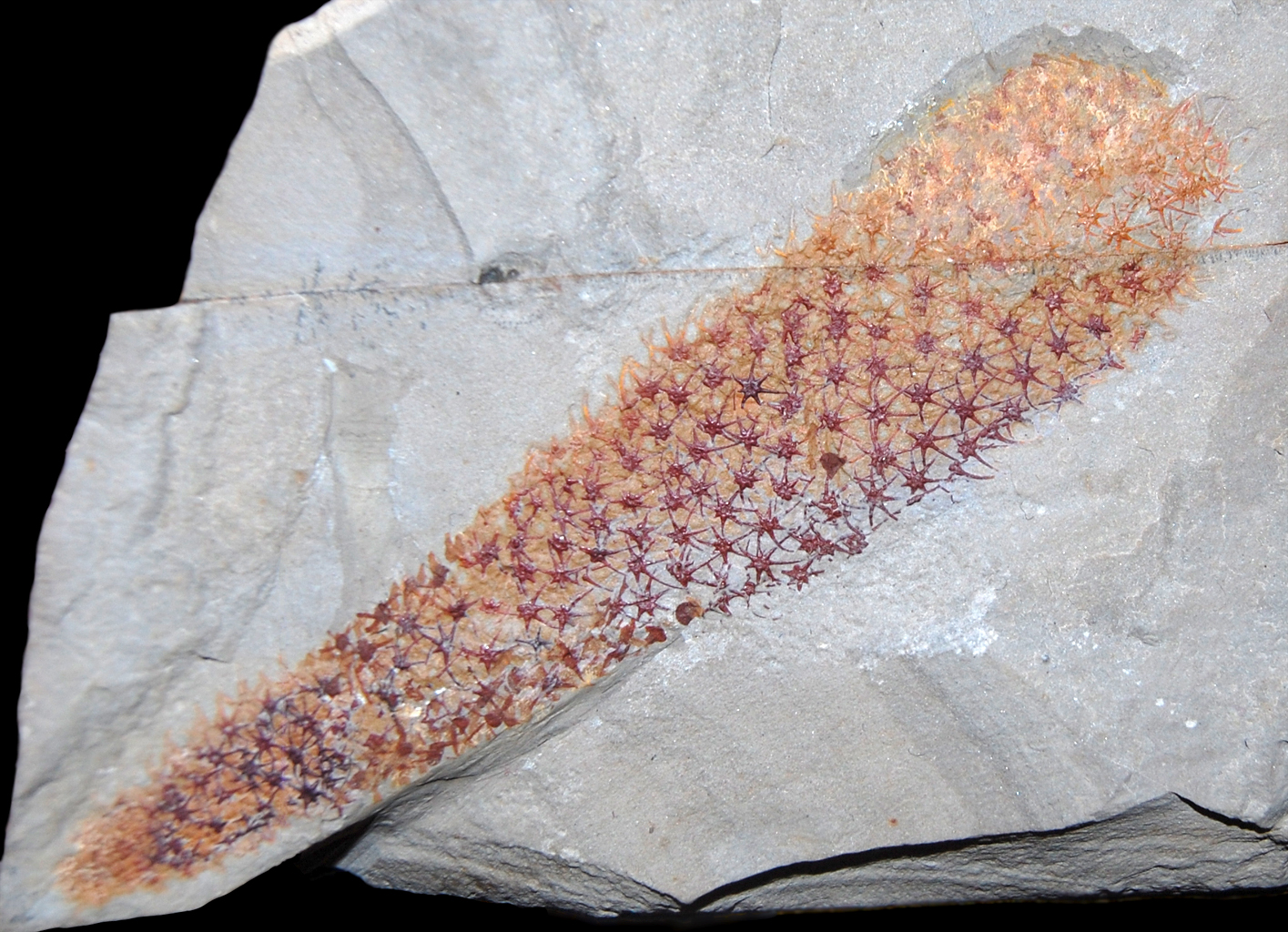
- Fossil of Chancelloria
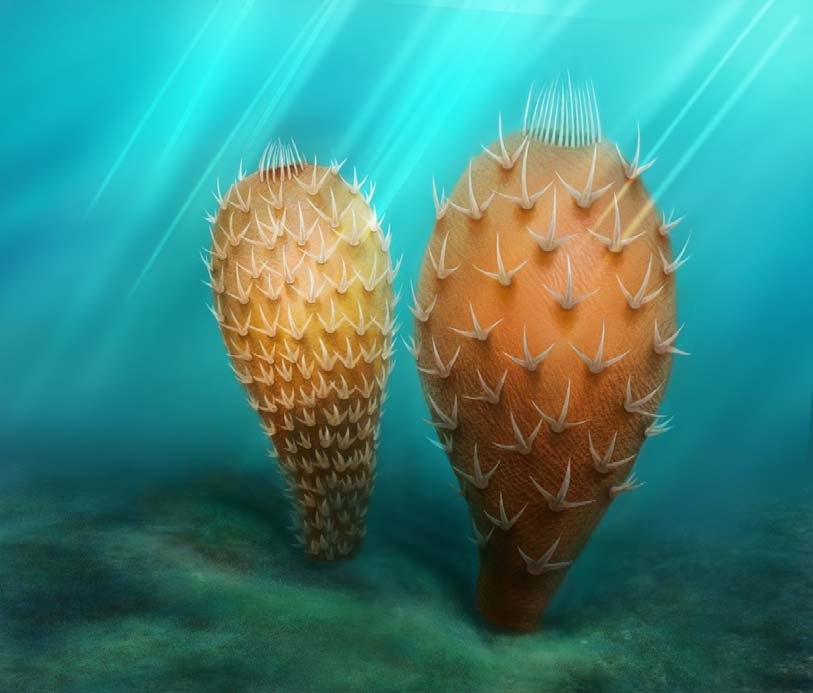
- Life restoration of two species of Allonnia from the Chengjiang biota

Scientific classification
- Kingdom: Animalia
- Order: †Chancelloriida; Walcott, 1920
- Family: †Chancelloriidae; Walcott, 1920

Genera
- See text.

= Chancelloriidae =

Chancelloriidae Temporal range: Early Cambrian–Late Cambrian

Extinct family of Cambrian organisms

The Chancelloriids are an extinct family of superficially sponge-like animals common in sediments from the Early Cambrian to the early Late Cambrian. Many of these fossils consists only of spines and other fragments, and it is not certain that they belong to the same type of organism. Other specimens appear to be more complete and to represent sessile, radially symmetrical hollow bag-like organisms with a soft skin armored with star-shaped calcareous sclerites from which radiate sharp spines.

Classifying the chancelloriids is difficult. Some paleontologists classify them as sponges, an idea which chancelloriids' sessile lifestyle and simple structure make plausible. Other proposals suggest that they were more advanced, or at least originated from more advanced ancestors; for example chancelloriids' skins appear to be much more complex than those of any sponge. It has been suggested that chancelloriids were related to the "chain mail" armored slug-like halkieriids, which are typically considered to be stem-group molluscs. While the sclerites of the two groups are very similar right down to the microscopic level, the large dissimilarity in the body plans of the two groups is difficult to reconcile with this hypothesis. The proposed clade containing the two groups, "Coeloscleritophora", is generally not thought to be monophyletic. Recent research has suggested that chancellorids represent an independent group of basal eumetazoans.

== Occurrence ==
Chancelloriid fossils have been found in many parts of the world, including various parts of Asia (e.g. Siberia, China, Mongolia), Australia's Georgina Basin, Canada's Burgess Shale, and the United States. The earliest known fossils come from the small shelly fossil assemblage of the Anabarites trisulcatus Zone of the Lower Nemakit-Daldynian Stage, Siberia and its analog in China is the Anabarites trisulcatus-Protohertzina anabarica Zone of the basal Meishucunian Stage. The fossil record suggests that chancelloriids declined rapidly during the Late Cambrian, and they were probably extinct by the end of the Cambrian.

They were first described in 1920 by Charles Doolittle Walcott, who regarded them as one of the most primitive groups of sponges.

== Description ==
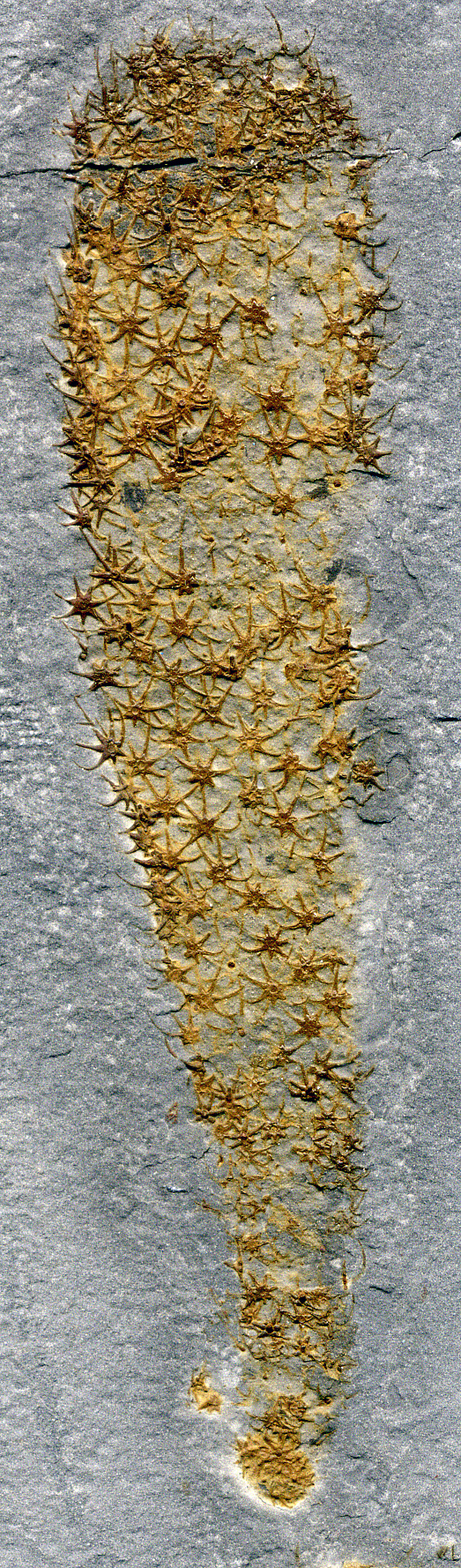
Chancelloria eros fossil, Wheeler Shale, House Range, Utah

The chancelloriids had bag-like bodies with an orifice at the top, and show no evidence of internal organs. The different species show a variety of shapes and sizes, for example: Chancelloria eros was a slim cone with the narrow end at the bottom, typically 4 to 6 centimetres (1.6 to 2.4 in) long and 1.5 to 2 centimetres (0.59 to 0.79 in) in diameter at its widest point; Allonnia junyani formed a disk or cylinder usually 6 to 7 centimetres (2.4 to 2.8 in) in diameter, and the tallest were about 20 centimetres (7.9 in) long.

Most of the fossils consist of collections of mineralized hard parts called sclerites, and an assembly that is thought to have belonged to one individual is called a scleritome. Many specimens consist only of scattered sclerites, whose form is used to classify them, and some specimens have not yet been assigned to a species or even genus.

Individual sclerites had star-shaped bases that lay flat against the body and one spine projecting outwards at a right angle. The sclerites had internal cavities and in fact many are preserved as castings of the cavities filled with phosphate. It is thought that when the animals were alive these cavities were filled with tissues that secreted the hard outer coverings. It is not clear what the hard substance of the walls was since it has been replaced or converted to a different crystalline form. This suggests it was a slightly unstable material such as aragonite, a form of calcium carbonate. Some sclerites appear to be on top of the skin, other covered by it, and some appear partly covered.

== Lifestyle ==
Chancelloriids probably lived on muddy sea-floors, as their sclerites increase in size from the bottom to the top, and all had thickenings at the bases, which are regarded as anchors; they are often preserved in attachment to other organisms or shelly debris. They were very likely filter-feeders.

Since the sclerites were external and non-interlocking, they could not have functioned as supporting "struts". Since the body was sessile and attached to the sea-bed, the sclerites would not have aided locomotion by increasing traction. So the only conceivable function for the sclerites appears to be defence against predators, rather similar to the spines on modern cacti.

== Classification ==
=== List of genera ===
==== Chancelloriidae ====
- Aldanispinella Vasil'eva, 1998
- Aldanospina Missarzhevsky, 1989
- Allonnia Doré and Reid, 1965
- Archiasterella Sdzuy, 1969
- Chancelloria Walcott, 1920
- Diffusasterella Demidenko in Gravestock et al., 2001
- Dimidia Jiang in Luo et al., 1982
- Elkanospina Missarzhevsky, 1989
- Ginospina Missarzhevsky, 1989
- Platyspinites Vassiljeva, 1985
- Tuserospina Missarzhevsky, 1989
- Zhurinia Missarzhevsky, 1989

==== Sachitidae ====
- Sinosachites Jell, 1981
- Sachites Jell, 1981
- Thambetolepis Qian, 1977

==== Possible chancelloriids ====
- Archicladium Qian and Xiao, 1984
- Cambrothyra Qian and Zhang, 1983
- Diplospinella Vasil'eva, 1998
- Eremactis Bengtson & Conway Morris in Bengtson et al., 1990
- Nidelric Hou et al., 2014
- Polycladium Qian and Xiao, 1984
- Shishania Zhang et al., 2024

=== Affinities ===
The classification of chancelloriids is difficult, contentious and important to paleontologists' view of the evolution of multi-celled animals. Walcott classified chancelloriids as sponges, a view that was first questioned by Bengston and colleagues, who considered the hollow, multi-part spicules to be quite unlike anything secreted by a sponge. Butterfield and Nicholas (1996) argued that they were closely related to sponges on the grounds that the detailed structure of chancellorid sclerites is similar to that of fibers of spongin, a collagen protein, in modern keratose (horny) demosponges such as Darwinella.

However Janussen, Steiner and Zhu (2002) opposed this view, arguing that: spongin does not appear in all Porifera, but may be a defining feature of the demosponges; the silica-based spines of demosponges are secreted by specialist sclerocyte cells that surround them, while mineralized chancellorid sclerites were hollow and filled with soft tissues connected to the rest of the animal by restricted openings in the bases of the sclerites; chancellorid sclerites were probably made of aragonite, which is not found in demosponges, and the only sponges that use aragonite are the sclerosponges, whose soft bodies cover hard, often massive skeletons made of either aragonite or calcite, another form of calcium carbonate; sponges have loosely bound-together skins called pinacoderms, which are only one cell thick, while the skins of chancellorids were much thicker and shows signs of connective structures called belt desmosomes. In their opinion the presence of belt desmosomes made chancellorids members of the Epitheliozoa, the next higher taxon above the Porifera, to which sponges belong. They thought it was difficult to say whether chancellorids were members of the Eumetazoa, "true animals" whose tissues are organized into Germ layers; chancellorids' lack of organs such as sense organs, muscles and a gut would seem to exclude them from the Eumetazoa; but possibly chancellorids descended from Eumetazoans that lost these features after becoming sessile filter-feeders.

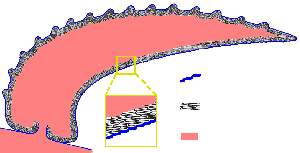
Coelosclerite structure. This diagram is from a microscopic examination of a halkieriid sclerite, but the internal structures of chancelloriid sclerites are almost identical despite the difference in external shapes.

Porter (2008) argued that the sclerites of chancelloriids are extremely similar to those of the halkieriids, mobile bilaterian animals that looked like slugs in chain mail and whose fossils are found in rocks from the very Early Cambrian to the Mid Cambrian. The hollow "coelosclerites" of halkieriids and chancelloriids resemble each other at all levels: both have a thin external organic layer, and an internal "pulp cavity" that is connected to the rest of the body by a narrow channel; the walls of both are made of the same material, aragonite; the arrangement of the aragonite fibers in each is the same, running mainly from base to tip but with each being closer to the surface at the end nearest the tip. Porter thought it extremely improbable that totally unrelated organisms could have developed such similar sclerites independently, but the huge difference in the structures of their bodies makes it hard to see how they could be closely related. This dilemma, she suggested, may be resolved in various ways:

- One possibility is that chancelloriids evolved from bilaterian ancestors but then adopted a sessile lifestyle and rapidly lost all unnecessary features. However the gut and other internal organs have not been lost in other bilaterians that lost their external bilateral symmetry, such as echinoderms, priapulids, and kinorhynchs.
- On the other hand, perhaps chancelloriids are similar to the organisms from which bilaterians evolved. That would imply that the earliest bilaterians had similar coelosclerites. However, there are no fossils of such sclerites before 542 million years ago, while Kimberella from 555 million years ago, which shows no evidence of sclerites, was almost certainly a bilaterian.
- One solution to this dilemma may be that preservation of small shelly fossils by coatings of phosphate was common only for a relatively short time, during the Early Cambrian, and that coelosclerite-bearing organisms were alive several million years before and after the time of phosphatic preservation. In fact there are over 25 cases of phosphatic preservation between 542 million years ago and 521 million years ago, but only one between 555 million years ago and 542 million years ago.
- Alternatively, perhaps the ancestors of both chancelloriids and halkieriids had very similar but unmineralized coelosclerites, and at some intermediate time independently incorporated aragonite into these very similar structures.
- It is also possible that the morphology of the spines is plesiomorphic for eumetazoans, but was subsequently lost in all other groups, making Coeloscleritophora paraphyletic rather than polyphyletic.

A 2025 study suggest that the chancelloriids is a monophyletic clade that branched from other animals after the Placozoa but before Cnidaria and Bilateria.
