= Sachites =

Sachites Temporal range: Cambrian, 530–513 Ma

Scientific classification
- Kingdom: Animalia
- Order: †Chancelloriida
- Family: †Sachitidae
- Genus: †Sachites; Meshkova, 1969

Type species
- Sachites longus Qian, 1977

Species
- S. alatus Duan, 1984; S. desquamatus Duan, 1984; S. folliformis Duan, 1984; S. longus Qian, 1977; S. maidipingensis Qian, 1977; S. minus Qian et al., 1979; S. terastios Qian et al., 1979

Extinct genus of invertebrates

Sachites (Meshkova 1969) is an extinct genus of halkeriid that is only known from fossilised spiny sclerites; many Sachites specimens are now referred to as other halkieriid taxa. Although believed to be related to the halkieriids, a chancelloriid affinity has more recently been proposed.

Sachites has seven species; the type species Sachites longus was named and described in 1977.
