= Mule Spring Limestone =

American geologic formation

- Stratigraphic range: Lower Cambrian
- Type: Formation
- Underlies: Monola Formation (Saline Range); Emigrant Formation (Split Mountain)
- Overlies: Saline Valley Formation (Saline Range); Harkless Formation (Split Mountain)
- Thickness: 0–1,000 feet (0–305 m)

Lithology
- Primary: Limestone
- Other: Siltstone, Shale,

Location
- Region: Mojave Desert, California, Nevada
- Country: United States

The Mule Spring Limestone is a geologic formation in the Saline Range of eastern California and Split Mountain and Goldfield Hills of Nevada. It can also be found outcropping in the Inyo Mountains and White Mountains.

The formation also preserves fossils, primarily trilobites, dating back to the Cambrian period.

== Geology ==
The Mule Spring Limestone, as its name suggests, is mainly composed of limestone rocks. These rocks are medium-gray to light-medium-gray, as well as very fine to fine crystalline, and is thin to very thin-bedded in most areas. In the lower sections of the formation, there are also occasional layers, up to 500 ft (150 m) thick, of pale-yellowish-brown or greenish-gray shale, limy siltstone and silty limestone. In the Split Mountain, the formation overlies the Harkless Formation and underlies the Emigrant Formation, whilst in other areas it overlies the Saline Valley Formation and underlies the Monola Formation.

== Paleobiota ==
The Mule Spring Limestone contains examples of Archaeocyatha, a clade of sponges that went extinct during this time, as well as a collection of trilobites.

Color key: Taxon / Reclassified taxon / Taxon falsely reported as present / Dubious taxon or junior synonym / Ichnotaxon / Ootaxon / Morphotaxon	Notes; Uncertain or tentative taxa are in small text; ~~crossed out~~ taxa are discredited.

=== Arthropoda ===
Genus	Species	Notes	Images
Bristolia	Bristolia sp.; B. harringtoni; B. insolens; B. bristolensis; B. anteros; B. fragilis	Biceratopsid trilobites.	
Peachella	Peachella sp.	Biceratopsid trilobite.	
Mesonacis	Mesonacis sp.	Olenellid trilobite. Mesonacis sp. previously described as Fremontia sp. which was later synonymised into Mesonacis.	
Olenellus	Olenellus sp.; O. puertoblancoensis(?)	Olenellid trilobite. Olenellus sp. previously described as Paedumias sp. which was later synonymised into Olenellus.	
Onchocephalus	Onchocephalus sp.	Ptychoparid trilobite.	
Ptychoparioid	Ptychoparioid sp. A; Ptychoparioid sp. B; Ptychoparioid sp. C; Ptychoparioid sp. D	Ptychoparid trilobites.	
Bonnia	Bonnia sp.	Dorypygid trilobite.	
Crassifimbra	Crassifimbra sp.	Trilobite, family unknown.	

=== Porifera (Sponges) ===
Genus	Species	Notes	Images
Archaeocyathus	Archaeocyathus sp.	Archaeocyathide sponge.	

=== Flora ===
Genus	Species	Notes	Images
Girvanella	Girvanella sp.	Cyanobacteria structures.	

== See also ==
- List of fossiliferous stratigraphic units in Nevada
- Paleontology in Nevada
