= Cambrothyra =

Cambrothyra Temporal range: Lower Cambrian

Scientific classification
- Kingdom: Animalia
- Phylum: incertae sedis
- Class: †Coeloscleritophora
- Genus: †Cambrothyra

Species
- C. ampulliformis Qian and Zhang, 1983

Synonyms
- ?Mirabichitina (nomen nudum) Yand, He, and Deng, 1983; ?Nanjiangochitina (nomen nudum) Yang, He, and Deng, 1983; ?Mirabifolliculus Yang and He, 1984; ?Nanjiangofolliculus Yang and He, 1984; Acatomus Duan, 1986; Clinopa Duan, 1986; Horridomus Duan, 1986.; Hubeitesta Duan, 1986; Situlitesta Duan, 1986; Ovitesta Duan, 1986; Trymitesta Duan, 1986; Pollofructus Geng and Zhang, 1987; Globifructus Geng and Zhang, 1987; Parahorridomus Duan, Cao, and Zhang, 1993; Laxicavia Duan, Cao, and Zhang, 1993; Turbinella Duan, Cao, and Zhang, 1993; Cyphinites Duan, Cao, and Zhang, 1993; Tympanites Duan, Cao, and Zhang, 1993; Lapistamnia Duan, Cao, and Zhang, 1993

Extinct genus of Cambrian animals

Cambrothyra (not to be confused with Cambrorhytium) is a Lower Cambrian coeloscleritophoran from China. The fossils are hollow cones with porous walls that had an originally fibrous aragonitic mineralogy. These conical sclerites were generally not connected to other sclerites; only occasionally are they paired or twinned. The genus comprises the sole species C. ampulliformis.
