= Bosworthia =

Bosworthia Temporal range: Burgess Shale

Scientific classification
- Domain: Eukaryota
- (unranked): Archaeplastida
- Division: Rhodophyta
- Class: Florideophyceae
- Genus: †Bosworthia C.D.Walcott

Extinct genus of algae

Bosworthia is a genus of branching photosynthetic alga known from the Middle Cambrian Burgess Shale. 20 specimens of Bosworthia are known from the Greater Phyllopod bed, where they comprise 0.04% of the community. One of its two original species has since been reassigned to Walcottophycus.
