= Oryctocephalus indicus =

Oryctocephalus indicus Temporal range: Wuliuan

Scientific classification
- Kingdom: Animalia
- Phylum: Arthropoda
- Clade: †Artiopoda
- Class: †Trilobita
- Order: †Corynexochida
- Family: †Oryctocephalidae
- Genus: †Oryctocephalus
- Species: †O. indicus

Binomial name
- †Oryctocephalus indicus (Reed, 1910)

Synonyms
- Zacanthoides indicus Reed, 1910

Extinct species of trilobite

Oryctocephalus indicus is a species of corynexochid trilobite from the Cambrian. Its first appearance is proposed for the lower boundary of the Wuliuan, which corresponds to the beginning of the Miaolingian (The other proposal was Ovatoryctocara granulata). The species was first described by the British paleontologist Frederick Richard Cowper Reed in 1910 as Zacanthoides indicus. It was transferred to the genus Oryctocephalus by the American paleontologist Charles Elmer Resser in 1938.
