= Ovatoryctocara =

Ovatoryctocara Temporal range: Middle Cambrian (Ovatoryctocara zone)

Scientific classification
- Domain: Eukaryota
- Kingdom: Animalia
- Phylum: Arthropoda
- Class: †Trilobita
- Order: †Corynexochida
- Family: †Oryctocephalidae
- Genus: †Ovatoryctocara; Tchernysheva, 1962

Species
- O. ovata (Tchernysheva, 1960) (Type) synonym Oryctocara ovata; O. angusta (Tchernysheva, 1962) synonym Oryctocara angusta; O. angusta angusta; O. angusta snegirevae (Suvorova, 1964) synonym Oryctocara snegirevae; O. doliiformis Korovnikov & Shavanov, 2008; O. granulata (Tchernysheva, 1962) synonyms O. yaxiensis, Oryctocara granulata

Extinct genus of trilobites

Ovatoryctocara is a genus of small corynexochid trilobites from the Cambrian, that lived in what now are Siberia, China, Greenland and Canada (Newfoundland). Ovatoryctocara can be recognised by the combination of the following characters: the central raised area of the cephalon (or glabella) is approximately cylindrical and has two rows of four triangular or round pits. The thorax only has 5 or 6 segments. The tailshield (or pygidium) has an axis (or rhachis) of 6 to 12 rings, the pleural furrows are well developed and the border is absent or narrow as a hair. It is in the subfamily Oryctocarinae.

== Etymology ==
The name of the genus is derived from its type Oryctocara ovata. Ovata refers to its oval overall shape, the Ancient Greek ὀρύκτης (oryctos) means "digger", and the Latin cara is a word for "head" or "face".

== Biostratographic significance ==
The species of the genus Ovatoryctocara occur near the lower limit of the Middle Cambrian in Siberia. The first appearance datum (FAD) of Ovatoryctocara granulata was proposed as the defining marker for the lower limit of the Wuliuan. O. granulata is moderately widespread (East Siberia, South China, Greenland, and Newfoundland).

== Distribution ==
- Ovatoryctocara ovata was found in the early Middle Cambrian of the Russian Federation (Ovatoryctocara granulata zone, Nekekit, Malaya Kuonamka, Olenek, Amyday, and Muna rivers, and into the lower Kounamkites zone, Molodo River, East Siberia).
- Ovatoryctocara angusta angusta is present in the early Middle Cambrian of the Russian Federation (lower part of the Ovatoryctocara granulata zone, Malaya Kuonamka, and Torkukuy rivers, East Siberia).
- Ovatoryctocara angusta snegirevae has been encountered in the early Middle Cambrian of the Russian Federation (Ovatoryctocara granulata zone, Molodo and Malaya Kuonamka Rivers; Amaday Horizon, Maya River, East Siberia).
- Ovatoryctocara doliiformis has been collected from the early Middle Cambrian of the Russian Federation (upper part of the Ovatoryctocara granulata zone, Molodo River, East Siberia)
- Ovatoryctocara granulata occurs in the early Middle Cambrian of the Russian Federation (Ovatoryctocara granulata zone, Nekekit, Malaya Kuonamka, Olenek, Amyday, and Muna rivers, and into the lower Kounamkites zone, Molodo River, East Siberia), China (O. granulata–Bathynotus holopyga zone, late Duyunian, Kaili Formation), latest Lower Cambrian of Greenland (upper Olenellus zone, Henson Glacier Formation) and of Canada (top of the Cephalopyge notabilis zone, Branche Cove Marl Member, Eastern Cove Branche, Newfoundland).

== Description ==
Very small to small trilobite (maximum length approximately 1 centimetre or 0.39 inches) of more or less oval overall shape. The head shield (or cephalon) has natural fracture lines that end at the tip of the genal angle or the rear margin (or it has gonatoparian or proparian facial sutures). The central area of the cephalon (or glabella) is cylindrical or slightly expanded midlength and/or at the frontal lobe. The furrows that show the segmented origin, are most distinct in the form of four sets of rounded or triangular pits, sometimes with a shallow depression between them at the midline. The glabella is almost touching the front of the cephalon (or the pre-glabellar field is short). Narrow eye ridges emerge from the back of the frontal lobe outward and slightly backward (± 20°). Thorax of 5 or 6 segments. Pygidium approximately the same size (isopygous) or larger (macropygous) than the cephalon, with an axis of 6 to 12 rings, and clear pleural furrows. The border is lacking or hair thin. The surface may be smooth or has granules.
