= Ovatoryctocara granulata =

Ovatoryctocara granulata Temporal range: Wuliuan

Scientific classification
- Domain: Eukaryota
- Kingdom: Animalia
- Phylum: Arthropoda
- Class: †Trilobita
- Order: †Corynexochida
- Family: †Oryctocephalidae
- Genus: †Ovatoryctocara
- Species: †O. granulata

Binomial name
- †Ovatoryctocara granulata Tchernysheva, 1962

Extinct species of trilobite

Ovatoryctocara granulata is a species of corynexochid trilobite from the Cambrian. Its first appearance is one of the proposals for the base of Wuliuan (The other proposal having been Oryctocephalus indicus). The species was first formally described by the Russian paleontologist N.Ye. Tchernysheva in 1962.

Ovatoryctocara granulata appears close to the base of the Ovatoryctocara trilobite zone and can be found up to the Kounamkites zone.
