= Nidelric =

Scientific classification
- Kingdom: Animalia
- Order: †Chancelloriida (?)
- Genus: †Nidelric; Hou et al. 2014

Species
- See text

Extinct genus of Cambrian organisms

Nidelric is a Cambrian genus of scleritomous organism, tentatively interpreted as a chancelloriid.

== Species ==
Two species are described in the genus:

- Nidelric gaoloufangensis Zhao et al. 2018
- Nidelric pugio Hou et al. 2014 – type species
