= Obruchevella =

Obruchevella Temporal range: Mesoproterozoic–Cambrian

Scientific classification
- Domain: Bacteria
- Kingdom: Bacillati
- Phylum: Cyanobacteriota
- Genus: †Obruchevella; Reitlinger, 1948

Extinct genus of bacteria

Obruchevella is a helical microfossil known from the Burgess Shale and Cambrian sites in China, as well as later sites dating to as late as the Devonian. It is also known from Owk shales, Vindhyas, Tal Formations, Russia, Greenland, Saudi Arabia, Canada, Alaska and so on.
