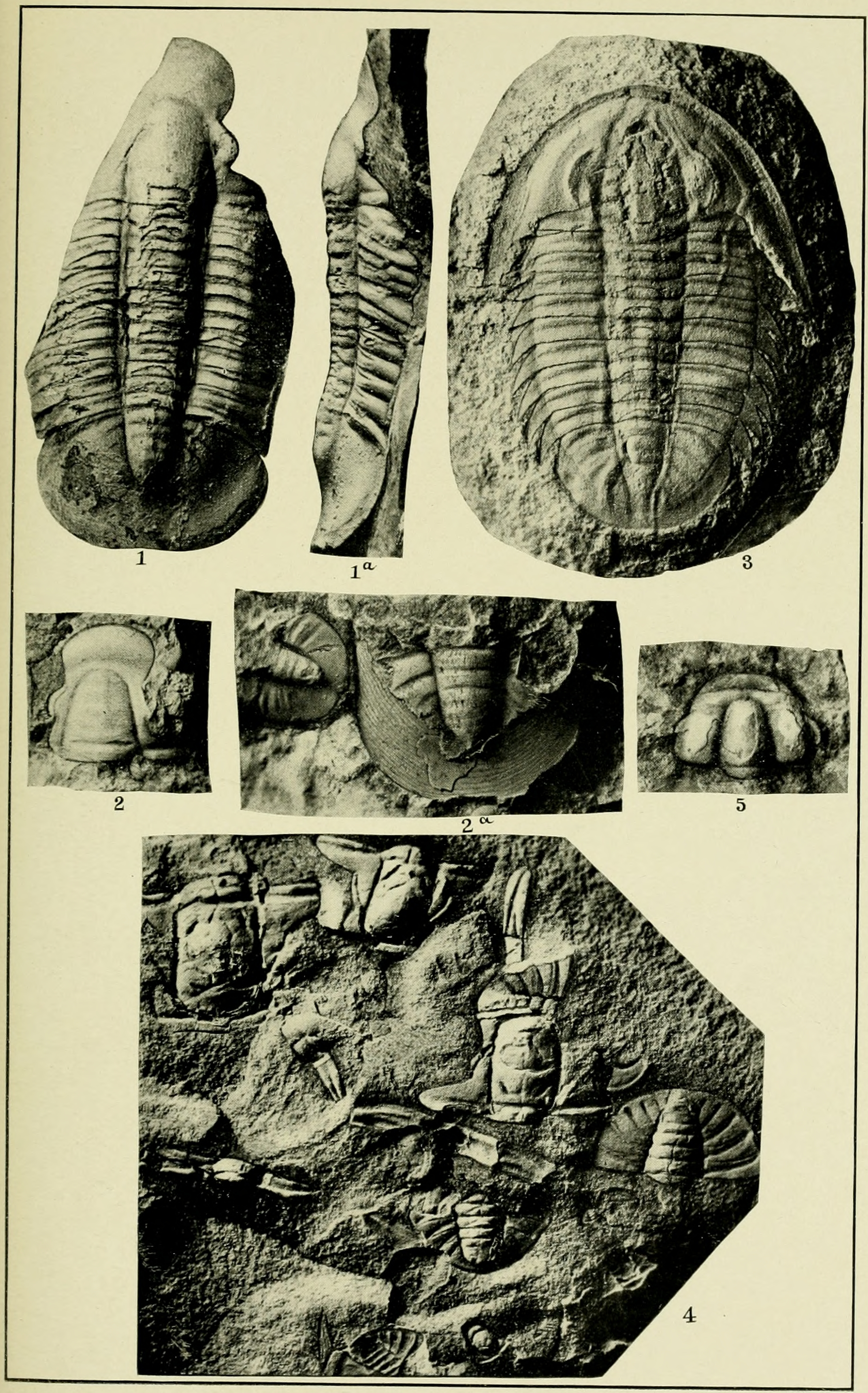

Scientific classification
- Kingdom: Animalia
- Phylum: Arthropoda
- Clade: †Artiopoda
- Class: †Trilobita
- Order: †Corynexochida
- Family: †Dolichometopidae
- Genus: †Bathyuriscus; Meek, 1873

Species
- B. haydeni (type) synonym Bathyurus haydeni; B. adaeus Walcott, 1916; B. balus Walcott, 1916; B. boscaputensis Young & Ludvigsen, 1989; B. brighamensis Resser, 1939; B. concavus Babcock, 1994; B. fimbriatus Robison, 1964; B. formosus Deiss; B. howelli Walcott, 1886 synonym Athabaskia howelli; B. maximus Mason, 1935; B. mendozanus (Rusconi, 1945)) synonyms Plesioparabolina mendozana, Amecephalus mendozanus, A. mendozaensis, Kistocare mendozanum, Parkaspis endecamera; B. ornatus Walcott, 1908; B. petalus Fritz, 1968; B. piedmontensis Resser, 1938; B. punctatus Palmer, 1968; B. rotundatus (Rominger, 1887) synonym Embolimus rotundata; B. saintsmithi Chapman, 1929; B. terranovensis Young & Ludvigsen, 1989; B. wongi Sun, 1935

Synonyms
- Orria; Orriella; Wenkchemnia

= Bathyuriscus =

Bathyuriscus Temporal range: Middle Cambrian

Extinct genus of Cambrian trilobites

Bathyuriscus is an extinct genus of Cambrian trilobite. It was a nektobenthic predatory carnivore. The genus Bathyuriscus is endemic to the shallow seas that surrounded Laurentia. Its major characteristics are a large forward-reaching glabella, pointed pleurae or pleurae with very short spines, and a medium pygidium with well-impressed furrows. Complete specimens have never reached the size of 7 cm predicted by the largest pygidium found. Bathyuriscus is often found with the free cheeks shed, indicating a moulted exoskeleton. An average specimen will in addition have a furrowed glabella, crescent-shaped eyes, be semi-circular in overall body shape, have 7 to 9 thoracic segments, and a length of about 1.5 inches.

== Etymology ==
Bathyuriscus is a variation of Bathyurus, originally based on the Ancient Greek βαθύς (bathys) "deep", oura, "tail", thus, a trilobite with a deep tail.

== Distribution ==
Species belonging to Bathyuriscus have been found in the Marjumian of the United States (New York) and in the Middle Cambrian of Australia, Canada (British Columbia, especially in the Burgess Shale, and Newfoundland), Greenland, Mexico, and the United States (Alaska, Idaho, Montana, Nevada, Pennsylvania, Utah, and Vermont).
