= Zabriskie Quartzite =

Cambrian Period geologic formation in Inyo County, California and Nye County, Nevada

- Stratigraphic range: Lower Cambrian
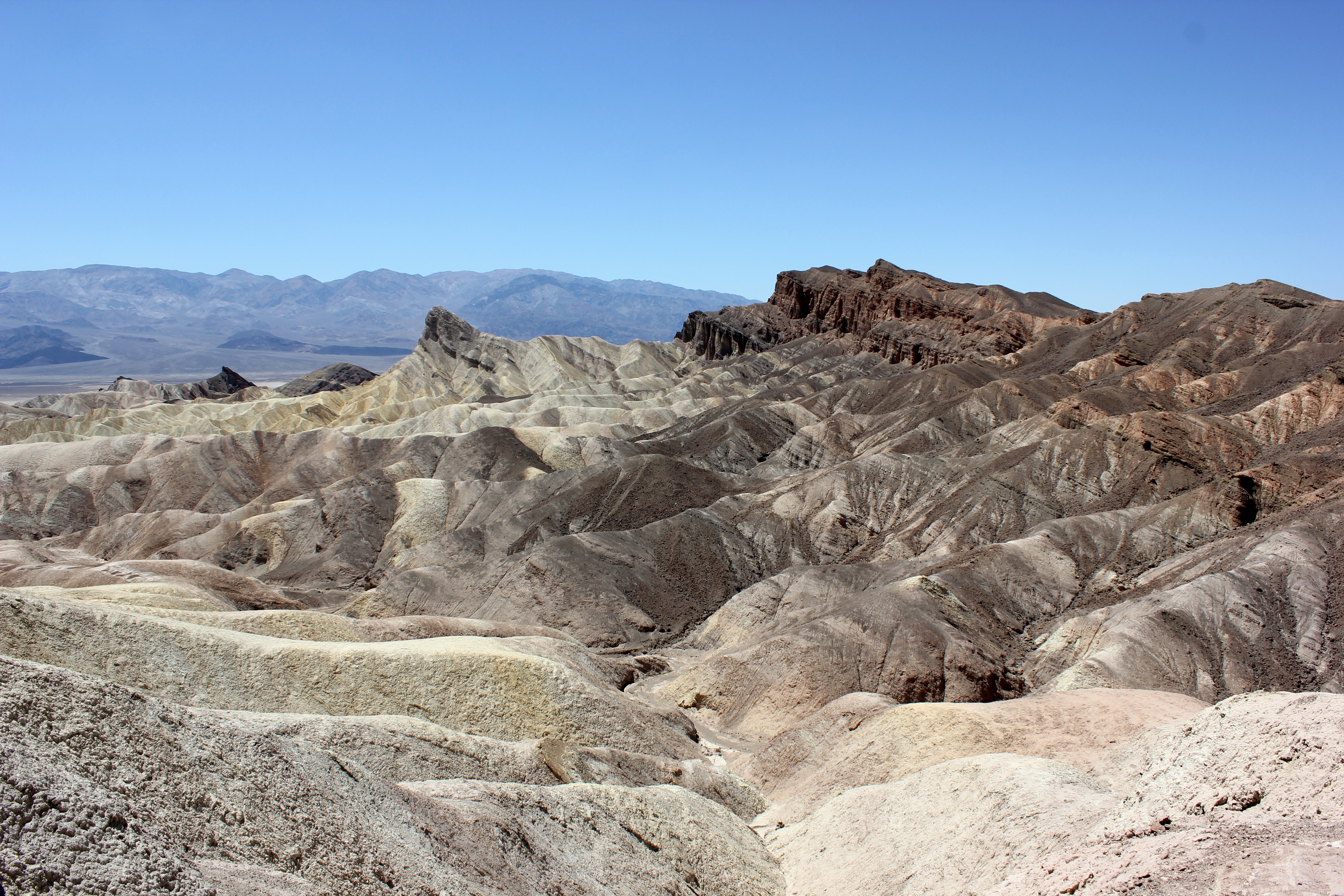
- Zabriskie Point in Death Valley, the locality after which the formation is named.
- Type: Geologic formation
- Sub-units: Resting Springs and Emigrant Pass Member
- Underlies: Carrara Formation
- Overlies: Wood Canyon Formation
- Thickness: 0–2,000 feet (0–610 m)

Lithology
- Primary: Quartzite

Location
- Region: Inyo County, California, Nye County, Nevada
- Country: United States

Type section
- Named for: Zabriskie Point

The Zabriskie Quartzite is a Cambrian Period geologic formation of the northern Mojave Desert, in Inyo County, California and Nye County, Nevada. It is named for its occurrence at Zabriskie Point, located on the eastern slopes of Death Valley in Death Valley National Park.

== Geology ==
The Zabriskie Quartzite, as its name suggests, is predominately composed of pink quartz arenite rocks, which are massive to cross-bedded in nature. It is known to cover an area of 36,000 km^{2} (14,000 sq mi) around the border between California and Nevada. It is overlain by the carbonate-siliciclastic Carrara Formation, whilst it is underlain by the sandstone Wood Canyon Formation.

== Palaeoenvironment ==
The environment of the Zabriskie Quartzite is interpreted to have been that of a tidally influenced nearshore, inferred from the varying symmetrical and combined-wavy ripple marks, mud cracks and raindrop impressions that cover exposed surfaces, alongside the presence of ichnotaxon, such as Skolithos and Monocraterion.

== Paleobiota ==
The Zabriskie Quartzite contains a wealth of ichnotaxon, such as classical Skolithos burrows, as well as discoidal macrofossils which are interpreted to be medusozoan in nature, as such representing the oldest known Phanerozoic medusozoans, but also the oldest known medusozoan stranding.

Color key
| Taxon | Reclassified taxon | Taxon falsely reported as present | Dubious taxon or junior synonym | Ichnotaxon | Ootaxon | Morphotaxon |

Notes
Uncertain or tentative taxa are in small text; ~~crossed out~~ taxa are discredited.

=== Ichnogenera ===
| Genus | Species | Notes | Images |
|---|---|---|---|
| Skolithos | Skolithos sp. | Burrows. | |
| Arenicolites | Arenicolites sp. | Burrows. | |
| Monocraterion | Monocraterion sp. | Burrows. | |
| Planolites | Planolites sp. | Burrows. | |

=== Undescribed ===
| Genus | Species | Notes | Images |
|---|---|---|---|
| Discoidal macrofossils | ??? | 13 Large discoidal macrofossils, which are inferred to be medusozoan in origin. Attaining sizes between 3–21 cm (1.2–8.3 in) in diameter, these may represent the oldest known Phanerozoic medusozoans, as well as the oldest known medusozoan stranding. | |

== See also ==
- Cambrian California
- List of fossiliferous stratigraphic units in California
- Paleontology in California
