= Wuliuan =

Fifth stage of Cambrian and first stage of the Miaolingian

- ~506.5 – ~504.5 Ma

Chronology
| ← / Orsten Fauna; ← / Dresbachian extinction; ← / Burgess Shale; ← / Kaili biota; ← / Archaeocyatha extinction; ← / Emu Bay Shale; ← / Sirius Passet biota; ← / Chengjiang biota; ← / First Trilobites; ← / SSF diversification, first brachiopods & archaeocyatha; ← / First halkieriids, mollusсs, hyoliths SSF; ← / Baykonurian glaciation |
Major glacial period
Subdivision of the Cambrian according to the ICS, as of 2024. Vertical axis scale: Millions of years ago

Etymology
- Name formality: Formal
- Name ratified: June 25, 2018
- Former name(s): Cambrian Stage 5

Usage information
- Celestial body: Earth
- Regional usage: Global (ICS)
- Time scale(s) used: ICS Time Scale

Definition
- Chronological unit: Age
- Stratigraphic unit: Stage
- First proposed by: Zhao et al., 2018
- Time span formality: Formal
- Lower boundary definition: FAD of Oryctocephalus indicus.
- Lower boundary GSSP: Wuliu-Zengjiayan, Guizhou, China; 26.0807°N 108.4138°E
- Lower GSSP ratified: June 25, 2018
- Upper boundary definition: FAD of the Trilobite Ptychagnostus atavus
- Upper boundary GSSP: Drumian section, Wheeler Shale, Utah, U.S.A. 39.5117°N 112.9915°W
- Upper GSSP ratified: 2006

The Wuliuan stage is the fifth stage of the Cambrian, and the first stage of the Miaolingian Series of the Cambrian. It was formally defined by the International Commission on Stratigraphy in 2018. Its base is defined by the first appearance of the trilobite species Oryctocephalus indicus; it ends with the beginning of the Drumian Stage, marked by the first appearance of the trilobite Ptychagnostus atavus around 504.5 million years ago.

The 'golden spike' that formally defines the base of the age is driven into the Wuliu-Zengjiayan (乌溜-曾家崖) section of the Kaili formation, near Balang Village in the Miaoling Mountains, Guizhou, China.

== GSSP ==
Three sections were discussed as GSSP candidates: the Wuliu-Zengjiayan section near Balang in Guizhou province (China), a section on Split Mountain in Nevada (USA) and the "Molodo river section" along the Molodo river (Sakha Republic, Russia). The Wuliu-Zengjiayan section is an outcrop of the Kaili Formation in the Wuliu quarry. The first candidate for the beginning of the Wuliuan was the trilobite Oryctocephalus indicus, the second candidate was the trilobite Ovatoryctocara granulata.

The Wuliu-Zengjiayan section was chosen as the formal base in 2018, with the first appearance of Oryctocephalus indicus being chosen as the defining marker for the GSSP.

== Major events ==
The base of Wuliuan stage (and, accordingly, the entire Miaolingian Series) is characterized by the first major extinction of trilobites, known as the Olenellid Biomere boundary. This event is linked by a sudden negative carbonate carbon excursion.

== Paleontology ==
Benthic graptolites have reached a considerable diversity in the Wuliuan. The most common graptolite genus of this age is Sphenoecium, whose robust colonies were found all over the world. Numerous panarthropods, including trilobites, agnostoids, hurdiids and bradoriids, are known from Wuliuan deposits.
