= Oryctocephalus =

Oryctocephalus Temporal range: Burgess Shale

Scientific classification
- Domain: Eukaryota
- Kingdom: Animalia
- Phylum: Arthropoda
- Class: †Trilobita
- Order: †Corynexochida
- Family: †Oryctocephalidae
- Genus: †Oryctocephalus; Walcott, 1886

Species
- Oryctocephalus burgessensis Resser 1938; Oryctocephalus indicus Reed 1910; Oryctocephalus matthewi Rasetti 1951; Oryctocephalus reynoldsi Reed 1899; Oryctocephalus reticulatus Lermontova 1940

Extinct genus of trilobites

Oryctocephalus is a genus of trilobites known from the Middle Cambrian Burgess Shale. 24 specimens of Oryctocephalus are known from the Greater Phyllopod bed, where they comprise 0.42% of the community. This small- to medium-sized trilobite's major characteristics are prominent eye ridges, pleural spines, long genal spines, spines on the pygidium, and notably four furrows connecting pairs of pits on its glabella. Juvenile specimens have been found with only 5 or 6 thoracic segments and about one eighth of adult size, as well as about 2 mm wide.
