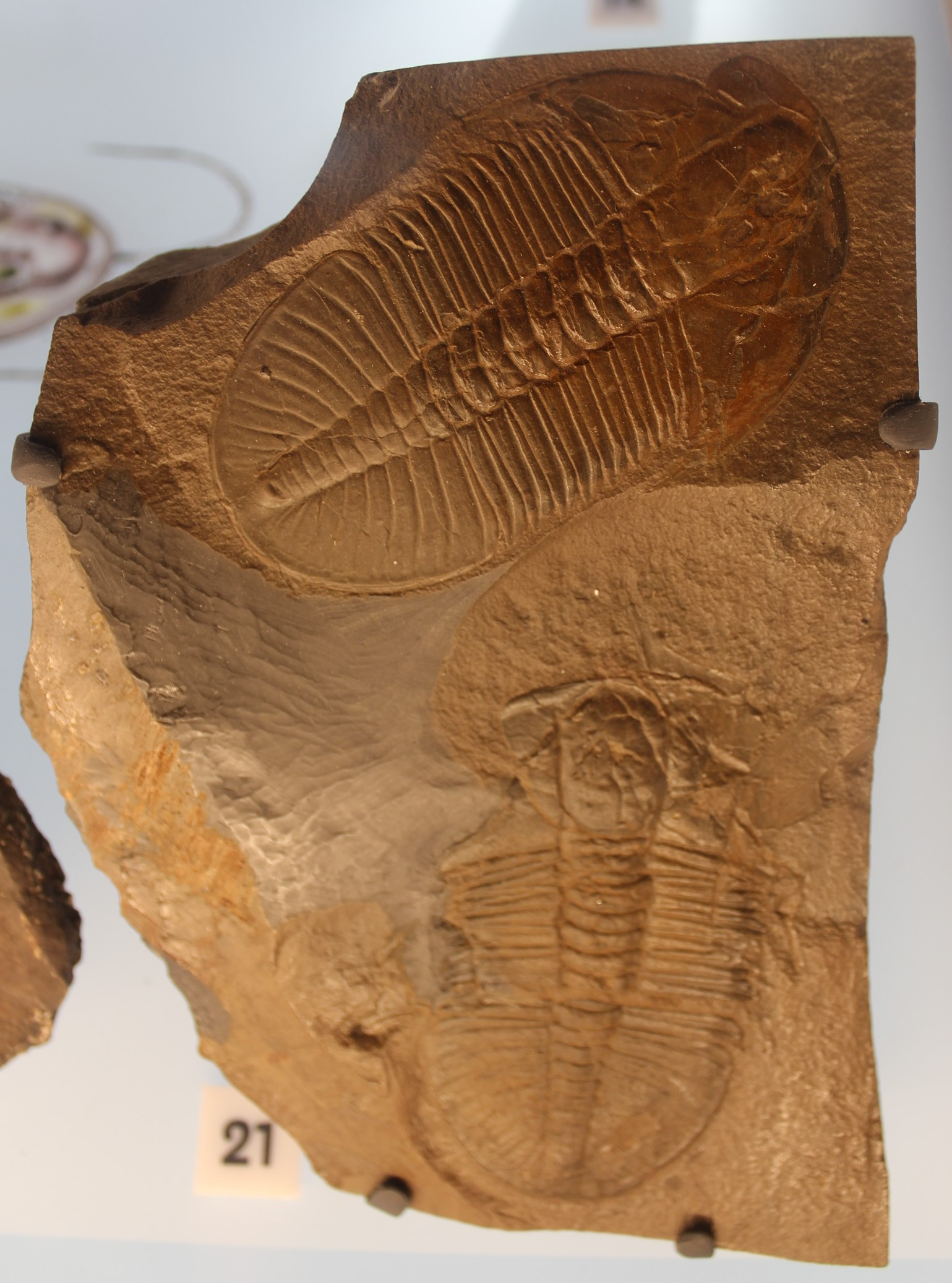
- Ogygopsis klotzi

Scientific classification
- Domain: Eukaryota
- Kingdom: Animalia
- Phylum: Arthropoda
- Class: †Trilobita
- Order: †Corynexochida
- Family: †Dorypygidae
- Genus: †Ogygopsis; Walcott, 1889

= Ogygopsis =

Ogygopsis Temporal range: Cambrian

Genus of trilobites

Ogygopsis is a genus of trilobite from the Cambrian of Antarctica and North America, specifically the Burgess Shale. It is the most common fossil in the Mt. Stephen fossil beds there, but rare in other Cambrian faunas. Its major characteristics are a prominent glabella with eye ridges, lack of pleural spines, a large spineless pygidium about as long as the thorax or cephalon, and its length: up to 12 cm.

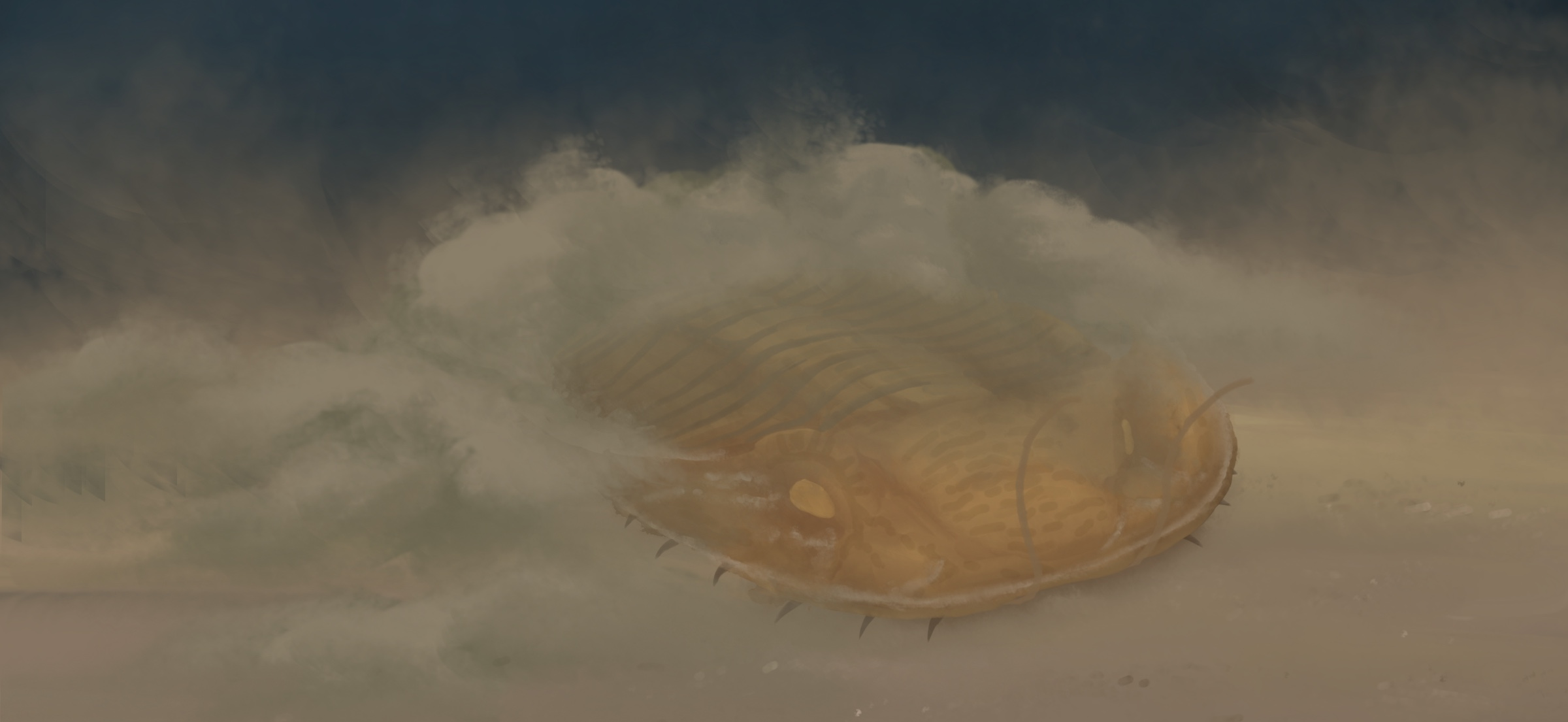
Reconstruction of Ogygopsis klotzi in the Burgess Shale

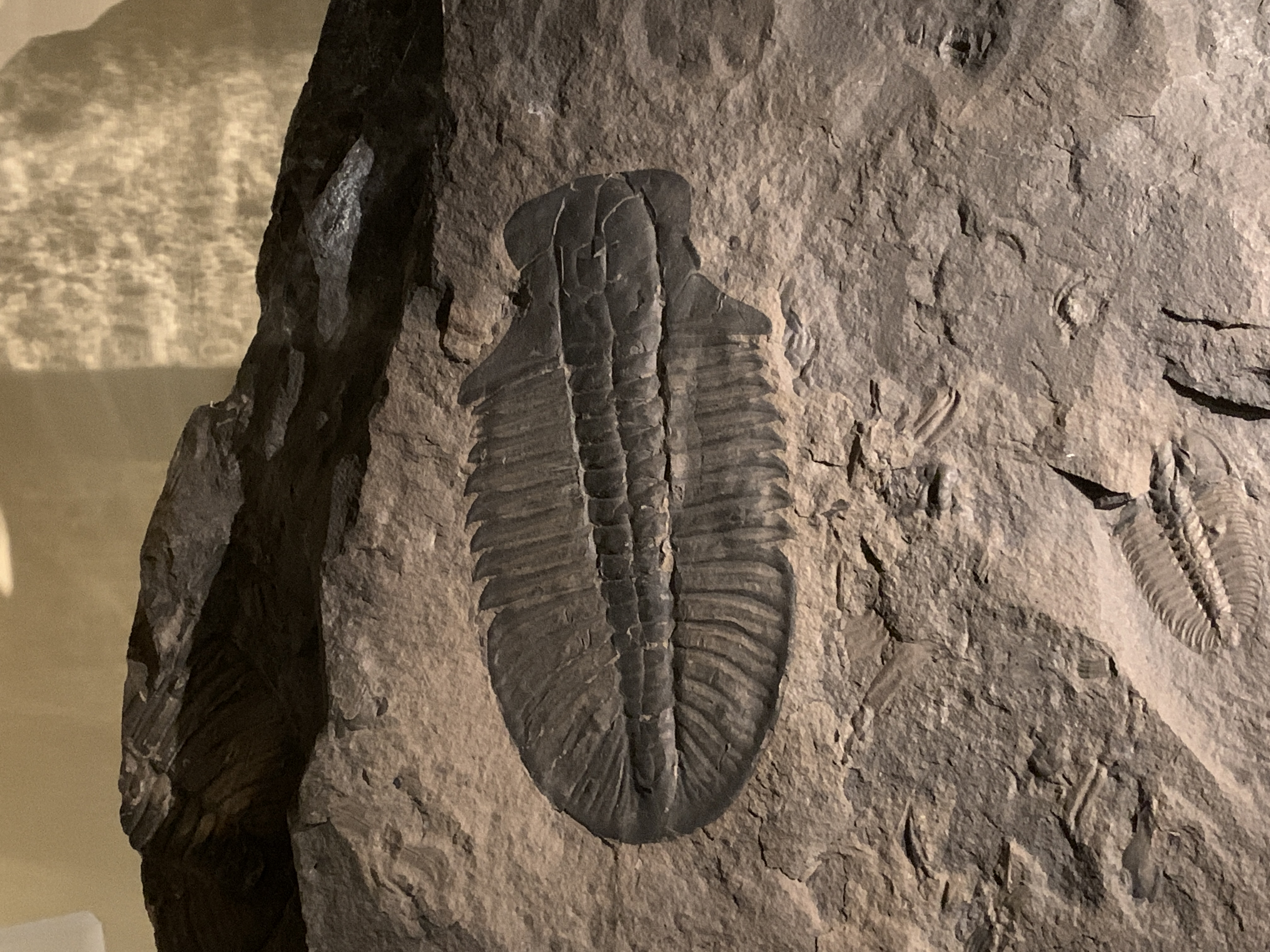
At the Royal Tyrrell Museum of Palaeontology
