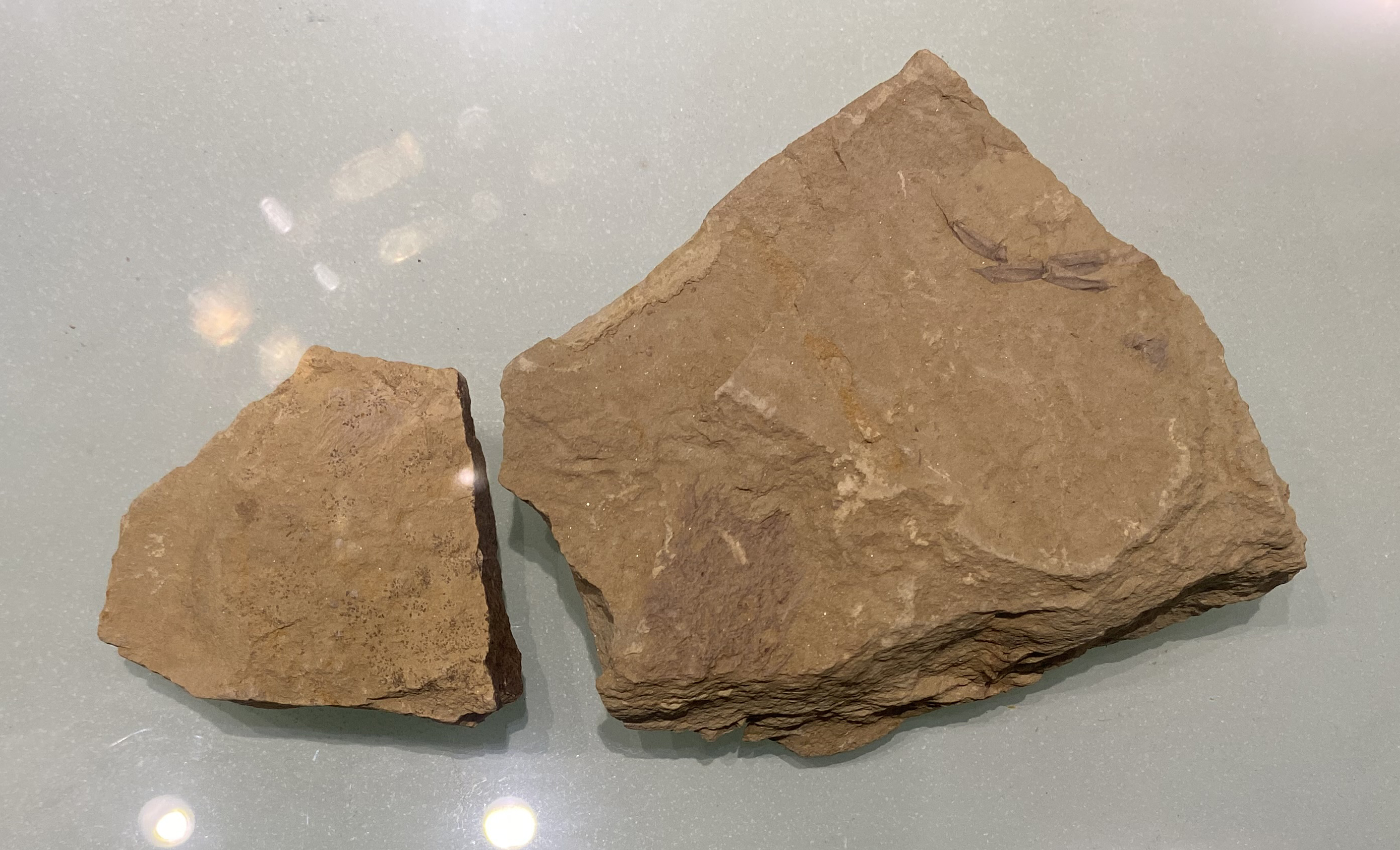
- Fossil of Allonnia phrixothrix in Yuxi Museum

Scientific classification
- Kingdom: Animalia
- Order: †Chancelloriida
- Family: †Chancelloriidae
- Genus: †Allonnia; Doré and Reid, 1965

Type species
- Allonnia tripodophora Doré and Reid, 1965

Species
- A. erjiensis Yun, Zhang & Li, 2017; A. erromenosa Jiang, in Luo et al. 1982; A. nuda Cong et al., 2018; A. phrixothrix Bengtson & Hou 2001; A. tetrathallus Jiang, 1982; A. tenuis Zhao et al. 2018; A. quadrocornuformis (Ding & Li, 1992) in Ding et al. (1992); A. rossica (Sayutina, in Vasil'eva & Sayutina 1988); A. tetrathallis (Jiang, in Luo et al. 1982); A. tripodophora Doré and Reid, 1965

= Allonnia =

Allonnia Temporal range: Cambrian Stage 2–Middle Cambrian

Extinct genus of Cambrian animals

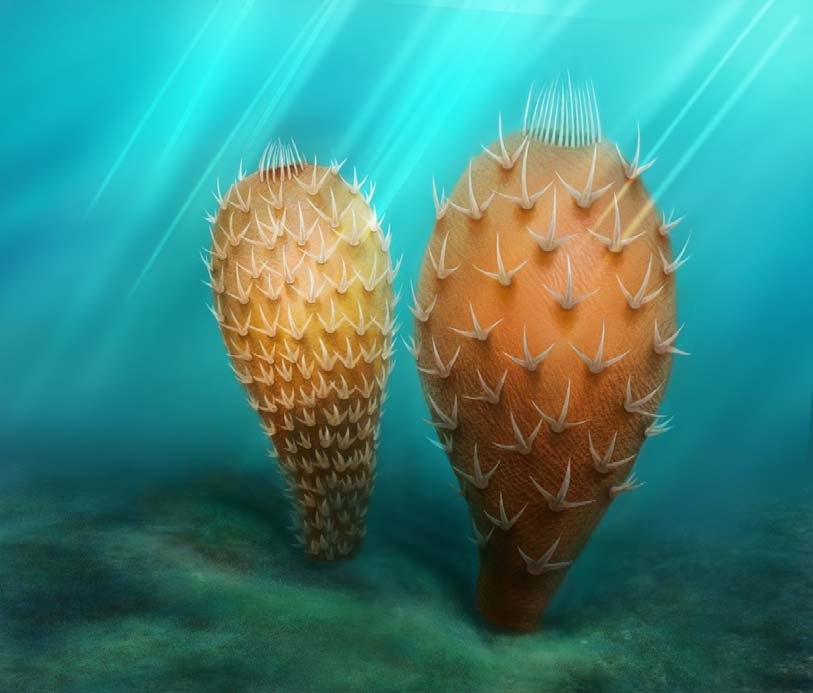
Reconstruction of A. erjiensis (left) and A. phrixothrix (right) from the Chengjiang biota

Allonnia is a genus of coeloscleritophoran known as complete scleritomes from the Middle Cambrian Burgess Shale. It is also a constituent of the small shelly fauna.

Its earliest occurrence in Yunnan dates to the Upper Meishucunian (~ Tommotian / Cambrian Stage 2)
