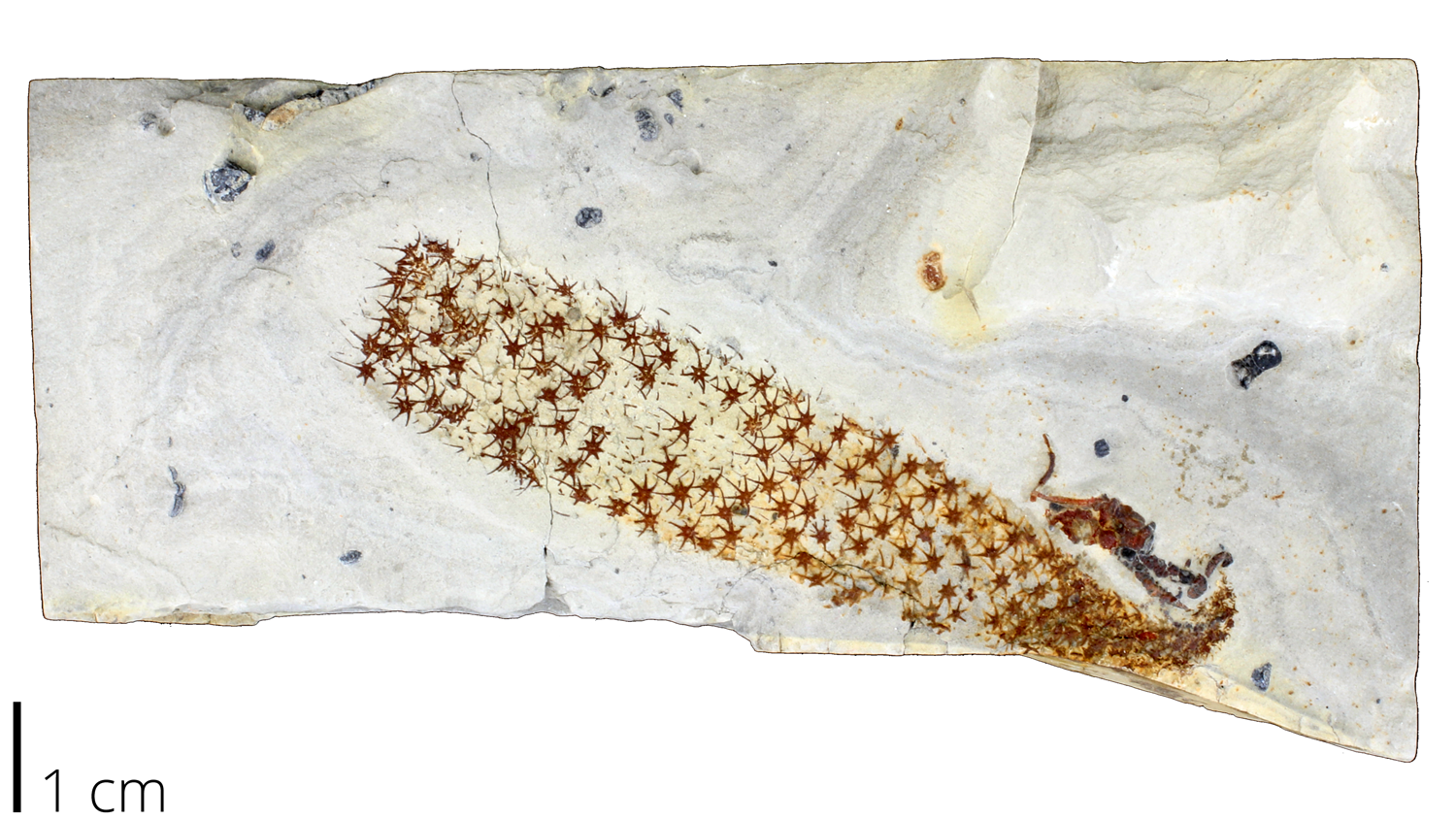
- Fossil Chancelloria pentacta displayed at the Paleontological Research Institution, NY

Scientific classification
- Kingdom: Animalia
- Order: †Chancelloriida
- Family: †Chancelloriidae
- Genus: †Chancelloria; Walcott, 1920

Species
- C. eros Walcott, 1920 (type); C. drusilla Walcott, 1920; C. libo Walcott, 1920; C. yorkensis Walcott, 1920; C. cruceana Rusconi, 1954; C. lenaica Zhuravleva and Korde, 1955; C. altaica Romanenko, 1968; C. maroccana Sdzuy, 1969; C. iranica Mostler and Mosleh-Yazdi, 1976; C. pentacta Rigby, 1978; C. arida Duan, 1984; C. odontodes Duan, 1984; C. coronacea Vassiljeva, 1985; C. spinulosa Vassiljeva, 1985; C. symmetrica Vassiljeva, 1985; C. primaria Missarzhevsky, 1989; C. racemifundis Bengtson, 1990; C. obliqua Gravestock et al., 2001; C. australilonga Yun et al., 2019; C. impar Moore et al., 2019; C. lilioides Moore et al., 2019; C. zhaoi Peng et al., 2023

= Chancelloria =

Chancelloria Temporal range: Cambrian

Extinct genus of Cambrian animals

Chancelloria is a genus of early animals known from the Middle Cambrian Burgess Shale, the Comley limestone, the Wheeler Shale, the Bright Angel Shale and elsewhere (such as Iran). It is named after Chancellor Peak. It was first described in 1920 by Charles Doolittle Walcott, who regarded them as one of the most primitive groups of sponges. However, they are currently thought to be member of the group Chancelloriidae. 178 specimens of Chancelloria are known from the Greater Phyllopod bed, where they comprise 0.34% of the community.
