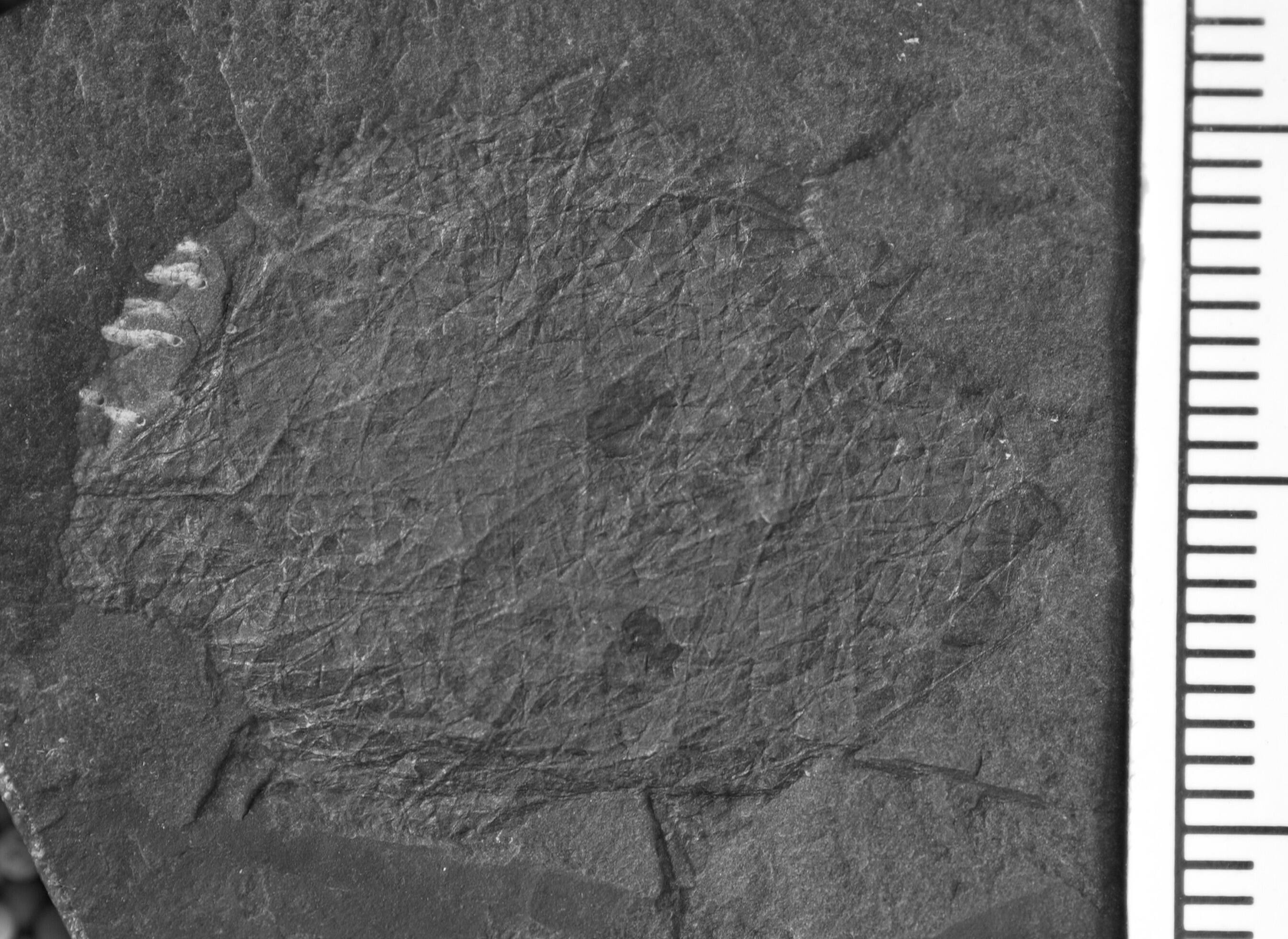
- Fossil of E. globosa

Scientific classification
- Kingdom: Animalia
- Phylum: Porifera
- Informal group: †Heteractinida
- Family: †Eiffeliidae
- Genus: †Eiffelia; Walcott, 1920

Type species
- †Eiffelia globosa Walcott, 1920

Species
- †Eiffelia araniformis (Missarzhevsky in Missarzhevsky & Mambetov, 1981); †Eiffelia globosa Walcott, 1920

Synonyms
- Lenastella Missarzhevsky in Missarzhevsky & Mambetov, 1981; Actinoites Duan, 1984; Niphadus Duan, 1984; Eiffelia araniformis synonymy: Lenastella araniformis Missarzhevsky in Missarzhevsky & Mambetov, 1981; Lenastella aculeata Missarzhevsky in Missarzhevsky & Mambetov, 1981; Lenastella mucronata Missarzhevsky in Missarzhevsky & Mambetov, 1981; Lenastella umbonata Missarzhevsky in Missarzhevsky & Mambetov, 1981; Actinoites universalis Duan, 1984; Actinoites simplex Duan, 1984; Niphadus xihaopingensis Duan, 1984; Niphadus complanatus Duan, 1984

= Eiffelia =

Eiffelia Temporal range: Early Cambrian–Burgess Shale

Extinct genus of sponges

Eiffelia is an extinct genus of sponges known from the Middle Cambrian Burgess Shale as well as several Early Cambrian small shelly fossil deposits. It is named after Eiffel Peak, which was itself named after the Eiffel Tower. It was first described in 1920 by Charles Doolittle Walcott. It belongs in the Hexactinellid stem group. 60 specimens of Eiffelia are known from the Greater Phyllopod bed, where they comprise 0.11% of the community.

Eiffelia generally have star-shaped six-rayed spicules, with rays diverging at 60°, occasionally with a seventh ray perpendicular to the other six.

== Species ==
Two species are known:

- †Eiffelia globosa Walcott, 1920: This species is known from the Middle Cambrian Burgess Shale. In life, it had a globe-like shape and was up to 6 cm in diameter.
- †Eiffelia araniformis (Missarzhevsky in Missarzhevsky & Mambetov, 1981): This species is known from several Early Cambrian small shelly fossil deposits in the Siberian Platform, Mongolia, China, Europe, and Australia. It was originally described in the genus Lenastella. It was moved to Eiffelia by Bengtson et al. (1990).
