= Korovinellidae =

Korovinellidae Temporal range: Early Cambrian

Scientific classification
- Kingdom: Animalia
- Phylum: Porifera
- Clade: †Archaeocyatha
- Order: †Kazachstanicyathida
- Suborder: †Kazachstanicyathina
- Family: †Korovinellidae; Khalfina 1960

Type genus
- Korovinella Khalfina 1960

Genera
- †Bicoscinus Debrenne 1977; †Korovinella Khalfina 1960

Extinct family of sponges

Korovinellidae is a prehistoric family of sponges in the suborder Kazachstanicyathina. It was described in 1960 with type genus Korovinella. Korovinellidae is known from the Early Cambrian.
