= Astraeospongium =

Astraeospongium Temporal range: Silurian–Devonian

Scientific classification
- Domain: Eukaryota
- Kingdom: Animalia
- Phylum: Porifera
- Class: Calcarea
- Family: †Astraeospongiidae
- Genus: †Astraeospongium; Roemer, 1854

Type species
- Blumenbachium meniscum Roemer, 1848

Species
- A. meniscum Roemer, 1848; A. patina Roemer, 1861

Synonyms
- Acanthospongia Roemer, 1860

Extinct genus of sponges

Astraeospongium is a genus of calcareous sponge from the Silurian. Known species include A. meniscum and A. patina.

== Taxonomy ==
The type species of Astraeospongium, A. meniscum, was named by German geologist Ferdinand von Roemer in 1848, and was originally assigned to the bryozoan genus Blumenbachium. In a later publication, Roemer reassigned it to its own genus, Astraeospongium; twelve years later, though, he apparently renamed it to Astraeospongia meniscus. There is no evidence of any argument or intention to change its binomial name, and such a change would be invalid. Thus, Astraeospongium meniscum is the correct binomial name for the type species. Additional species have been named over the years, including A. patina and A. lancifer; the latter has been reassigned to Gondekia, which belongs to Eiffeliidae.

== Description ==
Astraeospongium as a genus is bowl shaped, with a skeleton composed of star-shaped octatin spicules. Most specimens range from 3.5–5 cm (1.4–2.0 in) though may range from 3–9 cm (1.2–3.5 in). In A. meniscum, spicules are 6–7 mm (0.24–0.28 in), though in A. patina, they are only 1 mm (0.039 in). The youngest spicules are found at the upper surface, particularly close to the rim, and are fairly easily distinguished. About 1–2 mm (0.039–0.079 in) from the base, they begin to recrystalise and are cemented together. In the middle, they fuse into a massive, calcareous basal skeleton that lacks open spaces or channels. It has inferred that soft tissues only occupied the uppermost part of the basal skeleton.
