= Eiffelospongia =

Eiffelospongia Temporal range: Burgess Shale

Scientific classification
- Kingdom: Animalia
- Phylum: Porifera
- Informal group: †Heteractinida
- Family: †Eiffeliidae
- Genus: †Eiffelospongia; Rigby & Collins, 2004
- Species: †E. hirsuta

Binomial name
- †Eiffelospongia hirsuta Rigby & Collins, 2004

Extinct genus of sponges

Eiffelospongia is a genus of sponge known from the Mount Stephen Trilobite Beds.
