= Rosnaiella =

Rosnaiella Temporal range: Cambrian

Scientific classification
- Domain: Eukaryota
- Kingdom: Animalia
- Phylum: Porifera
- Clade: †Archaeocyatha
- Genus: †Rosnaiella; F. Doré, 1969

Extinct genus of Cambrian organisms

Rosnaiella is a genus of Cambrian archaeocyaths known from Normandy (and elsewhere?).

== Species ==
- †Rosnaiella brevis
- †Rosnaiella dangeardi F. Doré, 1969
