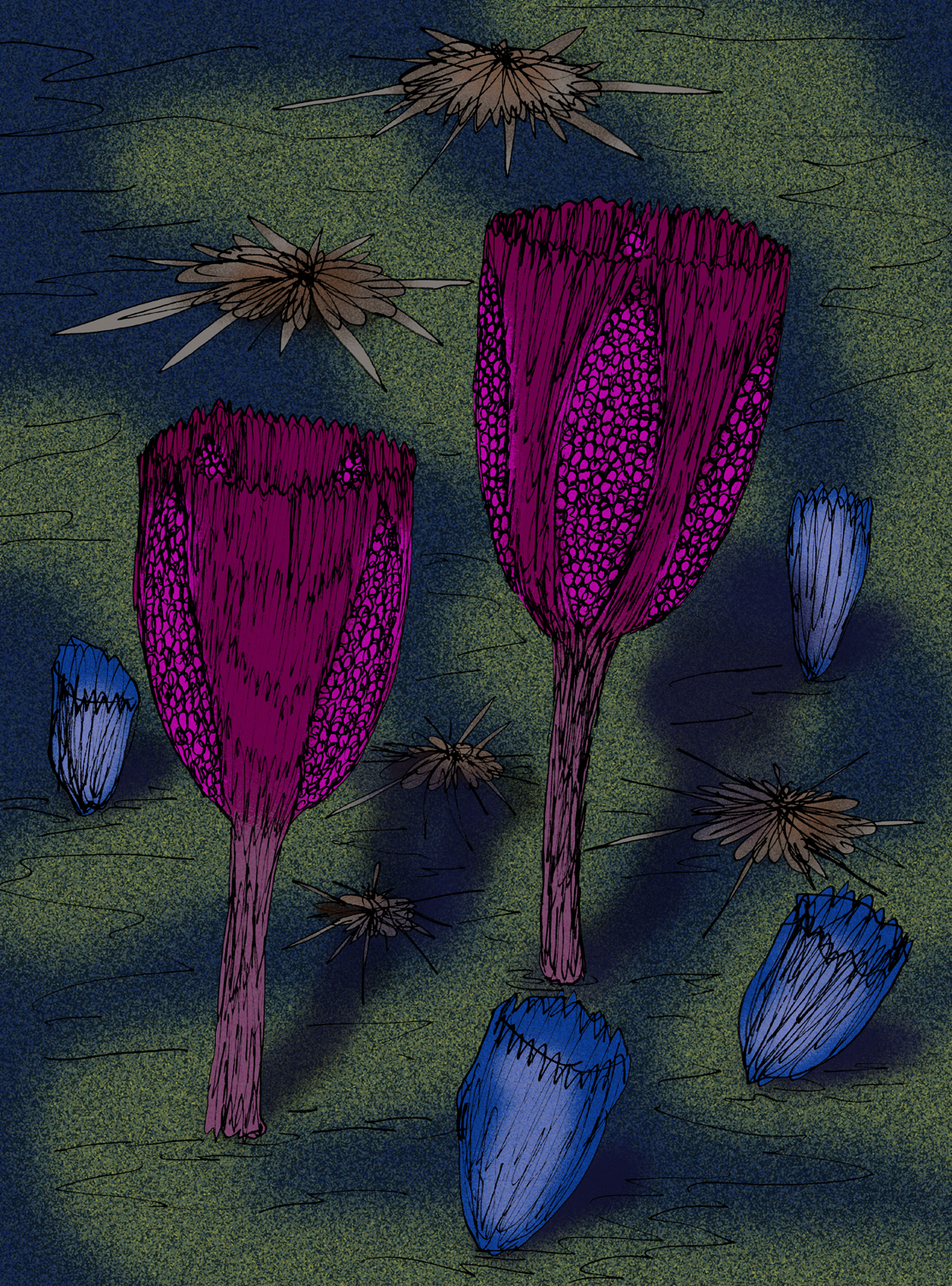
- Artist's reconstruction

Scientific classification
- Domain: Eukaryota
- Kingdom: Animalia
- Phylum: Porifera
- Informal group: †"Heteractinida"
- Family: †Eiffeliidae
- Genus: †Petaloptyon; Raymond, 1931
- Species: †P. danei

Binomial name
- †Petaloptyon danei Raymond, 1931

Synonyms
- Canistrumella alternata Rigby, 1986

= Petaloptyon =

Petaloptyon Temporal range: Burgess Shale

Extinct genus of sponges

Petaloptyon danei is a goblet-shaped hexactinellid sponge known from rare fragments from the Middle Cambrian Burgess Shale. A few specimens of Petaloptyon are known from the Greater Phyllopod bed, where they comprise under 0.01% of the community.

The fragments show the living animal had a stalk, and had panels with a lattice pattern.
