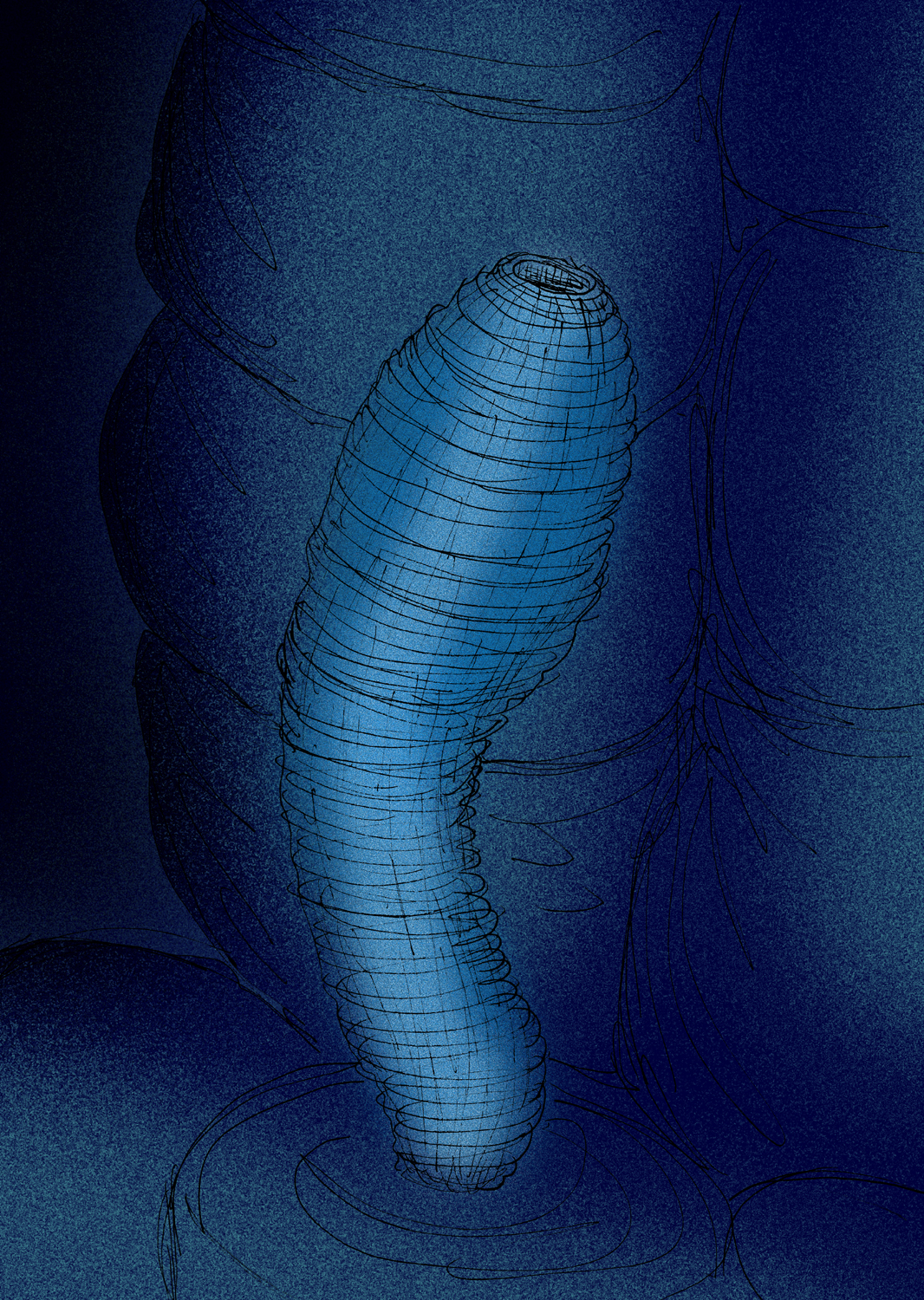
- Restoration of Dubius uncatus

Scientific classification
- Kingdom: Animalia
- Phylum: Porifera (?)
- Class: †Cribricyatha; Vologdin, 1961

= Cribricyatha =

Cribricyatha Temporal range: early–mid Cambrian (Tommotian 2 – Botomian 3)

Class of sponges

Cribricyatha is an extinct class of sponge-like animals which lived in the early to mid-Cambrian Period (Tommotian to Botomian).

== Description ==
Cribricyatha were cup-shaped filter feeders similar to archaeocyathan sponges, with a skeleton composed of magnesium-rich calcite microgranules. The base is narrow, broadening upwards into a solid conical or semi-conical shell. In horizontal cross-section, the cup may be circular, elliptical, cardioid (heart-shaped), or quadrate (square-shaped).

All cribricyaths can be characterized by a series of peripterates, ribbon-like crests ringing around the outer surface of the shell. In cribricyaths of the order Cribricyathida, the peripterates may be supplemented by baculi, low ridges running parallel to the main shaft of the shell. Internally, the shell is hollow. Members of the superfamilies Pyxidocyathoidea and Akademiophylloidea have a smaller enclosed layer nested within the shell: the inner wall. When present, the inner wall is fused on one edge to the inner surface of the outer wall. The inner wall is porous and may have its own series of looping crests, known as striae. The cup develops from the outside-in, with the inner wall deposited after the outer wall.

== Ecology ==
Cribricyaths coexisted for some time with their archeocyathan relatives, but they were generally much smaller, with a maximum height of only 2 cm (0.8 inches) and a maximum diameter of only 2 mm. They were probably reef cryptobionts, meaning that they inhabited sheltered areas (such as the small crevices under or between rocks and reef-building organisms). Cribricyaths were endemic to a marine region equivalent to modern North Asia and Mongolia. Cribricyaths were usually subordinate to archaeocyathans as reef-building organisms, though they managed to be diverse or voluminous contributors for a few reef systems.

== Taxonomy ==
From the Treatise on Invertebrate Paleontology (Part E revised, Volumes 4–5, 2015):

- Class Cribricyatha Vologdin, 1961
  - Order Cribricyathida Vologdin, 1961
    - Superfamily Conoidocyathoidea Vologdin, 1964
      - Family Conoidocyathidae Vologdin, 1964
        - Conoidocyathus Vologdin, 1964 [Atdabanian 1 – Botomian 3]
    - Superfamily Pyxidocyathoidea Vologdin, 1964
      - Family Pyxidocyathidae Vologdin, 1964
        - Dolichocyathus Vologdin, 1964 [Botomian 1 – 3]
        - Lucyathus Vologdin, 1957 [Atdabanian 1 – Botomian 3]
        - Szecyathus Vologdin, 1957 [Atdabanian 2 – Botomian 3]
  - Order Vologdinophyllida Radugin, 1964
    - Superfamily Vologdinophylloidea Radugin, 1964
      - Family Leibaellidae Jankauskas, 1965
        - Dubius Jankauskas, 1969 [Tommotian 3 – Botomian 1]
        - Leibaella Jankauskas, 1964 [Tommotian 4 – Atdabanian 3]
        - Ramifer Jankauskas, 1969 [Tommotian 2 – Atdabanian 4]
      - Family Vologdinophyllidae Radugin, 1964
        - Manaella Jankauskas, 1964 [Atdabanian 1]
        - Vologdinophyllum Radugin, 1962 [Atdabanian 1]
    - Superfamily Akademiophylloidea Radugin, 1964
      - Family Akademiophyllidae Radugin, 1964
        - Akademiophyllum Radugin, 1964 [Atdabanian 1 – Botomian 1]
        - Eriphyllum Radugin, 1966 [Atdabanian 1]
      - Family Striatocyathidae Vologdin & Jankauskas, 1968
        - Achorocyathus Jankauskas, 1969 [Atdabanian 1 – 3]
        - Rarocyathus Vologdin & Jankauskas, 1968 [Atdabanian 3 – Botomian 1]
        - Striatocyathus Vologdin & Jankauskas, 1968 [Atdabanian 1 – Botomian 1]
