= Arimasia =

Arimasia Temporal range: late Ediacaran ~543–539 Ma
- Reconstruction of Arimasia germsi.

Scientific classification
- Kingdom: Animalia
- Phylum: Porifera
- Clade: †Archaeocyatha
- Genus: †Arimasia; Runnegar et al., 2024
- Species: †A. germsi

Binomial name
- †Arimasia germsi Runnegar et al., 2024

Genus of possible Ediacaran archaeocyathan

Arimasia is an extinct genus of sponge from the late Ediacaran of Namibia, with possible affinities to the Archaeocyatha. It is a monotypic genus, containing only Arimasia germsi. Estimated to be around 543 million years old, A. germsi has been identified as possibly being the oldest known archaeocyathan to date.

== Discovery and naming ==
The fossil material of Arimasia was found from the Huns Member of the Urusis Formation, in the Schwarzrand Subgroup of the wider Nama Group of Namibia during the years of 1993, 1995 and 1996, and were formally described and named in 2024.

The generic name Arimasia is derived from the place name "Arimas farm", the type locality from which the fossil material was first found. The specific name germsi is in honour of Gerard J.B. Germs, in celebration of the 50th anniversary of his PhD dissertation on The stratigraphy and paleontology of the lower Nama Group, South West Africa.

== Description ==
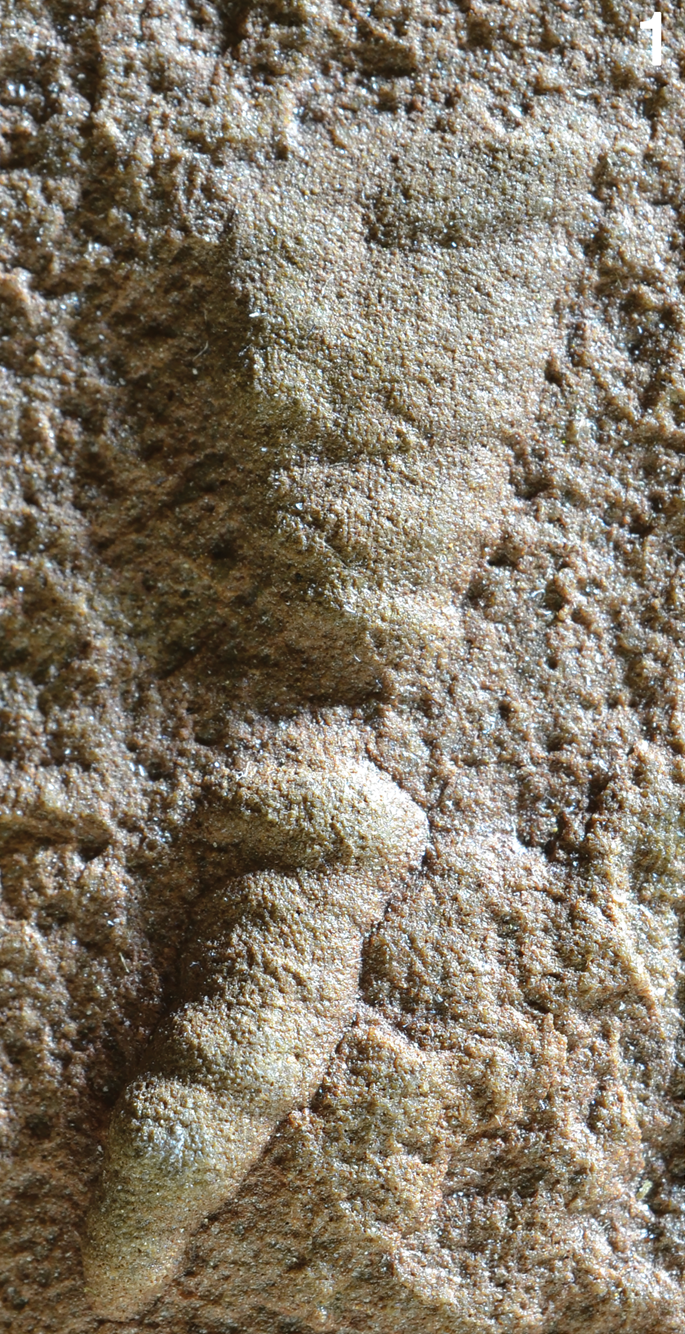
The holotype fossil of Arimasia germsi.

Arimasia germsi is a conical-shaped fossil, measured at 2 cm (0.79 in) in length. The based of the cone is sealed, and bears eight irregular, co-marginal rugae, whilst the top of the cone was likely open in life, being flattened during burial. The main body of the cone itself is granular in appearance, forming a mesh-like structure. Whilst is it noted to be difficult to resolve this mesh in the holotype, a paratype was found with a better preserved mesh, revealing that the cells roughly 200–300 μm (0.0079–0.0118 in) a part, and are packed together in a honeycomb-like arrangement.

== Affinities ==
Arimasia germsi is possibly the earliest known archaeocyathan sponge, and the only one to be found in the Ediacaran, with possible relations to the Monocyathida, partially sharing certain features seen in the clade, although missing a couple of key details. Alongside this, Arimasia has also been noted to pass the criteria for being classified as a sponge as set out by Antcliffe et al., with the meshed body being similar to that of Archaeolynthus contractus, but does not feature the mineralised bodies that all sponges have. As such, it has been suggested that Arimasia is a unmineralised, single-walled archaeocyathan, perhaps even a stem-group demosponge, along with possibly being related to vauxiid sponges, which are known to have unmineralised bodies. It has also been noted that with the discovery of Arimasia, it could lend credence to the idea that it, alongside the Archaeocyatha and unmineralised vauxiids, may have been aspiculate stem members of the Demospongiae.

== Palaeoecology ==
Some specimens on a particular slab are noted to be preferentially oriented in a certain direction, suggesting that Arimasia may have been tethered to the substrate in life.

== See also ==
- List of Ediacaran genera
