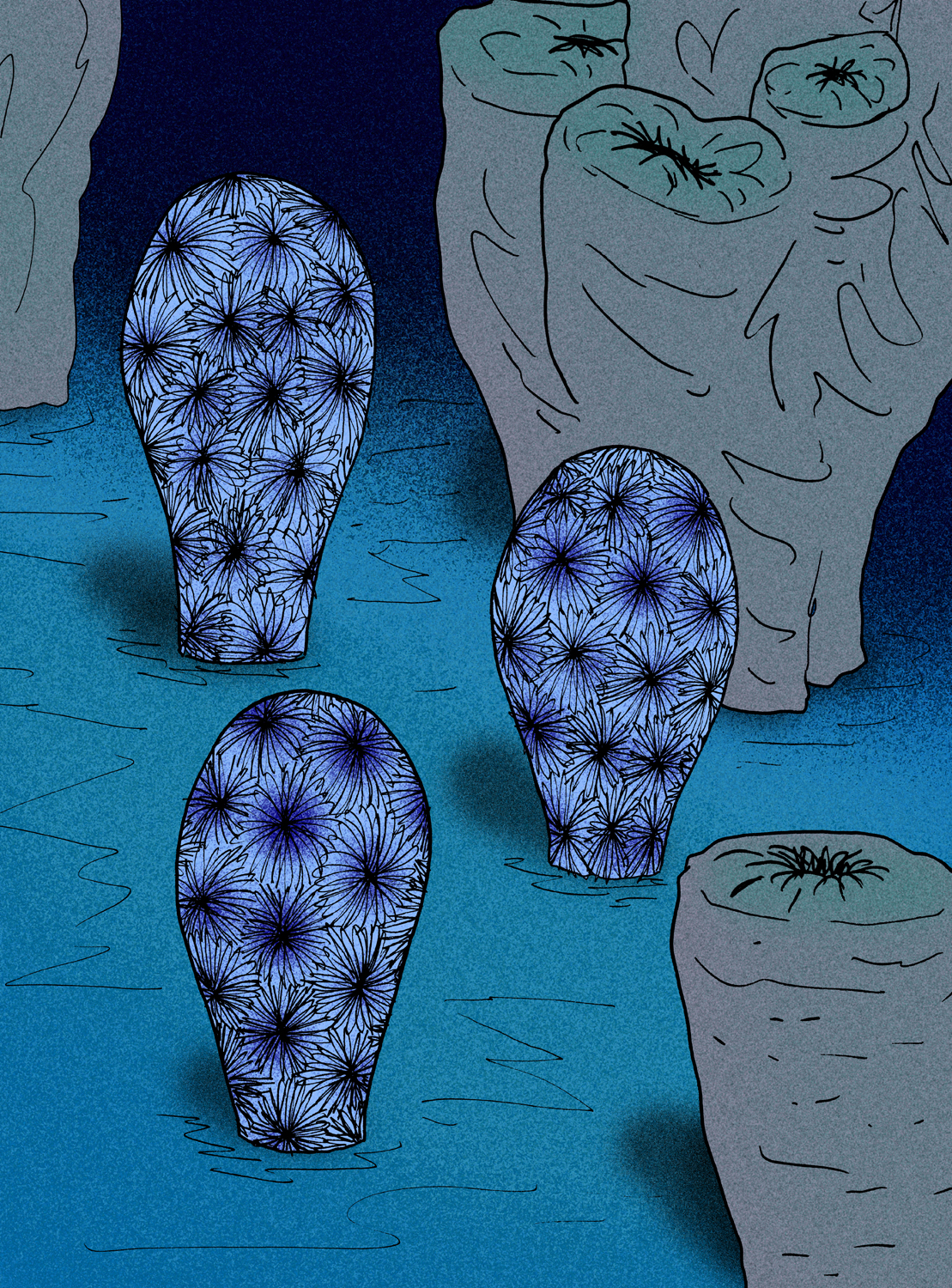
- Restoration of Radiocyathus minor

Scientific classification
- Kingdom: Animalia
- Phylum: Porifera (?)
- Class: †Radiocyatha; Debrenne et al., 1970

= Radiocyatha =

Radiocyatha Temporal range: early–mid Cambrian (Tommotian 3 – Toyonian 2)

Class of sponge-like animals

Radiocyatha is an extinct group of sponge-like animals which lived in the early to mid-Cambrian Period (Tommotian to Toyonian).

== Details ==
They were very similar to archaeocyath sponges, with a cup-shaped calcareous body up to 20 cm (7.9 inches) in height. One major difference is that the radiocyath skeleton is not composed of tiny calcite grains, but rather large aragonite plates, known as nesasters. Nesasters are star-shaped, with up to 20 radiating spokes in a flat plane. The outer wall of the cup has radial rods directed inwards. Uranosphaera is a simple single-walled radiocyath, while the hetairacyathids bear an additional nested wall layer, akin to archaeocyaths.

Radiocyaths reached their maximum abundance in the Atdabanian and Botomian, contributing towards the biomass of archaeocyath sponge reefs in regions such as Mongolia and Australia. Sponge affinities for radiocyaths are plausible but uncertain; the snowflake-shaped spicules of heteractinid sponges show some similarity to nesasters. Radiocyaths have been compared to the enigmatic receptaculitids, which also have calcareous plates and radiating rod-like structures. Radiocyatha is tentatively ranked as a class.

== Subgroups ==
- Acanthinocyathida
  - Acanthinocyathus
  - Osadchiites
- Soanitidae
  - Calathium
- Uranosphaeridae
  - Uranosphaera Bedford & Bedford, 1936 [Botomian 1 – 3]
- Order Hetairacyathida / Family Hetairacyathidae Bedford & Bedford, 1937
  - Blastasteria Debrenne et al., 1971 [Botomian 3]
  - Radiocyathus Okulitch, 1937 [Atdabanian 4 – Botomian 3]
  - Girphanovella Zhuravleva, 1967 [Atdabanian 1 – Toyonian 2]
  - Gonamispongia Korshunov, 1968 [Tommotian 3 – Atdabanian 1]
