= Kazachstanicyathida =

Kazachstanicyathida Temporal range: Early Cambrian

Scientific classification
- Kingdom: Animalia
- Phylum: Porifera
- Clade: †Archaeocyatha
- Order: †Kazachstanicyathida; Konyushkov 1967

Suborders
- †Altaicyathina Debrenne 1991; †Kazachstanicyathina Konyushkov 1967

Extinct order of sponges

Kazachstanicyathida is a prehistoric order of sponges in the class Archaeocyatha. It was described in 1967, and is known from the Early Cambrian.
