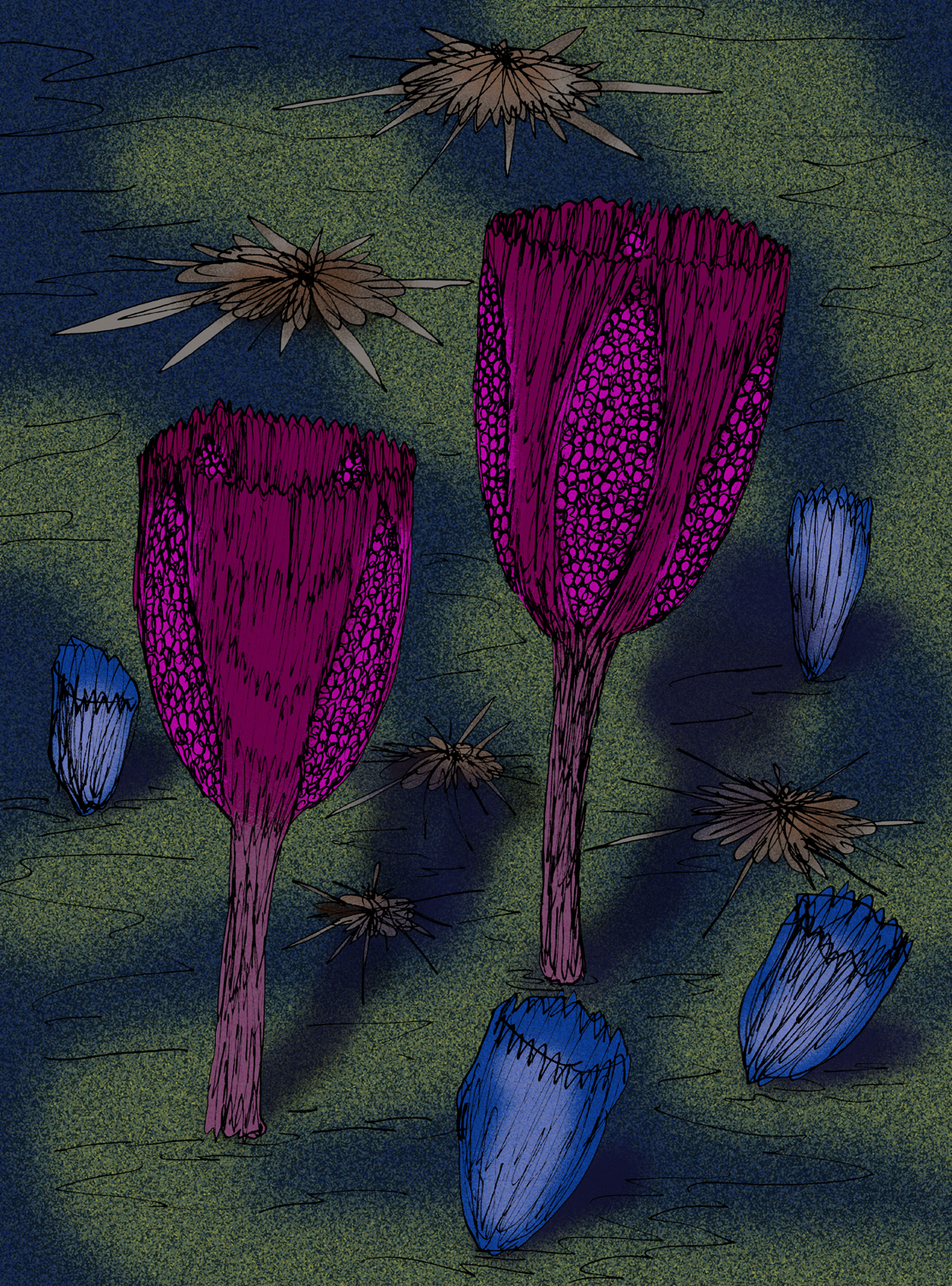
- Artist reconstruction of Petaloptyon danei

Scientific classification
- Kingdom: Animalia
- Phylum: Porifera
- Informal group: †Heteractinida
- Family: †Eiffeliidae; Rigby, 1986

Genera
- †Astraeoconus; †Chilcaia; †Eiffelia; †Eiffelospongia; †Gondekia; †Petaloptyon; †Toquimiella; †Zangerlispongia

= Eiffeliidae =

Extinct family of sponges

Eiffeliidae is an extinct family of sponges.

== Genera ==
The following genera are placed in the family:

- †Astraeoconus Rietschel, 1968
- †Chilcaia Carrera, 1994
- †Eiffelia Walcott, 1920 (synonyms: Lenastella Missarzhevsky in Missarzhevsky & Mambetov, 1981; Actinoites Duan, 1984; Niphadus Duan, 1984)
- †Eiffelospongia Rigby & Collins, 2004
- †Gondekia Rigby, 1991
- †Petaloptyon Raymond, 1931 (synonyms: Canistrumella Rigby, 1986)
- †Toquimiella Rigby, 1967
- †Zangerlispongia Rigby & Nitecki, 1975
