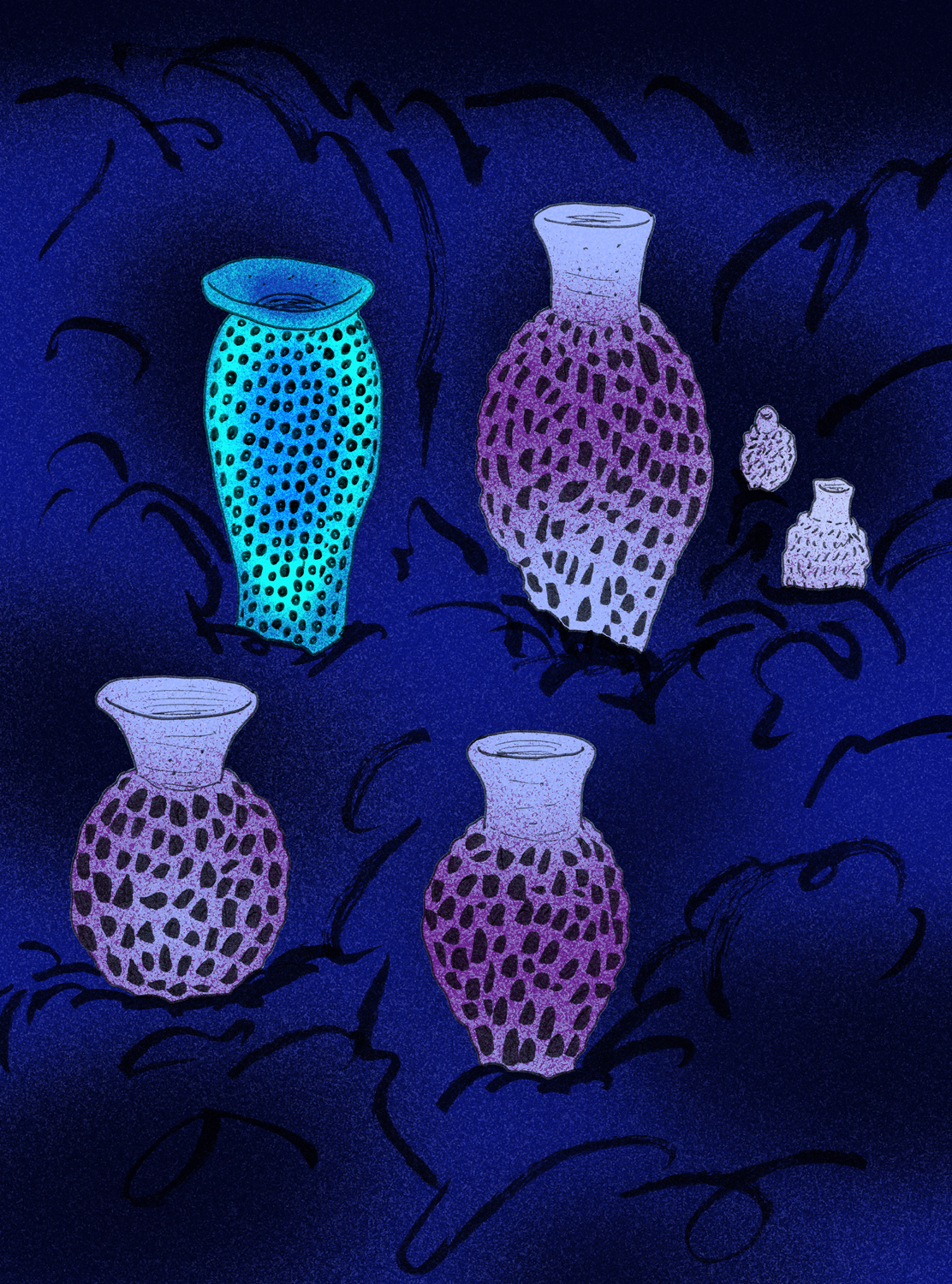
- Species of Jawonya

Scientific classification
- Kingdom: Animalia
- Phylum: Porifera
- Informal group: †Heteractinida; Hinde, 1887

Included groups
- See text

Synonyms
- Octactinellidae Hinde, 1887; Heteractinellidae Hinde, 1887; Wewokellida Croneis & Toomey, 1965

= Heteractinida =

Heteractinida Temporal range: Cambrian–Permian

Group of sponges

Heteractinida is an extinct grade of Paleozoic (Cambrian–Permian) sponges, sometimes used as a class or order. They are most commonly considered paraphyletic with respect to Calcarea (calcareous sponges), though some studies instead argue that they are paraphyletic relative to Hexactinellida (glass sponges). Heteractinids can be distinguished by their six-pronged (snowflake-shaped) spicules, whose symmetry historically suggested a relationship with the triradial calcarean sponges.

The sponge-like Cambrian Hetairacyathidae may be related to heteractinids, though most instead consider hetairacyathids to be closer to archaeocyaths. An example of a species in the Heteractinida class is the Gondekia lancifer; the Gondekia lancifer specimen is only the second articulated specimen known and is more complete than the holotype. It has an intact skeleton of felted sexiradiates of three orders of spicules.

== Subgroups ==
From Treatise on Invertebrate Paleontology:

- Order †Octactinellida Hinde, 1887
  - Family †Astraeospongiidae Miller, 1889 [Cambrian–Devonian]
  - Family †Eiffeliidae Rigby, 1986 [Cambrian–Mississippian]
  - Family †Nuchidae Pickett, 2002 [Cambrian]
  - Family †Wewokellidae King, 1943 [Mississippian–Permian]
  - (Cladistically included and parahyletically excluded) Calcarea
