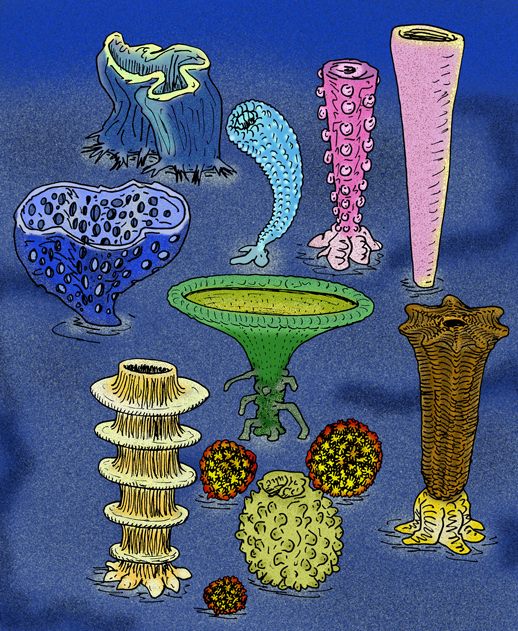

Scientific classification
- Kingdom: Animalia
- Phylum: Porifera
- Clade: †Archaeocyatha; Vologdin, 1937

Orders
- †Ajacicyathida R. Bedford & J. Bedford 1939; †Archaeocyathida Okulitch 1935; †Capsulocyathida Zhuravleva 1964; †Kazachstanicyathida Konyushkov 1967; †Monocyathida Okulitch 1935; †Putapacyathida Vologdin 1961

Synonyms
- Cyathospongia Okulitch, 1935; Pleospongia Okulitch, 1935

= Archaeocyatha =

Archaeocyatha Temporal range: Fortunian - Mid Cambrian (possible Ediacaran records)

Extinct class of sponges

Archaeocyatha (/ˈɑːrkioʊsaɪəθə/, "ancient cups") is a taxon of extinct, sessile, reef-building (Note: Archaeocyathid reef structures ("bioherms"), although not as massive as later coral reefs, might have been as deep as 10 m (33 ft) (Emiliani 1992:451).) marine sponges that lived in warm tropical and subtropical waters during the Cambrian Period. It is thought that the centre of the Archaeocyatha origin is now located in East Siberia, where they are first known from the beginning of the Tommotian Age of the Cambrian, 525 million years ago (mya). In other regions of the world, they appeared much later, during the Atdabanian, and quickly diversified into over a hundred families. They became the planet's first reef-building animals and are an index fossil for the Lower Cambrian worldwide.

== Preservation ==
The remains of Archaeocyatha are mostly preserved as carbonate structures in a limestone matrix. This means that the fossils cannot be chemically or mechanically isolated, save for some specimens that have already eroded out of their matrices, and their morphology has to be determined from thin cuts of the stone in which they were preserved.

== Geological history ==
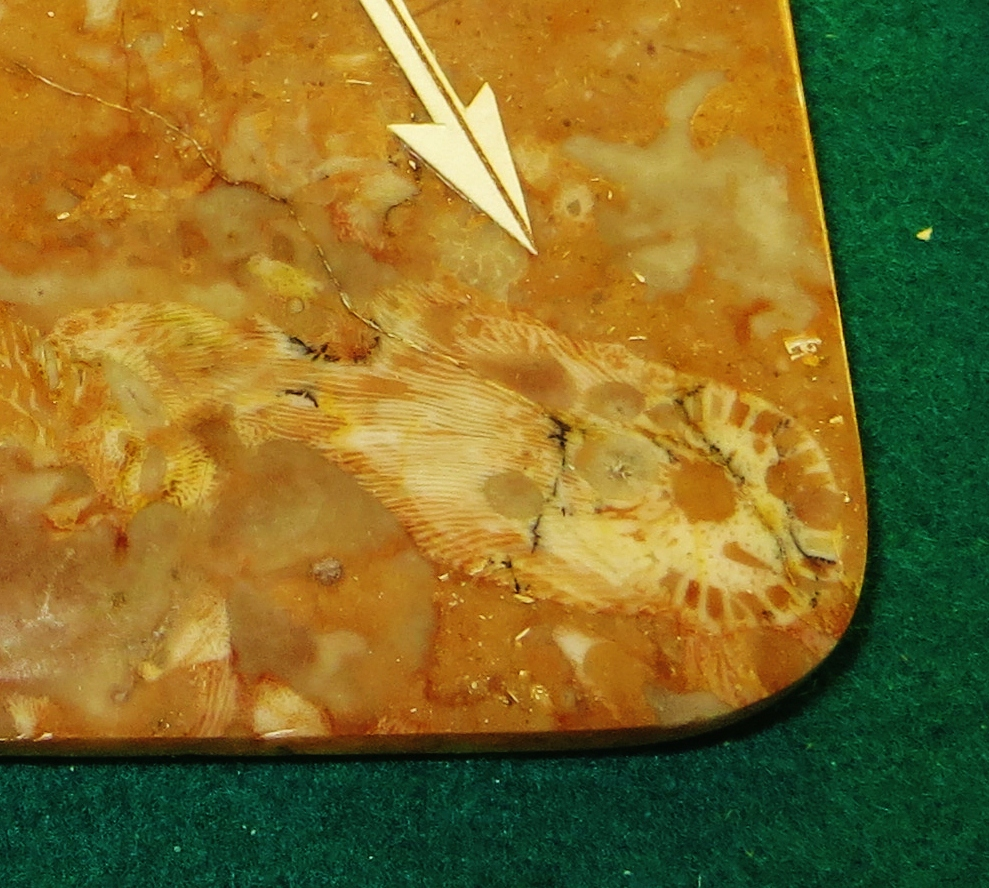
Metaldetes taylori, Cambrian of Australia

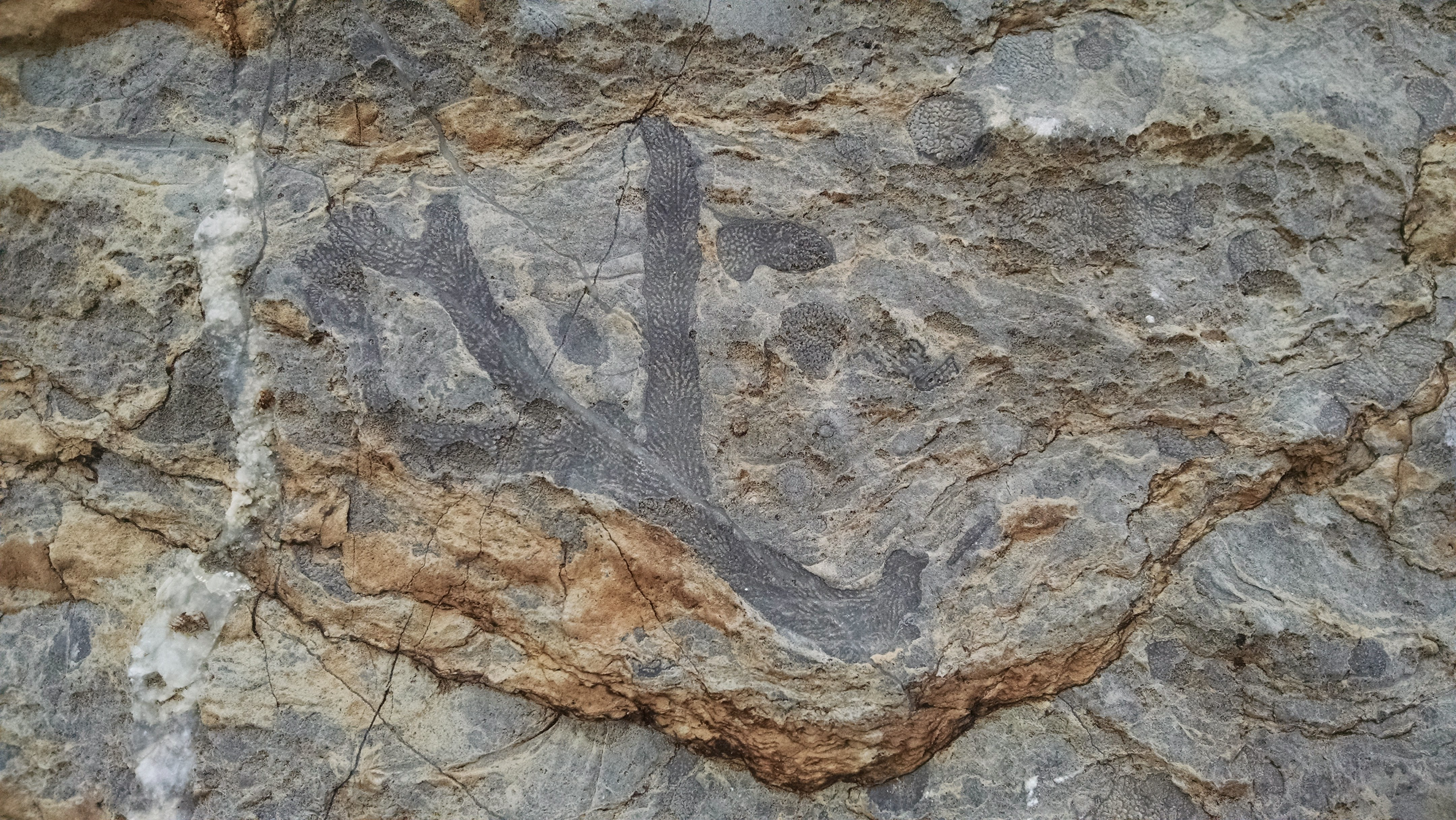
Branching form archaeocyath from Rowland's Reef in Nevada

Today, the archaeocyathan families are recognisable by small but consistent differences in their fossilised structures: Some archaeocyathans were built like nested bowls, while others were as long as 300mm. Some archaeocyaths were solitary organisms, while others formed colonies. In the beginning of the Toyonian Age around 516 mya, the archaeocyaths went into a sharp decline. Almost all species became extinct by the Middle Cambrian, with the final-known species, Antarcticocyathus webberi, disappearing just prior to the end of the Cambrian period. Their rapid decline and disappearance coincided with a rapid diversification of the Demosponges. As for the earliest archaeocyathan, the Ediacaran sponge Arimasia from the Nama Group may be within the clade and specifically allied with Monocyathea; however, this is unclear.

The archaeocyathans became the planet's first reef-building animals and are an index fossil for the Lower Cambrian worldwide. They were important reef-builders in the early to middle Cambrian, with reefs (and indeed any accumulation of carbonates) becoming very rare after the group's extinction until the diversification of new taxa of coral reef-builders in the Ordovician.

Antarcticocyathus was considered the only late Cambrian archaeocyath, but its reinterpretation as a lithisid sponge means that there are no archaeocyathans identified post the mid-Cambrian.

== Morphology ==
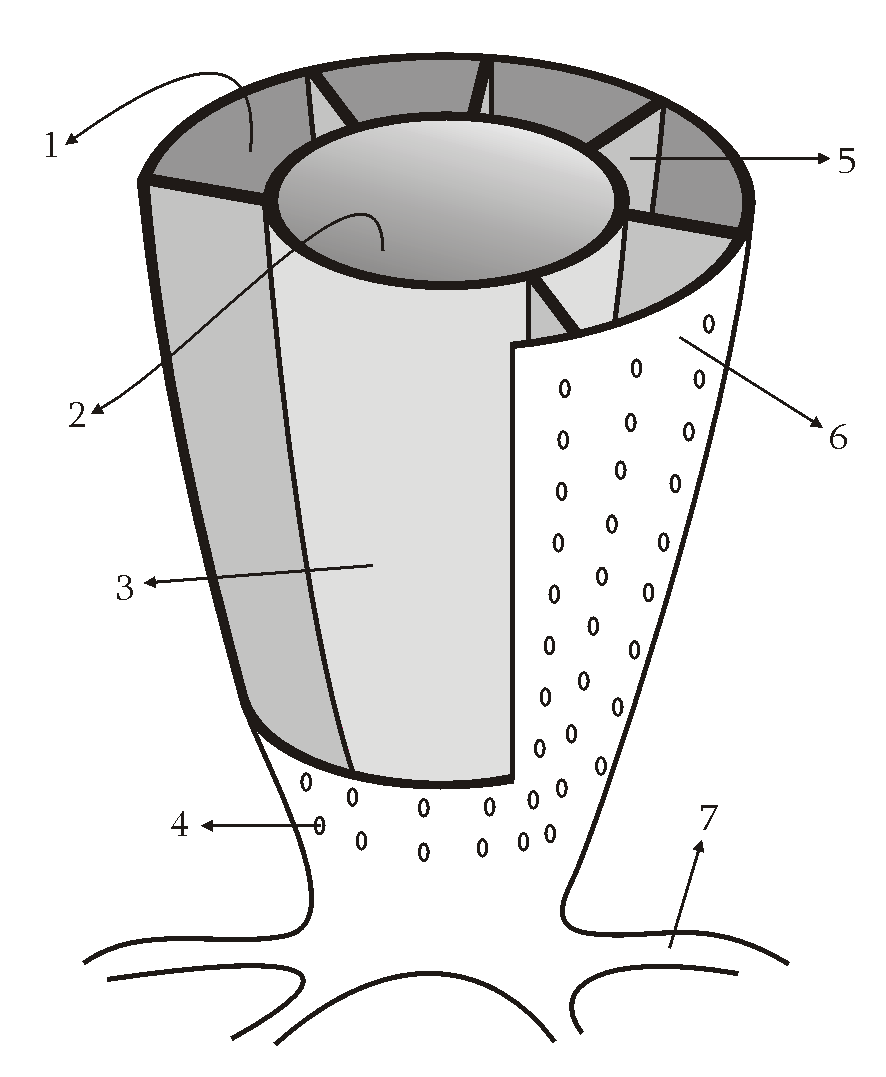
1 – Gap (intervallum) 2 – Central cavity 3 – Internal wall 4 – Pore (all the walls and septa have pores, not all are represented) 5 – Septum 6 – External wall 7 – Rhizoid

The typical archaeocyathid resembled a hollow horn coral. Each had a conical or vase-shaped porous skeleton of calcite similar to that of a sponge. The structure appeared like a pair of perforated, nested ice cream cones. Their skeletons consisted of either a single porous wall (Monocyathida), or more commonly as two concentric porous walls, an inner and outer wall separated by a space. Inside the inner wall was a cavity (like the inside of an ice cream cup). At the base, these pleosponges were held to the substrate by a holdfast. The body presumably occupied the space between the inner and outer shells (the intervallum).

== Ecology ==
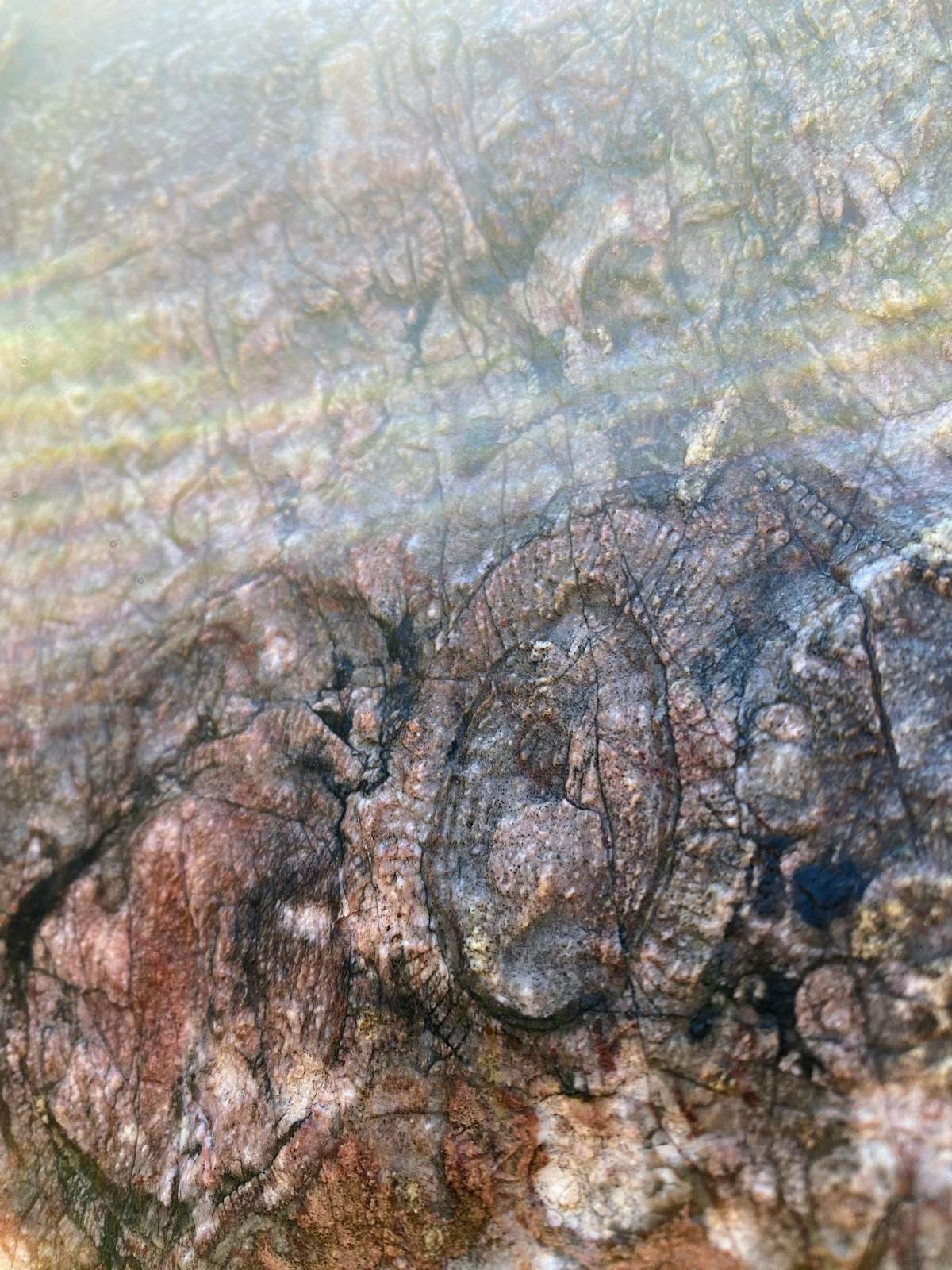
Archaeocyath, in situ at the Flinders Ranges.

Flow tank experiments suggest that archaeocyathan morphology allowed them to exploit flow gradients, either by passively pumping water through the skeleton, or, as in present-day, extant sponges, by drawing water through the pores, removing nutrients, and expelling spent water and wastes through the pores into the central space.

The size of the pores places a limit on the size of plankton that archaeocyaths could have consumed; different species had different sized pores, the largest large enough to conceivably consume mesozooplankton, possibly giving rise to different ecological niches within a single reef.

Although archaeocyaths have commonly been thought of as stenobionts narrowly adapted to carbonate-dominated marine settings, they were also present in siliciclastic-dominated environments as well.

== Distribution ==
A 2010 study showed that the centre of the Archaeocyatha origin is located in East Siberia, where they are first known from the beginning of the Tommotian Age of the Cambrian, 525 million years ago (mya). In other regions of the world, they appeared much later, during the Atdabanian, and quickly diversified into over a hundred families.

The archaeocyathans inhabited coastal areas of shallow seas. Their widespread distribution over almost the entire Cambrian world, as well as the taxonomic diversity of the species, might be explained by surmising that, like true sponges, they had a planktonic larval stage that enabled their wide spread.

== Taxonomy ==
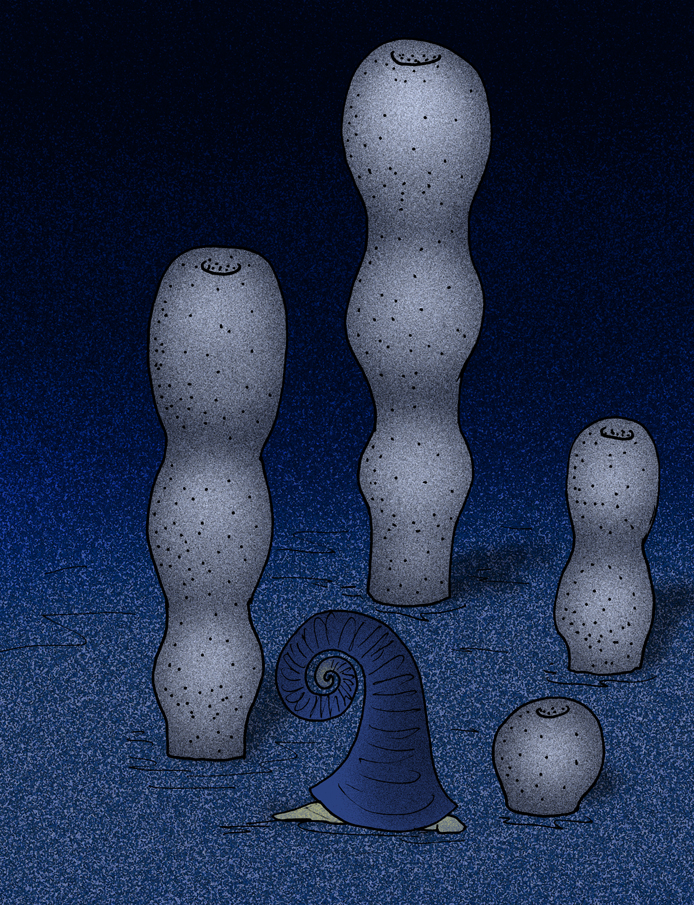
Restoration of Antarcticocyathus webberi

Their phylogenetic affiliation has been subject to changing interpretations, yet the consensus is growing that the archaeocyath was indeed a kind of sponge, thus sometimes called a pleosponge. But some invertebrate paleontologists have placed them in an extinct, separate phylum, known appropriately as the Archaeocyatha. However, one cladistic analysis suggests that Archaeocyatha is a clade nested within the phylum Porifera (better known as the true sponges).

True archaeocyathans coexisted with other enigmatic sponge-like animals. Radiocyatha and Cribricyatha were two diverse Cambrian classes comparable to Archaeocyatha, alongside genera such as Boyarinovicyathus, Proarchaeocyathus, Acanthinocyathus, and Osadchiites.

The clade Archaeocyatha have traditionally been divided into Regulares and Irregulares (Rowland, 2001):

- Putapacyathida Vologdin, 1961—incertae sedis
- Regulares
  - Monocyathida Okulitch 1935
  - Capsulocyathida Zhuravleva 1964
  - Ajacicyathida Bedford 1939
- Irregulares
  - Thalassocyathida
  - Archaeocyathida
  - Kazachstanicyathida Konyushkov 1967

However, Okulitch (1955), who at the time regarded the archaeocyathans as outside of Porifera, divided the phylum in three classes:

- Phylum Archaeocyatha Vologdin, 1937
  - Class Monocyathea Okulitch, 1943
  - Class Archaeocyathea Okulitch, 1943
  - Class Anthocyathea Okulitch, 1943

== Notable fossil sites ==
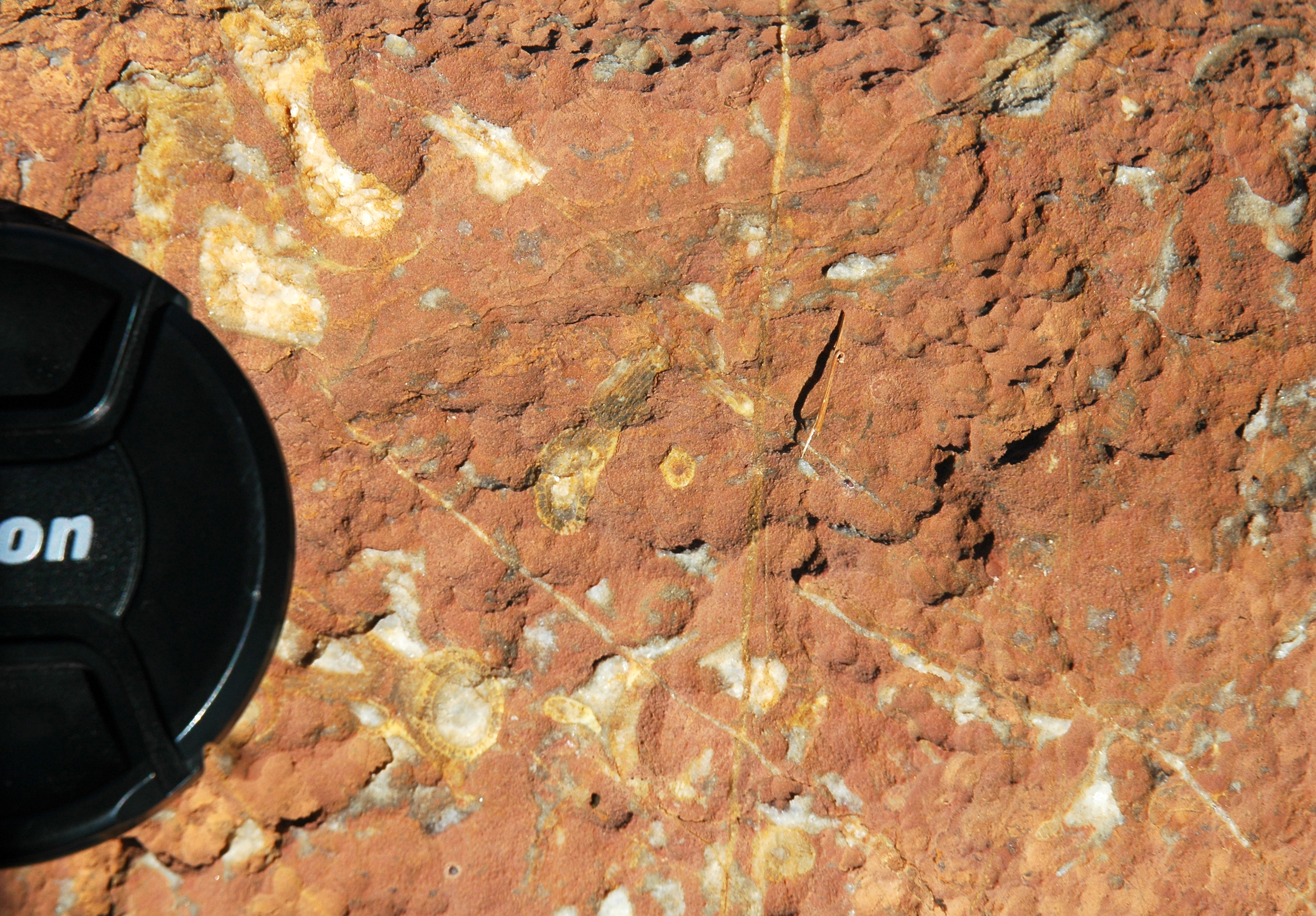
Ajax limestone

The Ajax Mine Fossil Reef in the Flinders Ranges of South Australia contains a large number of Lower Cambrian Archaeocyath fossils, exposed in limestone at ground level. The term "Ajax limestone" is now used worldwide, and this site has been state-heritage-listed as a place of palaeontological and geological significance. The site contains a sample of almost every species of archaeocyatha known to have existed within the Australian-Antarctic geologic province. Its diversity is much greater than any other assemblage in the province, and it also contains over 100 type species, which include over 40 type species from the Cambrian period. As of 2022 the fossil site is also one of seven sites in the Flinders Ranges under consideration for UNESCO World Heritage status.
