= Cocculina =

Scientific classification
- Kingdom: Animalia
- Phylum: Mollusca
- Class: Gastropoda
- Subclass: Vetigastropoda
- Family: Cocculinidae
- Genus: Cocculina; Dall, 1882

Genus of gastropods

Cocculina is a genus of sea snails, deep-sea limpets, marine gastropod mollusks in the family Cocculinidae.

== Species ==
Species within the genus Cocculina include:

- Cocculina alveolata Schepman, 1908
- Cocculina angulata R. B. Watson, 1883
- Cocculina baxteri McLean, 1987
- Cocculina cervae Fleming, 1948
- Cocculina cowani McLean, 1987
- Cocculina craigsmithi McLean, 1992
- Cocculina dalli A. E. Verrill, 1884
- Cocculina diomedae Dall, 1908
- Cocculina emsoni McLean & Harasewych, 1995
- Cocculina fenestrata Ardila & Harasewych, 2005
- Cocculina japonica Dall, 1907
- Cocculina leptalea A. E. Verrill, 1884
- Cocculina leptoglypta Dautzenberg & Fischer H., 1897
- Cocculina mamilla Di Geronimo, 1974
- Cocculina messingi McLean & Harasewych, 1995
- Cocculina nassa Dall, 1908
- Cocculina pacifica Kuroda & Habe, 1949
- Cocculina rathbuni Dall, 1882
- Cocculina superba Clarke, 1960
- Cocculina surugaensis Hasegawa, 1997
- Cocculina tenuitesta Hasegawa, 1997

Species brought into synonymy

- Cocculina agassizii Dall, 1908 : synonym of Coccocrater agassizii (Dall, 1908) (original combination)
- Cocculina casanica Dall, 1919: synonym of Lepeta caeca (O. F. Müller, 1776)
- Cocculina coercita Hedley, 1907: synonym of Cocculinella coercita (Hedley, 1907)
- Cocculina corrugata Jeffreys, 1883: synonym of Copulabyssia corrugata (Jeffreys, 1883)
- Cocculina craticulata Suter, 1908: synonym of Notocrater craticulata (Suter, 1908)
- Cocculina maxima Dautzenberg, 1925 : synonym of Pectinodonta maxima (Dautzenberg, 1925)
- Cocculina meridionalis Hedley, 1903: synonym of Propilidium tasmanicum (Pilsbry, 1895)
- Cocculina punctoradiata Kuroda & Habe, 1949: synonym of Coccopigya punctoradiata (Kuroda & Habe, 1949)
- Cocculina pustulosa Thiele, 1929: synonym of Notocrater minuta (Habe, 1958)
- Cocculina rhyssa Dall, 1925: synonym of Pectinodonta rhyssa (Dall, 1925)
- Cocculina spinigera Jeffreys, 1883: synonym of Coccopigya spinigera (Jeffreys, 1883)

Nomen dubium

- Cocculina ionica (Nordsieck F., 1973) (nomen dubium)
