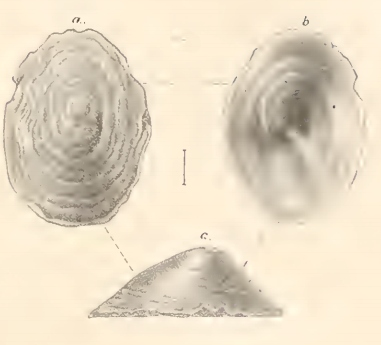
- Original drawing with several views of a shell of Pseudococculina rugosoplicata

Scientific classification
- Kingdom: Animalia
- Phylum: Mollusca
- Class: Gastropoda
- Subclass: Vetigastropoda
- Order: Lepetellida
- Superfamily: Lepetelloidea
- Family: Pseudococculinidae
- Genus: Pseudococculina; Schepman, 1908

Type species
- Pseudococculina rugosoplicata Schepman, 1908

= Pseudococculina =

Genus of gastropods

Pseudococculina is a genus of sea snails, marine gastropod molluscs in the family Pseudococculinidae.

== Description ==
The white shell has a patelliform shape with a posterior, inclined apex and a compressed, subspiral nucleus. Inside it has a porcellaneous, muscle-scar horseshoe-shaped, interrupted over the head.

The animal has a plumate gill, at the right side of the head. The right tentacle is thickened. There are two epipodial (i.e. situated in the lateral grooves between foot and mantle) filaments at the posterior part of the foot. The radula has large rhachidian teeth, with the cusp wanting or very obsolete. The fïrst lateral teeth are triangular, followed by 3 smaller, contorted laterals, with distinct cusps, a large cusped fifth lateral, and numerous uncini.

== Species ==
Species within the genus Pseudococculina include:

- Pseudococculina granulata Schepman, 1908
- Pseudococculina gregaria B.A. Marshall, 1986
- Pseudococculina rimula Simone & Cunha, 2003
- Pseudococculina rosea Habe, 1952
- Pseudococculina rugosoplicata Schepman, 1908
- Pseudococculina subcingulata (Kuroda & Habe, 1949)

Species brought into synonymy

- Pseudococculina concentrica Thiele, 1909: synonym of Amphiplica concentrica (Thiele, 1909)
- Pseudococculina gradata B.A. Marshall, 1986: synonym of Copulabyssia gradata (B. A. Marshall, 1986)
