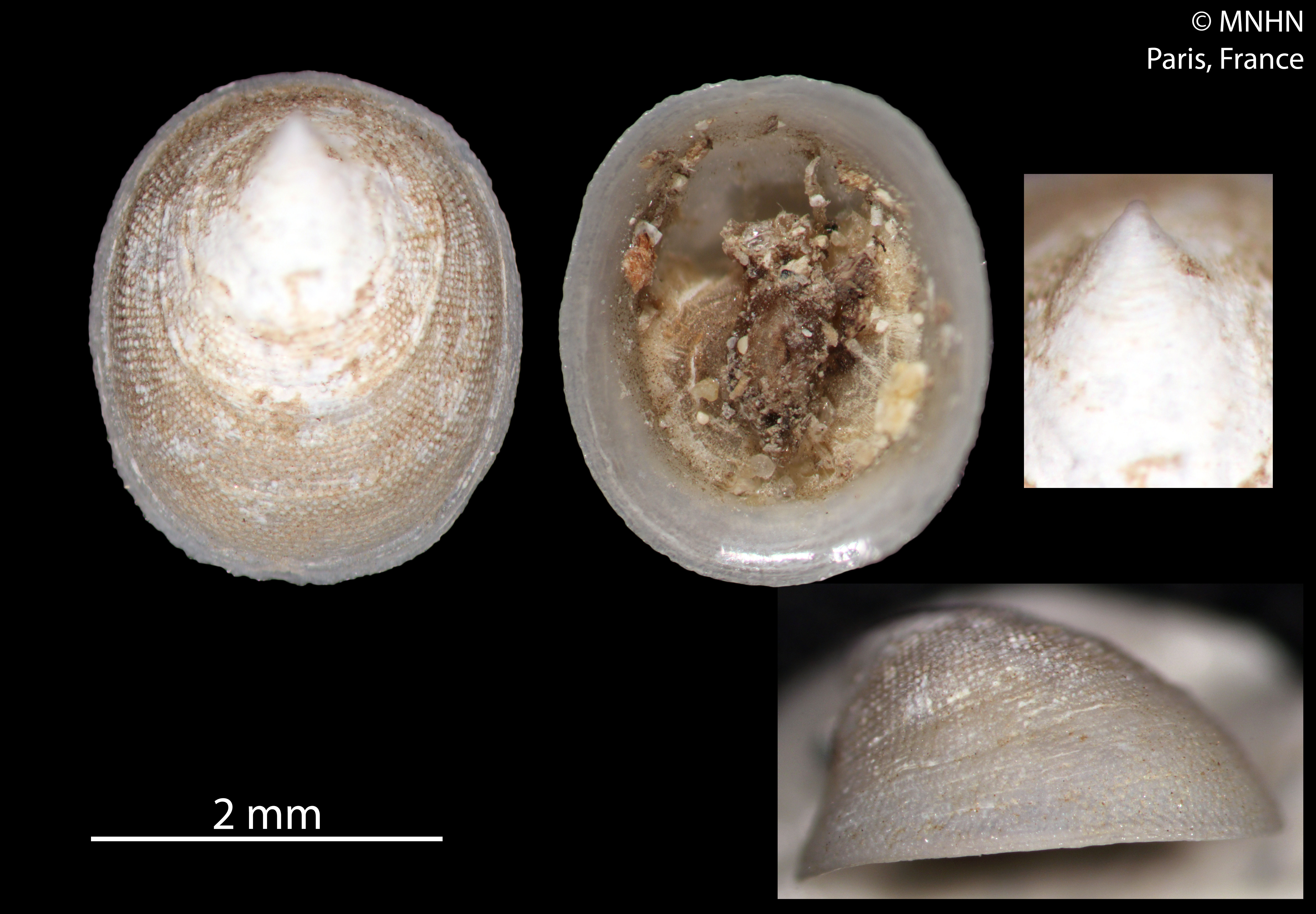
- Shell of Notocrater ponderi (paratype at MNHN, Paris)

Scientific classification
- Kingdom: Animalia
- Phylum: Mollusca
- Class: Gastropoda
- Subclass: Vetigastropoda
- Order: Lepetellida
- Superfamily: Lepetelloidea
- Family: Pseudococculinidae
- Genus: Notocrater
- Species: N. ponderi

Binomial name
- Notocrater ponderi B.A. Marshall, 1986

= Notocrater ponderi =

Species of gastropod

Notocrater ponderi is a species of small sea snail, a marine gastropod mollusk in the family Pseudococculinidae, the false limpets.

== Distribution ==
This marine species occurs off New South Wales, Australia and in the Tasman Sea.
