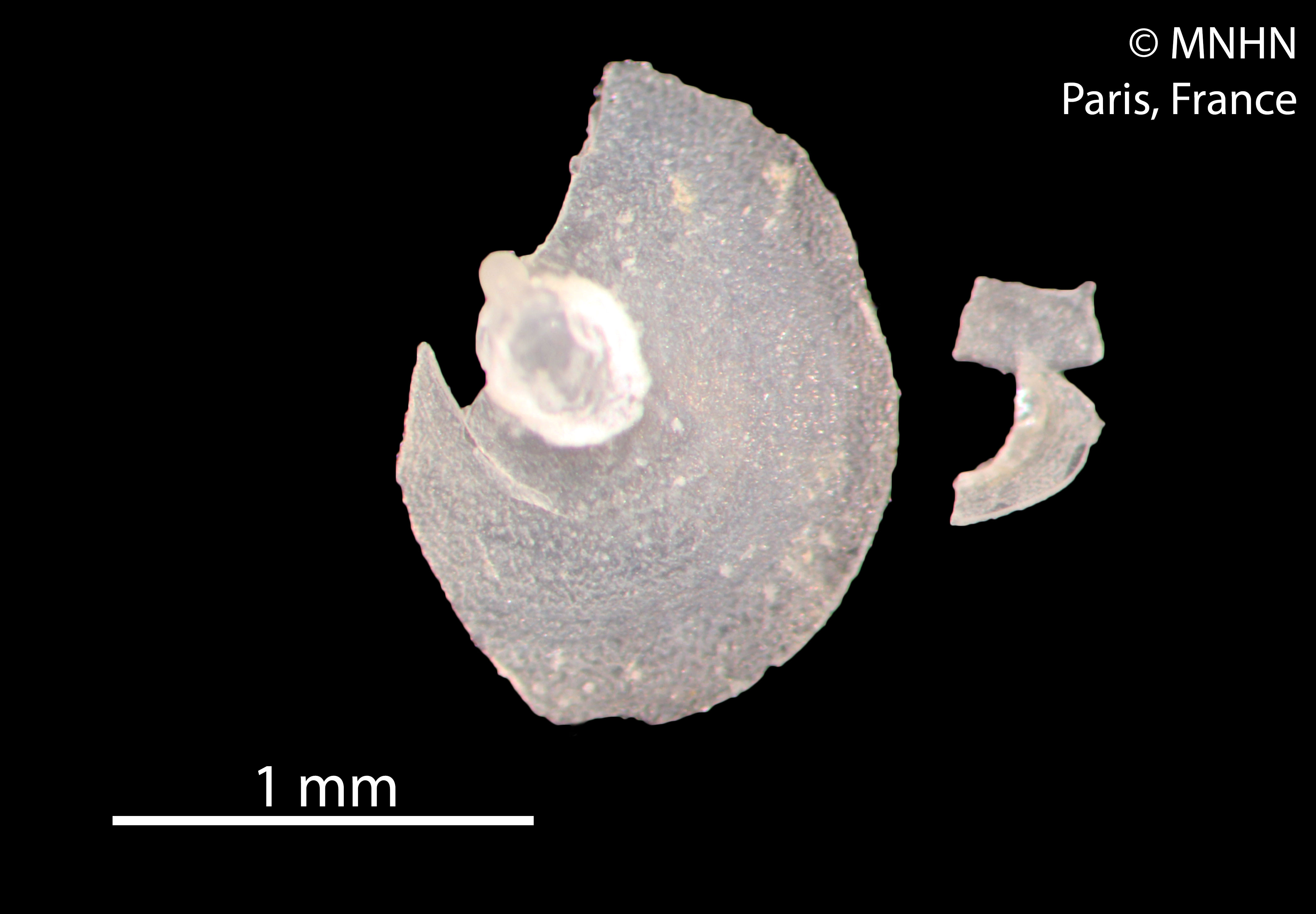
- Shell of Caymanabyssia sinespina (paratype at MNHN, Paris)

Scientific classification
- Kingdom: Animalia
- Phylum: Mollusca
- Class: Gastropoda
- Subclass: Vetigastropoda
- Order: Lepetellida
- Superfamily: Lepetelloidea
- Family: Caymanabyssiidae
- Genus: Caymanabyssia
- Species: C. sinespina

Binomial name
- Caymanabyssia sinespina B.A. Marshall, 1986

= Caymanabyssia sinespina =

Species of gastropod

Caymanabyssia sinespina is a species of small sea snail, a marine gastropod mollusk in the family Caymanabyssiidae, the false limpets.

== Distribution ==
This marine species occurs off New Zealand.
