= Pyropelta elongata =

Scientific classification
- Kingdom: Animalia
- Phylum: Mollusca
- Class: Gastropoda
- Subclass: Vetigastropoda
- Order: Lepetellida
- Superfamily: Lepetelloidea
- Family: Pyropeltidae
- Genus: Pyropelta
- Species: P. elongata

Binomial name
- Pyropelta elongata S.Q. Zhang & S.P. Zhang, 2017

Species of gastropod

Pyropelta elongata is a species of small sea snail, a deep-water limpet, a marine gastropod mollusk in the family Pyropeltidae.

== Distribution ==
This species occurs in South China Sea.
