= Punctabyssia tibbetsi =

Scientific classification
- Kingdom: Animalia
- Phylum: Mollusca
- Class: Gastropoda
- Subclass: Vetigastropoda
- Order: Lepetellida
- Superfamily: Lepetelloidea
- Family: Pseudococculinidae
- Genus: Punctabyssia
- Species: P. tibbetsi

Binomial name
- Punctabyssia tibbetsi McLean, 1991

Species of gastropod

Punctabyssia tibbetsi is a species of small sea snail, a marine gastropod mollusk in the family Pseudococculinidae, the false limpets.

== Distribution ==
This marine species occurs on the East Pacific Rise.
