= Pseudococculina subcingulata =

Scientific classification
- Kingdom: Animalia
- Phylum: Mollusca
- Class: Gastropoda
- Subclass: Vetigastropoda
- Order: Lepetellida
- Superfamily: Lepetelloidea
- Family: Pseudococculinidae
- Genus: Pseudococculina
- Species: P. subcingulata

Binomial name
- Pseudococculina subcingulata (Kuroda & Habe, 1949)

Species of gastropod

Pseudococculina subcingulata is a species of small sea snail, a marine gastropod mollusk in the family Pseudococculinidae, the false limpets.
