= Tentaoculus georgianus =

Scientific classification
- Kingdom: Animalia
- Phylum: Mollusca
- Class: Gastropoda
- Subclass: Vetigastropoda
- Order: Lepetellida
- Superfamily: Lepetelloidea
- Family: Pseudococculinidae
- Genus: Tentaoculus
- Species: T. georgianus

Binomial name
- Tentaoculus georgianus (Dall, 1927)

Synonyms
- Cocculina georgiana Dall, 1927

Species of gastropod

Tentaoculus georgianus is a species of small sea snail, a marine gastropod mollusk in the family Pseudococculinidae, the false limpets.

== Distribution ==
This marine species occurs in the Atlantic Ocean off Georgia, USA.

== Description ==
The maximum recorded shell length is 3.5 mm.

== Habitat ==
Minimum recorded depth is 805 m. Maximum recorded depth is 805 m.
