= Aenigmabonus kurilokamtschaticus =

Scientific classification
- Kingdom: Animalia
- Phylum: Mollusca
- Class: Gastropoda
- Subclass: Vetigastropoda
- Order: Lepetellida
- Superfamily: Lepetelloidea
- Family: Bathyphytophilidae
- Genus: Aenigmabonus
- Species: A. kurilokamtschaticus

Binomial name
- Aenigmabonus kurilokamtschaticus Moskalev, 1978

Species of gastropod

Aenigmabonus kurilokamtschaticus is a species of very small, deep water sea snail, a marine gastropod mollusk in the family Bathyphytophilidae, the false limpets.

== Habitat ==
This species is found in the following habitats:

- Brackish
- Marine
