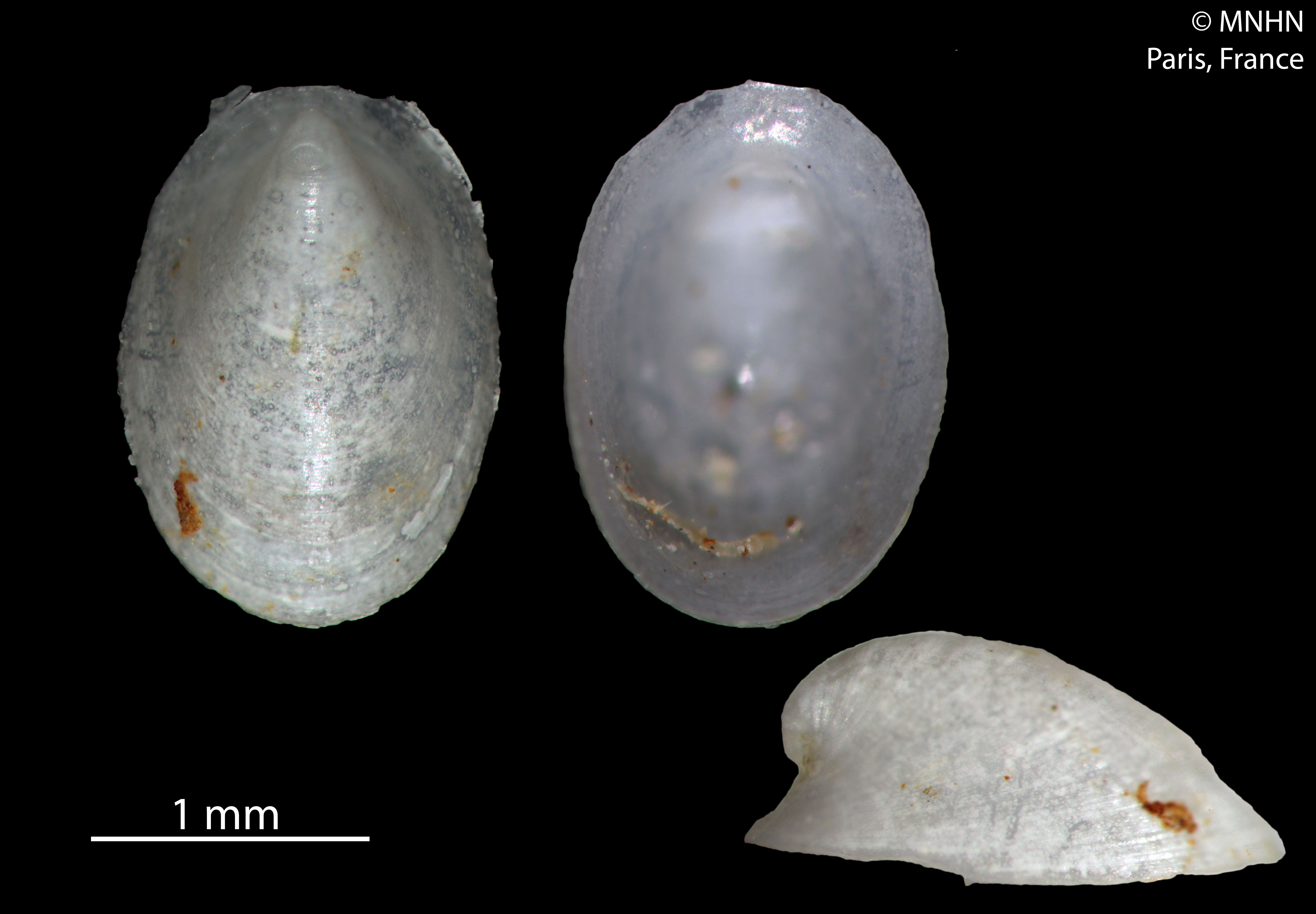

Scientific classification
- Kingdom: Animalia
- Phylum: Mollusca
- Class: Gastropoda
- Subclass: Vetigastropoda
- Order: Lepetellida
- Superfamily: Lepetelloidea
- Family: Pseudococculinidae
- Genus: Tentaoculus
- Species: T. haptricola

Binomial name
- Tentaoculus haptricola B.A. Marshall, 1986

= Tentaoculus haptricola =

Species of gastropod

Tentaoculus haptricola is a species of small sea snail, a marine gastropod mollusk in the family Pseudococculinidae, the false limpets.

== Distribution ==
This marine species is endemic to New Zealand.
