= Tentaoculus eritmetus =

Scientific classification
- Kingdom: Animalia
- Phylum: Mollusca
- Class: Gastropoda
- Subclass: Vetigastropoda
- Order: Lepetellida
- Superfamily: Lepetelloidea
- Family: Pseudococculinidae
- Genus: Tentaoculus
- Species: T. eritmetus

Binomial name
- Tentaoculus eritmetus (A. E. Verrill, 1884)

Synonyms
- Puncturella (Fissurisepta) eritmeta A. E. Verrill, 1884 (original description)

Species of gastropod

Tentaoculus eritmetus is a species of small sea snail, a marine gastropod mollusk in the family Pseudococculinidae, the false limpets.

== Distribution ==
This species was found in the Atlantic Ocean off New England, USA.

== Description ==
The maximum recorded shell length is 5 mm.

== Habitat ==
Minimum recorded depth is 2654 m. Maximum recorded depth is 2654 m.
