= Bathyphytophilus caribaeus =

Scientific classification
- Kingdom: Animalia
- Phylum: Mollusca
- Class: Gastropoda
- Subclass: Vetigastropoda
- Order: Lepetellida
- Superfamily: Lepetelloidea
- Family: Bathyphytophilidae
- Genus: Bathyphytophilus
- Species: B. caribaeus

Binomial name
- Bathyphytophilus caribaeus Moskalev, 1978

Species of gastropod

Bathyphytophilus caribaeus is a species of very small, deep water sea snail, a marine gastropod mollusk in the family Bathyphytophilidae, the false limpets.

== Distribution ==
This is a deep-water species occurring in the Caribbean Sea.

== Description ==
The maximum recorded shell length is 2.8 mm.

== Habitat ==
Minimum recorded depth is 2450 m. Maximum recorded depth is 6740 m.
