= Notocrater youngi =

Scientific classification
- Kingdom: Animalia
- Phylum: Mollusca
- Class: Gastropoda
- Subclass: Vetigastropoda
- Order: Lepetellida
- Superfamily: Lepetelloidea
- Family: Pseudococculinidae
- Genus: Notocrater
- Species: N. youngi

Binomial name
- Notocrater youngi McLean & Harasewych, 1995

Species of gastropod

Notocrater youngi is a species of small sea snail, a marine gastropod mollusk in the family Pseudococculinidae, the false limpets.

== Distribution ==
This species occurs in the Atlantic Ocean off the Bahamas; and at the Caribbean coast of Colombia.

== Description ==
The maximum recorded shell length is 3.14 mm.

== Habitat ==
Minimum recorded depth is 70 m. Maximum recorded depth is 518 m.
