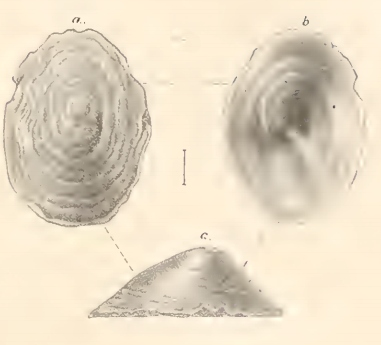
- Original drawing with several views of a shell of Pseudococculina rugosoplicata

Scientific classification
- Kingdom: Animalia
- Phylum: Mollusca
- Class: Gastropoda
- Subclass: Vetigastropoda
- Order: Lepetellida
- Superfamily: Lepetelloidea
- Family: Pseudococculinidae
- Genus: Pseudococculina
- Species: P. rugosoplicata

Binomial name
- Pseudococculina rugosoplicata Schepman, 1908

= Pseudococculina rugosoplicata =

Species of gastropod

Pseudococculina rugosoplicata is a species of small sea snail, a marine gastropod mollusk in the family Pseudococculinidae, the false limpets.

== Description ==
The small, white shell has an elevated form. It is oval and thin. The margin rests entirely on a plane surface. The front slope is the largest and has a convex shape. The side slopes are irregularly convex, being slightly compressed at some distance from the apex. The posterior slope is slightly concave. The apex is blunt, placed at about two-thirds of the total length. There is no nucleus caused by a strong erosion of the apex. The sculpture consists of irregular concentric rugosities or wrinkles, generally more distant from each other towards the apex, more crowded towards the margin, with a tendency to form lamellae. On some parts the upper side of the rugosities has coarse, short, riblike radiant striae, wanting in other places, perhaps by erosion. The inside of the shell has a smooth surface.

The rhachidian tooth of the radula is elongate with convex sides. It has no reflected cusp, the upper margin being only irregularly waved. Near the base an oval spot seems to be thickened. The first lateral tooth is triangular, also without a distinct cusp, but with a reflected or thickened upper margin. It is followed by three laterals, which are little different from each other, with a winged body, having the appearance of being turned outwards, the cusp standing at the distal side. Their cusps are simple. The next lateral has a quadrate body with a thickened stalk The rhachidian tooth stands at its median line, and a cusp consisting of a sharp tooth at the proximal side, and a wing-like part on the distal side, with a slightly denticulate margin. Of the numerous uncini, the proximal ones, which are the largest, have simple cusps, while those placed more outwards have small denticles.

== Distribution ==
This marine species occurs in the Indo-Australian archipelago.
