= Cocculinella osteophila =

Scientific classification
- Kingdom: Animalia
- Phylum: Mollusca
- Class: Gastropoda
- Subclass: Vetigastropoda
- Order: Lepetellida
- Superfamily: Lepetelloidea
- Family: Cocculinellidae
- Genus: Cocculinella
- Species: C. osteophila

Binomial name
- Cocculinella osteophila B.A. Marshall, 1983

Species of gastropod

Cocculinella osteophila is a species of small, deep water sea snail, a marine gastropod mollusk in the family Cocculinellidae, the limpets.

== Distribution ==
This marine species is endemic to New Zealand.
