= Pyropelta wakefieldi =

Scientific classification
- Kingdom: Animalia
- Phylum: Mollusca
- Class: Gastropoda
- Subclass: Vetigastropoda
- Order: Lepetellida
- Superfamily: Lepetelloidea
- Family: Pyropeltidae
- Genus: Pyropelta
- Species: P. wakefieldi

Binomial name
- Pyropelta wakefieldi McLean, 1992

Species of gastropod

Pyropelta wakefieldi is a species of sea snail, a marine gastropod mollusk in the family Pyropeltidae.

== Distribution ==
This marine species occurs off the Juan de Fuca Ridge, NE Pacific
