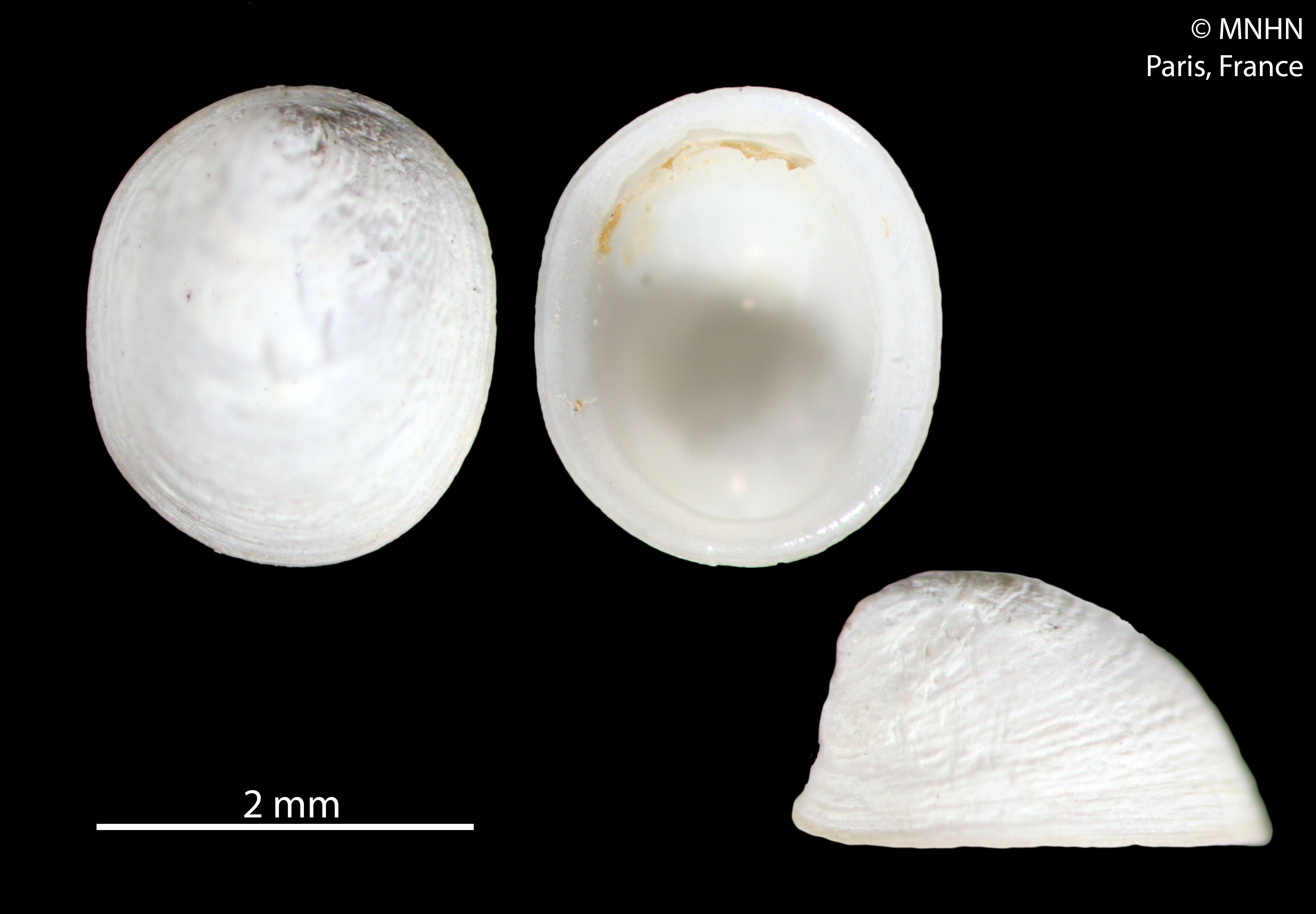
- Shell of Pseudococculina gregaria (paratype at MNHN, Paris)

Scientific classification
- Kingdom: Animalia
- Phylum: Mollusca
- Class: Gastropoda
- Subclass: Vetigastropoda
- Order: Lepetellida
- Superfamily: Lepetelloidea
- Family: Pseudococculinidae
- Genus: Pseudococculina
- Species: P. gregaria

Binomial name
- Pseudococculina gregaria B.A. Marshall, 1986

= Pseudococculina gregaria =

Species of gastropod

Pseudococculina gregaria is a species of small sea snail, a marine gastropod mollusk in the family Pseudococculinidae, the false limpets.

== Distribution ==
This marine species is endemic to New Zealand.
