= Punctabyssia =

Scientific classification
- Kingdom: Animalia
- Phylum: Mollusca
- Class: Gastropoda
- Subclass: Vetigastropoda
- Order: Lepetellida
- Superfamily: Lepetelloidea
- Family: Pseudococculinidae
- Genus: Punctabyssia; McLean, 1991

Genus of gastropods

Punctabyssia is a genus of small sea snails, marine gastropod mollusks in the family Pseudococculinidae, the false limpets.

== Species ==
Species within the genus Punctabyssia include:

- Punctabyssia tibbetsi McLean, 1991
