= Amphiplica plutonica =

Scientific classification
- Kingdom: Animalia
- Phylum: Mollusca
- Class: Gastropoda
- Subclass: Vetigastropoda
- Order: Lepetellida
- Family: Pseudococculinidae
- Genus: Amphiplica
- Species: A. plutonica

Binomial name
- Amphiplica plutonica Leal & Harasewych, 1999

Species of gastropod

Amphiplica plutonica is a species of sea snail, a marine gastropod mollusk in the family Pseudococculinidae.

== Distribution ==
This marine species was found in the Cayman Trench.

== Description ==
The maximum recorded shell length is 10.8 mm.

== Habitat ==
Minimum recorded depth is 6600 m. Maximum recorded depth is 7225 m.
