= Bathyphytophilus =

Scientific classification
- Kingdom: Animalia
- Phylum: Mollusca
- Class: Gastropoda
- Subclass: Vetigastropoda
- Order: Lepetellida
- Superfamily: Lepetelloidea
- Family: Bathyphytophilidae
- Genus: Bathyphytophilus; Moskalev, 1978

Genus of gastropods

Bathyphytophilus is a genus of very small, deep water sea snails, marine gastropod mollusks in the family Bathyphytophilidae, the false limpets.

== Species ==
Species within the genus Bathyphytophilus include:

- Bathyphytophilus caribaeus Moskalev, 1978
- Bathyphytophilus diegensis Haszprunar, G. & J.H. McLean, 1996
