= Osteopelta mirabilis =

Scientific classification
- Kingdom: Animalia
- Phylum: Mollusca
- Class: Gastropoda
- Subclass: Vetigastropoda
- Order: Lepetellida
- Family: Osteopeltidae
- Genus: Osteopelta
- Species: O. mirabilis

Binomial name
- Osteopelta mirabilis Marshall, 1987

Species of gastropod

Osteopelta mirabilis is a species of sea snail, a marine gastropod mollusc in the family Osteopeltidae.

== Distribution ==
Chatham Rise and off the Chatham Islands, New Zealand
