= Kurilabyssia squamosa =

Scientific classification
- Kingdom: Animalia
- Phylum: Mollusca
- Class: Gastropoda
- Subclass: Vetigastropoda
- Order: Lepetellida
- Family: Pseudococculinidae
- Genus: Kurilabyssia
- Species: K. squamosa

Binomial name
- Kurilabyssia squamosa Moskalev, 1976

Species of gastropod

Kurilabyssia squamosa is a species of small sea snail, a marine gastropod mollusk in the family Pseudococculinidae, the false limpets.
