= Notocrater meridionalis =

Scientific classification
- Kingdom: Animalia
- Phylum: Mollusca
- Class: Gastropoda
- Subclass: Vetigastropoda
- Order: Lepetellida
- Family: Pseudococculinidae
- Genus: Notocrater
- Species: N. meridionalis

Binomial name
- Notocrater meridionalis (Hedley, 1903)

Species of gastropod

Notocrater meridionalis is a species of small sea snail, a marine gastropod mollusk in the family Pseudococculinidae, the false limpets.
