= Kurilabyssia =

Scientific classification
- Kingdom: Animalia
- Phylum: Mollusca
- Class: Gastropoda
- Subclass: Vetigastropoda
- Order: Lepetellida
- Superfamily: Lepetelloidea
- Family: Pseudococculinidae
- Genus: Kurilabyssia; Moskalev, 1976

Type species
- Kurilabyssia squamosa Moskalev, 1976

Genus of gastropods

Kurilabyssia is a genus of small sea snails, marine gastropod mollusks in the family Pseudococculinidae, the false limpets.

== Species ==
Species within the genus Kurilabyssia include:

- Kurilabyssia antipodensis B.A. Marshall, 1986
- Kurilabyssia squamosa Moskalev, 1976
