= Notocrater houbricki =

Scientific classification
- Kingdom: Animalia
- Phylum: Mollusca
- Class: Gastropoda
- Subclass: Vetigastropoda
- Order: Lepetellida
- Family: Pseudococculinidae
- Genus: Notocrater
- Species: N. houbricki

Binomial name
- Notocrater houbricki McLean & Harasewych, 1995

Species of gastropod

Notocrater houbricki is a species of small sea snail, a marine gastropod mollusk in the family Pseudococculinidae, the false limpets.

== Distribution ==
This species occurs in the Atlantic Ocean off the Bahamas and off the Caribbean coast of Colombia.

== Description ==
The maximum recorded shell length is 3.3 mm.

== Habitat ==
Minimum recorded depth is 89 m. Maximum recorded depth is 412 m.
