= Amphiplica knudseni =

Scientific classification
- Kingdom: Animalia
- Phylum: Mollusca
- Class: Gastropoda
- Subclass: Vetigastropoda
- Order: Lepetellida
- Family: Pseudococculinidae
- Genus: Amphiplica
- Species: A. knudseni

Binomial name
- Amphiplica knudseni McLean, 1988

Species of gastropod

Amphiplica knudseni is a species of small sea snail, a marine gastropod mollusk in the family Pseudococculinidae, the false limpets.

Paratype in the Museum of New Zealand.

== Distribution ==
This marine species is endemic to the Tasman Basin, New Zealand.
