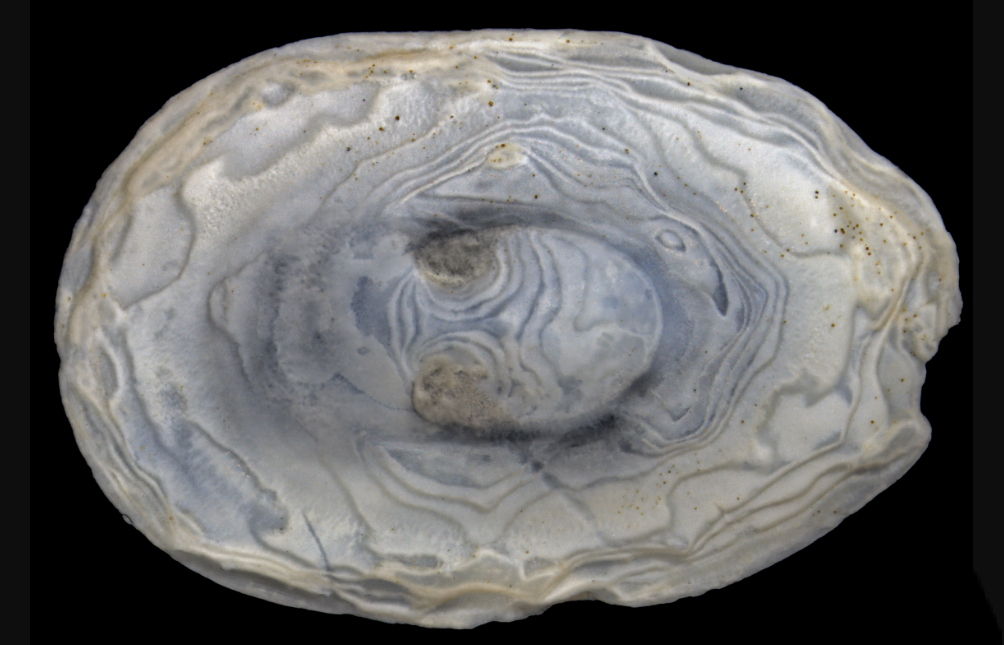
- Shell of Pyropelta ovalis (holotype at MNHN, Paris)

Scientific classification
- Kingdom: Animalia
- Phylum: Mollusca
- Class: Gastropoda
- Subclass: Vetigastropoda
- Order: Lepetellida
- Superfamily: Lepetelloidea
- Family: Pyropeltidae
- Genus: Pyropelta; McLean & Haszprunar, 1987

Type species
- Pyropelta musaica J. H. McLean & Haszprunar, 1987

= Pyropelta =

Genus of gastropods

Pyropelta is a genus of small sea snails, deep-water limpets, marine gastropod molluscs in the family Pyropeltidae.

The name Pyropelta is from the Greek; it means "fire limpet" because these small deepwater limpets live near hot hydrothermal vents and similar habitat.

== Species ==
Species within the genus Pyropelta include:

- Pyropelta bohlei L. Beck, 1996
- Pyropelta corymba McLean & Haszprunar, 1987
- Pyropelta craigsmithi (J. H. McLean, 1992)
- Pyropelta elongata S.Q. Zhang & S.P. Zhang, 2017
- Pyropelta musaica McLean & Haszprunar, 1987
- Pyropelta oluae Warén & Bouchet, 2009
- Pyropelta ovalis L. Beck, 2023
- Pyropelta ryukyuensis Sasaki, Okutani & Fujikura, 2008
- † Pyropelta seca Kiel, Hybertsen, Hyžný & Klompmaker, 2019
- Pyropelta sibuetae Warén & Bouchet, 2009
- Pyropelta wakefieldi McLean, 1992
- Pyropelta yamato Sasaki, Okutani & Fujikura, 2003
