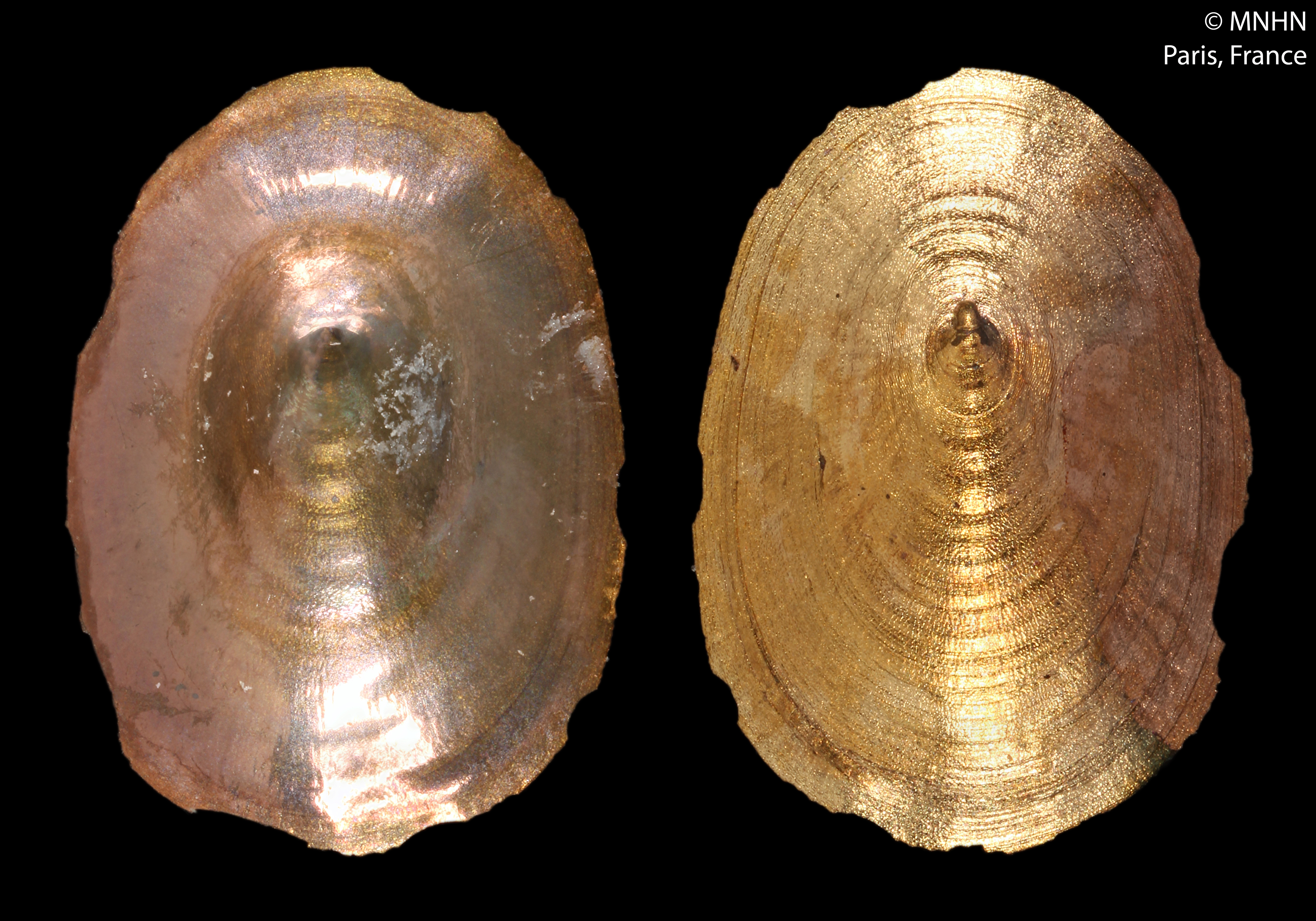

Scientific classification
- Kingdom: Animalia
- Phylum: Mollusca
- Class: Gastropoda
- Subclass: Vetigastropoda
- Order: Lepetellida
- Family: Pseudococculinidae
- Genus: Tentaoculus
- Species: T. granulatus

Binomial name
- Tentaoculus granulatus Warén & Bouchet, 2009

= Tentaoculus granulatus =

Species of gastropod

Tentaoculus granulatus is a species of sea snail, deep-sea limpet, a marine gastropod mollusc in the family Pseudococculinidae.

== Description ==
The length of the shell attains 3.8 mm.

== Distribution ==
This small limpet occurs at methane seeps in deep water off the Congo River.
