= Pyropelta bohlei =

Scientific classification
- Kingdom: Animalia
- Phylum: Mollusca
- Class: Gastropoda
- Subclass: Vetigastropoda
- Order: Lepetellida
- Family: Pyropeltidae
- Genus: Pyropelta
- Species: P. bohlei

Binomial name
- Pyropelta bohlei Beck, 1996

Species of gastropod

Pyropelta bohlei is a species of small sea snail, a deep-water limpet, a marine gastropod mollusk in the family Pyropeltidae.

== Habitat ==
This small limpet occurs at hydrothermal vents and seeps.
