= Aenigmabonus =

Scientific classification
- Kingdom: Animalia
- Phylum: Mollusca
- Class: Gastropoda
- Subclass: Vetigastropoda
- Order: Lepetellida
- Superfamily: Lepetelloidea
- Family: Bathyphytophilidae
- Genus: Aenigmabonus; Moskalev, 1978

Genus of gastropods

Aenigmabonus is a genus of very small, deep water sea snails, marine gastropod mollusks in the family Bathyphytophilidae, the false limpets.

== Species ==
Species within the genus Aenigmabonus include:

- Aenigmabonus kurilokamtschaticus Moskalev, 1978
