= Pyropelta yamato =

Scientific classification
- Kingdom: Animalia
- Phylum: Mollusca
- Class: Gastropoda
- Subclass: Vetigastropoda
- Order: Lepetellida
- Family: Pyropeltidae
- Genus: Pyropelta
- Species: P. yamato

Binomial name
- Pyropelta yamato Sasaki, Okutani & Fujikura, 2003

Species of gastropod

Pyropelta yamato is a species of small sea snail, a deep-water limpet, a marine gastropod mollusks in the family Pyropeltidae.

== Habitat ==
This small limpet occurs at hydrothermal vents and seeps
