= Osteopelta ceticola =

Scientific classification
- Kingdom: Animalia
- Phylum: Mollusca
- Class: Gastropoda
- Subclass: Vetigastropoda
- Order: Lepetellida
- Family: Osteopeltidae
- Genus: Osteopelta
- Species: O. ceticola

Binomial name
- Osteopelta ceticola Warén, 1989

Species of gastropod

Osteopelta ceticola is a species of sea snail, a marine gastropod mollusc in the family Osteopeltidae.

== Distribution ==
This species occurs in the Atlantic Ocean off Iceland.
