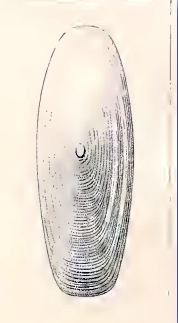
- Cocculinella minutissima

Scientific classification
- Kingdom: Animalia
- Phylum: Mollusca
- Class: Gastropoda
- Subclass: Vetigastropoda
- Order: Lepetellida
- Superfamily: Lepetelloidea
- Family: Cocculinellidae
- Genus: Cocculinella; Thiele, 1909

Type species
- Acmaea minutissima E. A. Smith, 1904

= Cocculinella =

Genus of gastropods

Cocculinella is a genus of small, deep water sea snails, marine gastropod mollusks in the family Cocculinellidae, the limpets.

== Species ==
Species within the genus Cocculinella include:

- Cocculinella coercita (Hedley, 1907)
- Cocculinella kopua B.A. Marshall, 1983
- Cocculinella minutissima (E. A. Smith, 1904)
- Cocculinella osteophila B.A. Marshall, 1983
