= Caymanabyssia spina =

Scientific classification
- Kingdom: Animalia
- Phylum: Mollusca
- Class: Gastropoda
- Subclass: Vetigastropoda
- Order: Lepetellida
- Family: Caymanabyssiidae
- Genus: Caymanabyssia
- Species: C. spina

Binomial name
- Caymanabyssia spina Moskalev, 1976

Species of gastropod

Caymanabyssia spina is a species of small sea snail, a marine gastropod mollusk in the family Caymanabyssiidae, the false limpets.

== Description ==
The maximum recorded shell length is 3 mm.

== Habitat ==
Minimum recorded depth is 6760 m. Maximum recorded depth is 7225 m.
