= Caymanabyssia vandoverae =

Scientific classification
- Kingdom: Animalia
- Phylum: Mollusca
- Class: Gastropoda
- Subclass: Vetigastropoda
- Order: Lepetellida
- Family: Caymanabyssiidae
- Genus: Caymanabyssia
- Species: C. vandoverae

Binomial name
- Caymanabyssia vandoverae McLean, 1991

Species of gastropod

Caymanabyssia vandoverae is a species of small sea snail, a marine gastropod mollusk in the family Caymanabyssiidae, the false limpets.
