= Pyropelta musaica =

Scientific classification
- Kingdom: Animalia
- Phylum: Mollusca
- Class: Gastropoda
- Subclass: Vetigastropoda
- Order: Lepetellida
- Family: Pyropeltidae
- Genus: Pyropelta
- Species: P. musaica

Binomial name
- Pyropelta musaica McLean & Haszprunar, 1987

Species of gastropod

Pyropelta musaica is a species of small sea snail, a deep-water limpet, a marine gastropod mollusks in the family Pyropeltidae.

== Distribution ==
This marine species occurs off the Juan de Fuca Ridge, Northeast Pacific

== Habitat ==
This small limpet occurs at hydrothermal vents and seeps
