= Copulabyssia riosi =

Scientific classification
- Kingdom: Animalia
- Phylum: Mollusca
- Class: Gastropoda
- Subclass: Vetigastropoda
- Order: Lepetellida
- Family: Pseudococculinidae
- Genus: Copulabyssia
- Species: C. riosi

Binomial name
- Copulabyssia riosi Leal & Simone, 2000

Species of gastropod

Copulabyssia riosi is a species of sea snail, a marine gastropod mollusk in the family Pseudococculinidae.

== Distribution ==
This species occurs in the Atlantic Ocean off Brazil.

== Description ==
The maximum recorded shell length is 3.5 mm.

== Habitat ==
Minimum recorded depth is 960 m. Maximum recorded depth is 1320 m.
