= Amphiplica venezuelensis =

Scientific classification
- Kingdom: Animalia
- Phylum: Mollusca
- Class: Gastropoda
- Subclass: Vetigastropoda
- Order: Lepetellida
- Family: Pseudococculinidae
- Genus: Amphiplica
- Species: A. venezuelensis

Binomial name
- Amphiplica venezuelensis McLean, 1988

Species of gastropod

Amphiplica venezuelensis is a species of small sea snail, a marine gastropod mollusk in the family Pseudococculinidae, the false limpets.

== Distribution ==
This marine species is found in the Venezuelan Basin, Venezuela.

== Description ==
The maximum recorded shell length is 14.8 mm.

== Habitat ==
Minimum recorded depth is 3518 m. Maximum recorded depth is 5057 m.
