= Caymanabyssia rhina =

Scientific classification
- Kingdom: Animalia
- Phylum: Mollusca
- Class: Gastropoda
- Subclass: Vetigastropoda
- Order: Lepetellida
- Family: Caymanabyssiidae
- Genus: Caymanabyssia
- Species: C. rhina

Binomial name
- Caymanabyssia rhina B.A. Marshall, 1986

Species of gastropod

Caymanabyssia rhina is a species of small sea snail, a marine gastropod mollusk in the family Caymanabyssiidae, the false limpets. The species has been verified to possess more defined threads and spine spacing on the teleoconch than other species of the genus.
