= Copulabyssia colombia =

Scientific classification
- Kingdom: Animalia
- Phylum: Mollusca
- Class: Gastropoda
- Subclass: Vetigastropoda
- Order: Lepetellida
- Family: Pseudococculinidae
- Genus: Copulabyssia
- Species: C. colombia

Binomial name
- Copulabyssia colombia Ardila & Harasewych, 2005

Species of gastropod

Copulabyssia colombia is a species of sea snail, a marine gastropod mollusk in the family Pseudococculinidae.

== Distribution ==
C. colombia is found on the Colombian coast of the Caribbean sea.

== Description ==
The maximum recorded shell length is 3.6 mm.

== Habitat ==
Minimum recorded depth is 300 m. Maximum recorded depth is 300 m.
