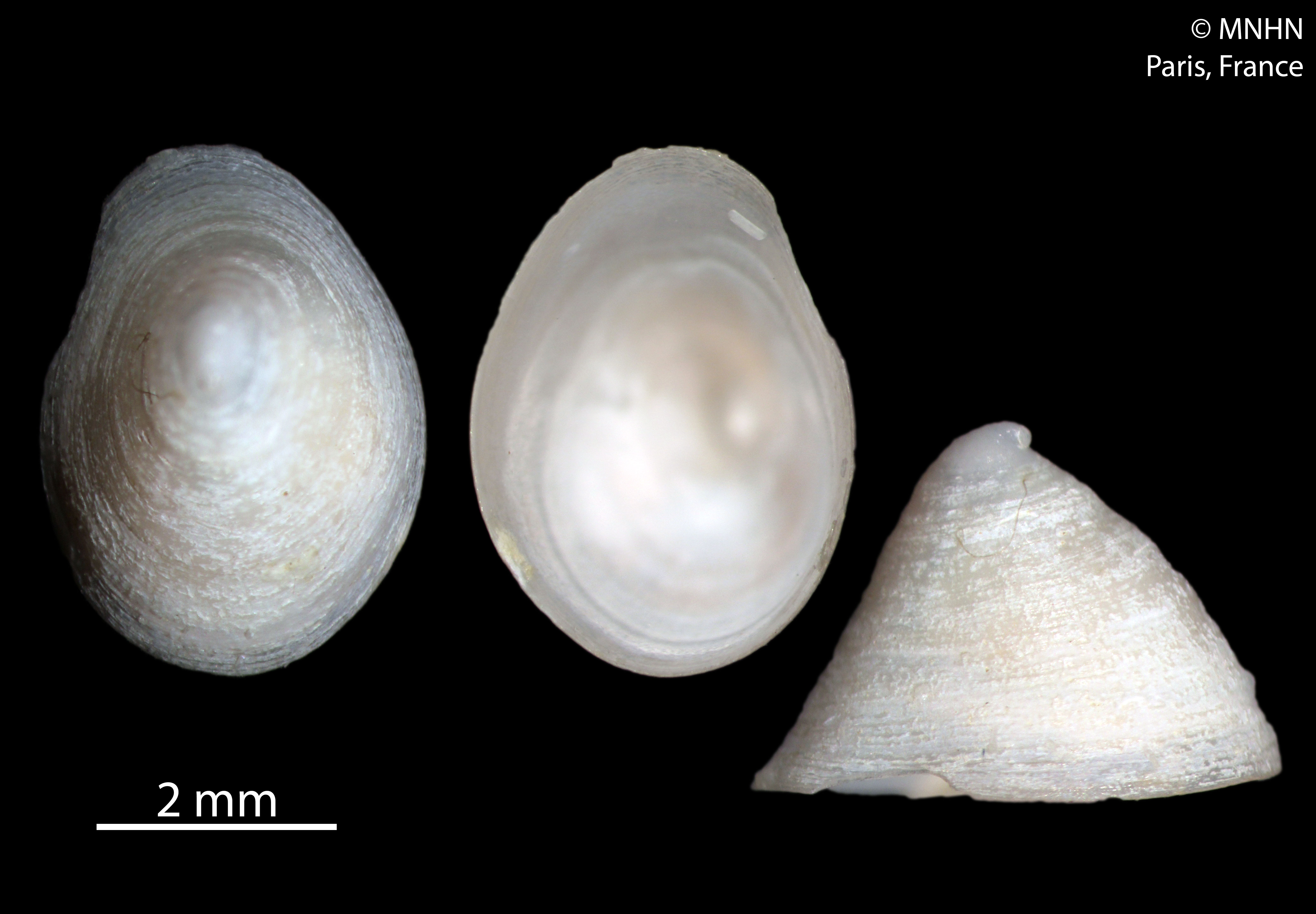
- Shell of Osteopelta praeceps (paratype at MNHN, Paris)

Scientific classification
- Kingdom: Animalia
- Phylum: Mollusca
- Class: Gastropoda
- Subclass: Vetigastropoda
- Order: Lepetellida
- Superfamily: Lepetelloidea
- Family: Osteopeltidae
- Genus: Osteopelta; Marshall, 1987

Type species
- Osteopelta mirabilis B.A. Marshall, 1987

= Osteopelta =

Genus of gastropods

Osteopelta is a genus of sea snails, marine gastropod mollusks in the family Osteopeltidae.

== Species ==
Species within the genus Osteopelta include:

- Osteopelta ceticola Warén, 1989
- Osteopelta huanyingae J. He, Z.-X. Qian & Y. Fang, 2017
- Osteopelta mirabilis Marshall, 1987
- Osteopelta praeceps B.A. Marshall, 1994
