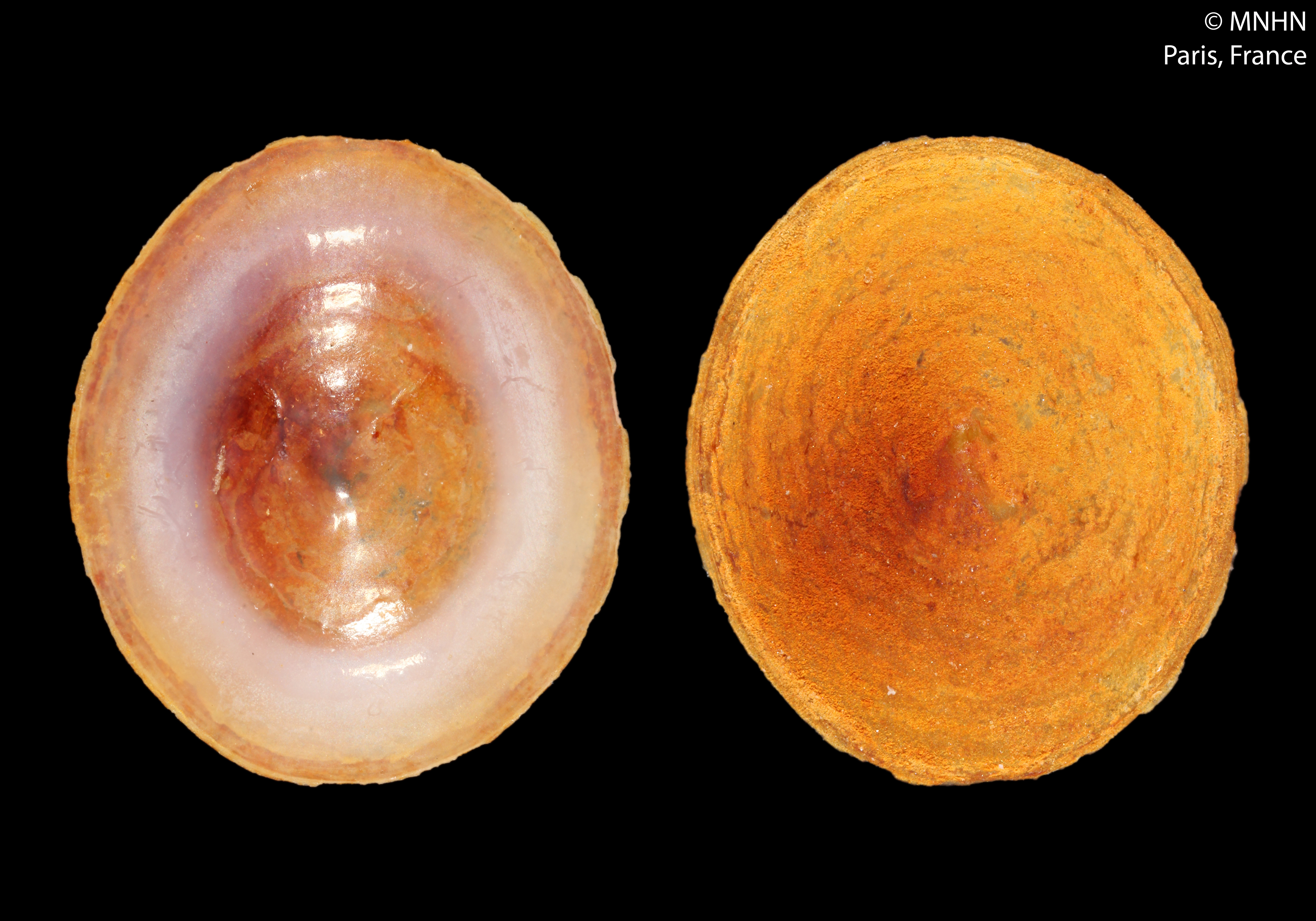
- Shell of Pyropelta sibuetae (holotype at MNHN, Paris)

Scientific classification
- Kingdom: Animalia
- Phylum: Mollusca
- Class: Gastropoda
- Subclass: Vetigastropoda
- Order: Lepetellida
- Family: Pyropeltidae
- Genus: Pyropelta
- Species: P. sibuetae

Binomial name
- Pyropelta sibuetae Warén & Bouchet, 2009

= Pyropelta sibuetae =

Species of gastropod

Pyropelta sibuetae is a species of small sea snail, a deep-water limpet, a marine gastropod mollusc in the family Pyropeltidae.

== Distribution ==
This small limpet occurs at methane seeps off the Congo River.
