= Copulabyssia similaris =

Scientific classification
- Kingdom: Animalia
- Phylum: Mollusca
- Class: Gastropoda
- Subclass: Vetigastropoda
- Order: Lepetellida
- Family: Pseudococculinidae
- Genus: Copulabyssia
- Species: C. similaris

Binomial name
- Copulabyssia similaris Hasegawa, 1997

Species of gastropod

Copulabyssia similaris is a species of small sea snail, a marine gastropod mollusk in the family Pseudococculinidae, the false limpets.

== Description ==
The shell grows to a size of 3 mm.

== Distribution ==
This species occurs in the Pacific Ocean off Japan.
