= Notocrater pustulosus =

Scientific classification
- Kingdom: Animalia
- Phylum: Mollusca
- Class: Gastropoda
- Subclass: Vetigastropoda
- Order: Lepetellida
- Superfamily: Lepetelloidea
- Family: Pseudococculinidae
- Genus: Notocrater
- Species: N. pustulosus

Binomial name
- Notocrater pustulosus (Thiele, 1925)

Synonyms
- Cocculina pustulosa Thiele, 1925 (original combination); Notocrater minutus (Habe, 1958); Punctolepeta minuta Habe, 1958 (original combination)

Species of gastropod

Notocrater pustulosus is a species of small sea snail, a marine gastropod mollusk in the family Pseudococculinidae, the false limpets.

== Distribution ==
This species occurs in the Pacific Ocean off Japan.
