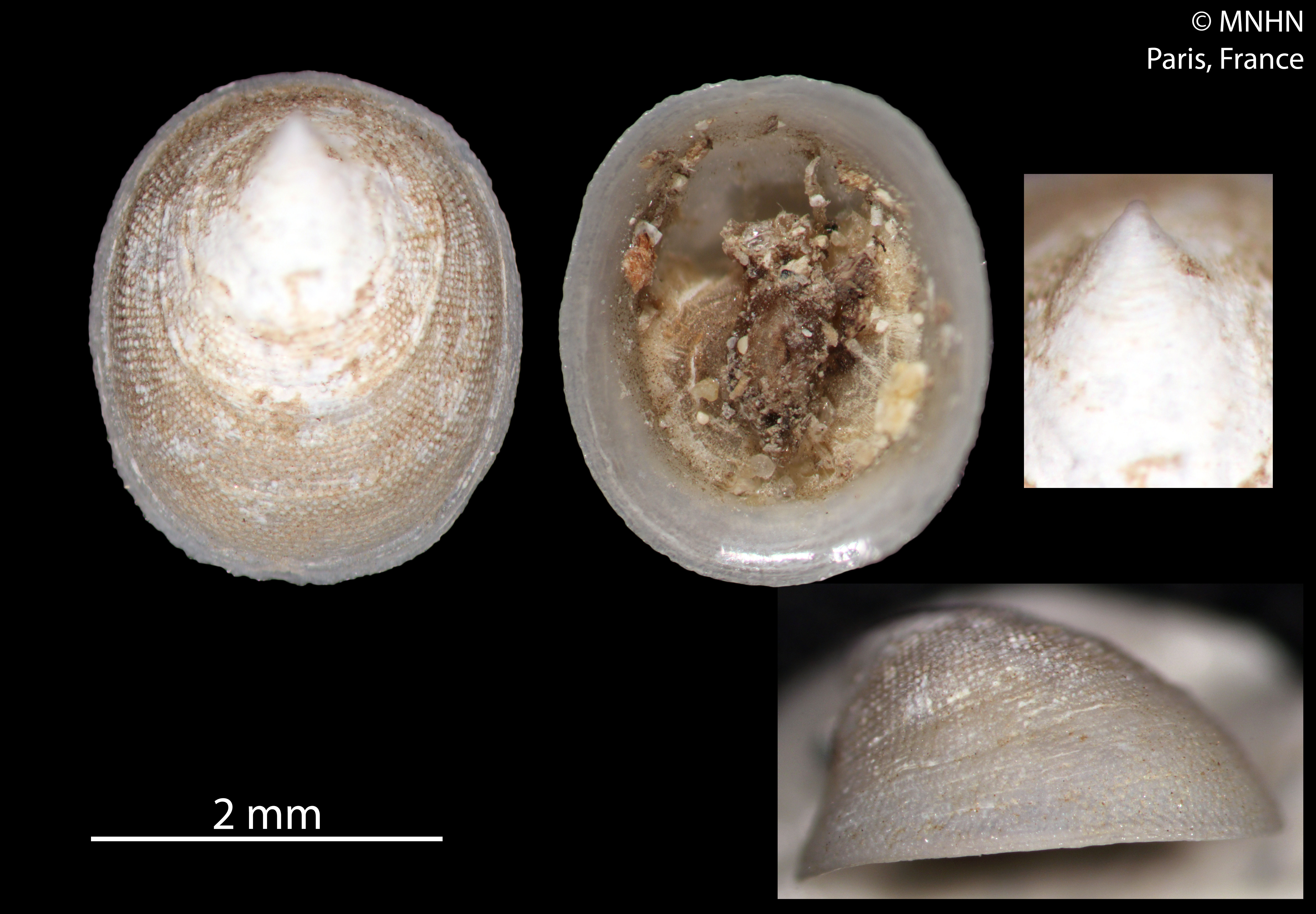
- Shell of Notocrater ponderi (paratype at MNHN, Paris)

Scientific classification
- Kingdom: Animalia
- Phylum: Mollusca
- Class: Gastropoda
- Subclass: Vetigastropoda
- Order: Lepetellida
- Superfamily: Lepetelloidea
- Family: Pseudococculinidae
- Genus: Notocrater; Finlay, 1927

Type species
- Cocculina craticulata Suter, 1908

Synonyms
- Punctolepeta Habe, 1958

= Notocrater =

Genus of gastropods

Notocrater is a genus of deep-water true limpets, marine gastropod molluscs in the family Pseudococculinidae, one of the families of true limpets.

Several species in this genus have two tentacles on each side of the body situated in the lateral grooves between foot and mantle

== Species ==
Species within the genus Notocrater include:

- Notocrater christofferseni Lima, 2014
- Notocrater craticulatus (Suter, 1908)
- Notocrater gracilis B.A. Marshall, 1986
- Notocrater houbricki McLean & Harasewych, 1995
- † Notocrater maxwelli B. A. Marshall, 1986
- Notocrater meridionalis (Hedley, 1903)
- Notocrater ponderi B.A. Marshall, 1986
- Notocrater pustulosus (Thiele, 1925)
- Notocrater youngi McLean & Harasewych, 1995

Species brought into synonymy

- Notocrater craticulata (Suter, 1908): synonym of Notocrater craticulatus (Suter, 1908)
- Notocrater minutus (Habe, 1958): synonym of Notocrater pustulosus (Thiele, 1925)
