= Mesopelex zelandica =

Scientific classification
- Kingdom: Animalia
- Phylum: Mollusca
- Class: Gastropoda
- Subclass: Vetigastropoda
- Order: Lepetellida
- Family: Pseudococculinidae
- Genus: Mesopelex
- Species: M. zelandica

Binomial name
- Mesopelex zelandica B.A. Marshall, 1986

Species of gastropod

Mesopelex zelandica is a species of small sea snail, a marine gastropod mollusk in the family Pseudococculinidae, the false limpets.

== Distribution ==
This marine species is endemic to New Zealand
