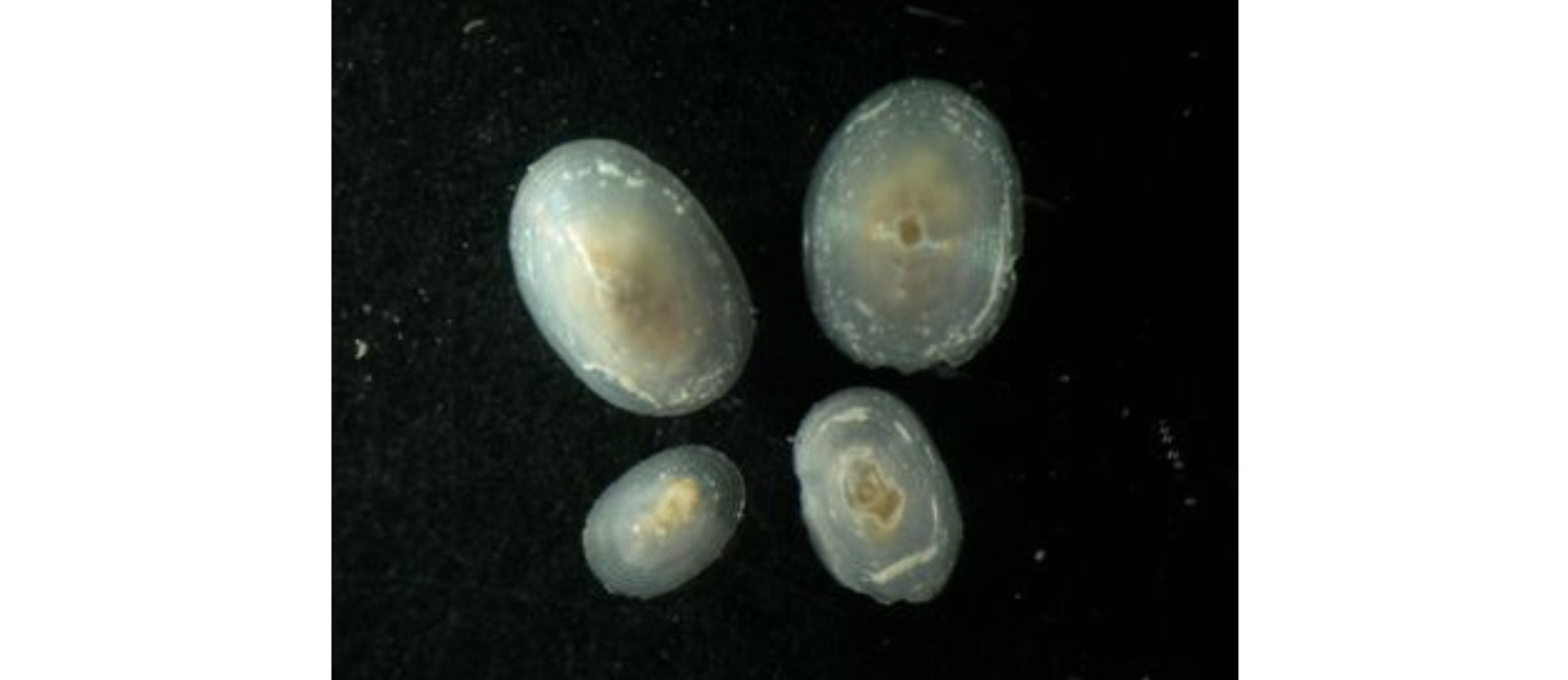
- Shell of Amphiplica gordensis

Scientific classification
- Kingdom: Animalia
- Phylum: Mollusca
- Class: Gastropoda
- Subclass: Vetigastropoda
- Order: Lepetellida
- Family: Pseudococculinidae
- Genus: Amphiplica
- Species: A. gordensis

Binomial name
- Amphiplica gordensis J. H. McLean, 1991

Synonyms
- Amphiplica (Gordabyssia) gordensis J. H. McLean, 1991 alternative representation

= Amphiplica gordensis =

Species of gastropod

Amphiplica gordensis is a species of sea snail, a marine gastropod mollusc in the family Pseudococculinidae.

== Description ==
The length of the shell attains 3.9 mm, its diameter 2.8 mm and its height 1.1 mm.

== Distribution ==
This abyssal occurs on the Escanaba Trough, Gorda Ridge, located roughly off the northern coast of California and southern Oregon
