= Cocculinella coercita =

Scientific classification
- Kingdom: Animalia
- Phylum: Mollusca
- Class: Gastropoda
- Subclass: Vetigastropoda
- Order: Lepetellida
- Superfamily: Lepetelloidea
- Family: Cocculinellidae
- Genus: Cocculinella
- Species: C. coercita

Binomial name
- Cocculinella coercita (Hedley, 1907)

Synonyms
- Cocculina coercita Hedley, 1907

Species of gastropod

Cocculinella coercita is a species of small, deep water sea snail, a marine gastropod mollusk in the family Cocculinellidae, the limpets.
