= Pyropelta oluae =

Scientific classification
- Kingdom: Animalia
- Phylum: Mollusca
- Class: Gastropoda
- Subclass: Vetigastropoda
- Order: Lepetellida
- Family: Pyropeltidae
- Genus: Pyropelta
- Species: P. oluae

Binomial name
- Pyropelta oluae Warén & Bouchet, 2009

Species of gastropod

Pyropelta oluae is a species of small sea snail, a deep-water limpet, a marine gastropod mollusk in the family Pyropeltidae.

== Distribution ==
This small impet occurs at methane seeps in deep water off the Congo River
