= C. oblonga =

C. oblonga may refer to:

- Callitris oblonga, a conifer species
- Cocculina oblonga, an orthogastropod mollusk species in the genus Cocculina
- Cydonia oblonga, a medicinal plant species

== See also ==
- Oblonga
