= Kaiparapelta askewi =

Scientific classification
- Kingdom: Animalia
- Phylum: Mollusca
- Class: Gastropoda
- Subclass: Vetigastropoda
- Order: Lepetellida
- Family: Pseudococculinidae
- Genus: Kaiparapelta
- Species: K. askewi

Binomial name
- Kaiparapelta askewi McLean & Harasewych, 1995

Species of gastropod

Kaiparapelta askewi is a species of sea snail, a marine gastropod mollusk in the family Pseudococculinidae.

== Distribution ==
This species occurs in the Atlantic Ocean from South Carolina, USA to Madeira

== Description ==
The maximum recorded shell length is 2.7 mm.

== Habitat ==
Minimum recorded depth is 194 m. Maximum recorded depth is 194 m.
