= Pseudococculina rimula =

Scientific classification
- Kingdom: Animalia
- Phylum: Mollusca
- Class: Gastropoda
- Subclass: Vetigastropoda
- Order: Lepetellida
- Family: Pseudococculinidae
- Genus: Pseudococculina
- Species: P. rimula

Binomial name
- Pseudococculina rimula Simone & Cunha, 2003

Species of gastropod

Pseudococculina rimula is a species of sea snail, a marine gastropod mollusc in the family Pseudococculinidae.

== Distribution ==
This species occurs in the Atlantic Ocean off Southeast Brazil.

== Description ==
The maximum recorded length of the white, patelliform shell is 3.3 mm.

== Habitat ==
Minimum recorded depth is 350 m. Maximum recorded depth is 400 m.
