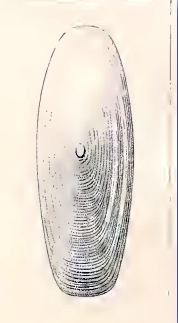
- Drawing with an apical view of the shell of Cocculinella minutissima

Scientific classification
- Kingdom: Animalia
- Phylum: Mollusca
- Class: Gastropoda
- Subclass: Vetigastropoda
- Order: Lepetellida
- Superfamily: Lepetelloidea
- Family: Cocculinellidae
- Genus: Cocculinella
- Species: C. minutissima

Binomial name
- Cocculinella minutissima (E. A. Smith, 1904)

Synonyms
- Acmaea minutissima E. A. Smith, 1904

= Cocculinella minutissima =

Species of gastropod

Cocculinella minutissima is a species of small, deep water sea snail, a marine gastropod mollusk in the family Cocculinellidae, the limpets.

== Description ==
The shell grows to a size of 3.5 mm, width 1.5 mm and height 1 mm. The thin, white shell is long and narrow with growth rings. The sides are almost parallel, slightly bent, slightly truncated at the back. The nipple-shaped apex stands out and drops quite sharply backwards. It is located about in front of the center. The front drops in a straight line and is slightly convex at the rear.

== Distribution ==
This marine species occurs in the Pacific Ocean off Japan and in the Indian Ocean off the Andaman Islands.
