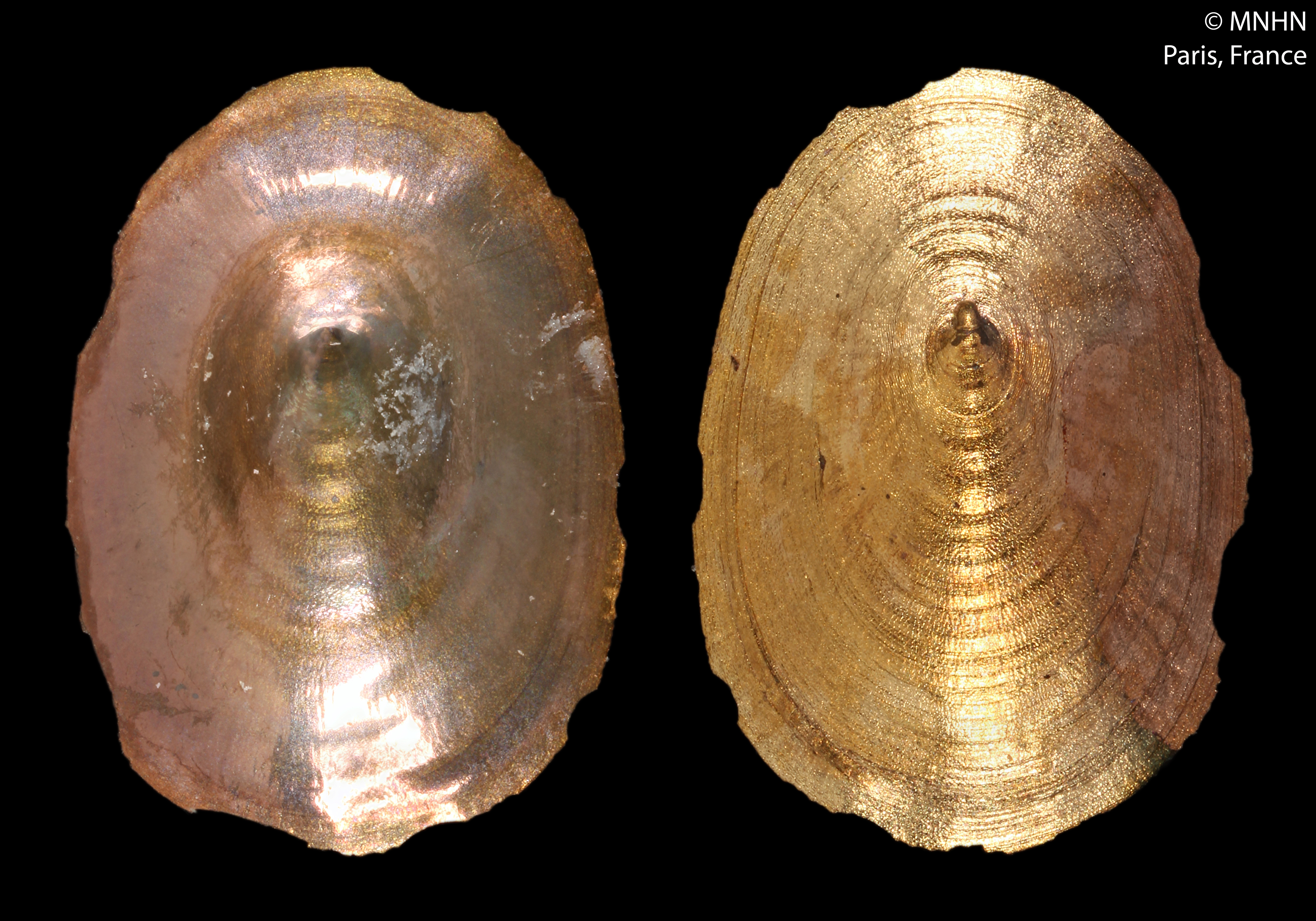
- Tentaoculus granulatus

Scientific classification
- Kingdom: Animalia
- Phylum: Mollusca
- Class: Gastropoda
- Subclass: Vetigastropoda
- Order: Lepetellida
- Superfamily: Lepetelloidea
- Family: Pseudococculinidae
- Genus: Tentaoculus; Moskalev, 1976

Type species
- Tentaoculus perlucidus Moskalev, 1976

= Tentaoculus =

Genus of gastropods

Tentaoculus is a genus of sea snails, deep-sea false limpets, marine gastropod mollusks in the family Pseudococculinidae.

== Species ==
Species within the genus Tentaoculus include:

- Tentaoculus balantiophaga B.A. Marshall, 1996
- Tentaoculus eritmetus (A. E. Verrill, 1884)
- Tentaoculus georgianus (Dall, 1927)
- Tentaoculus granulatus Warén & Bouchet, 2009
- Tentaoculus haptricola B.A. Marshall, 1986
- Tentaoculus lithodicola B.A. Marshall, 1986
- Tentaoculus neolithodicola B.A. Marshall, 1986
- Tentaoculus perlucidus Moskalev, 1976
