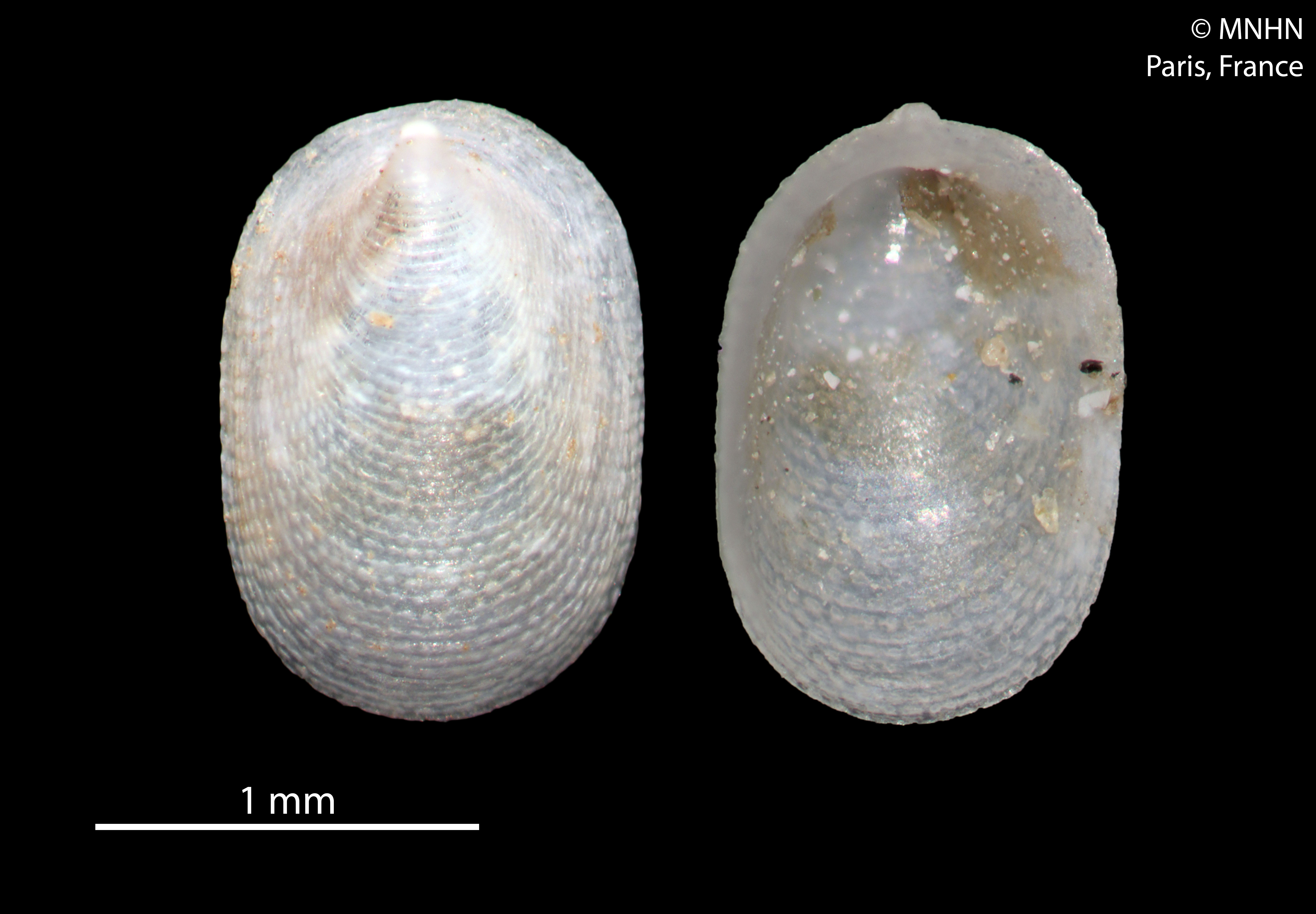
- Shell of Notocrater gracilis (paratype at MNHN, Paris)

Scientific classification
- Kingdom: Animalia
- Phylum: Mollusca
- Class: Gastropoda
- Subclass: Vetigastropoda
- Order: Lepetellida
- Family: Pseudococculinidae
- Genus: Notocrater
- Species: N. gracilis

Binomial name
- Notocrater gracilis B.A. Marshall, 1986

= Notocrater gracilis =

Species of gastropod

Notocrater gracilis is a species of small sea snail, a marine gastropod mollusk in the family Pseudococculinidae, the false limpets.

== Distribution ==
This marine species is endemic to New Zealand.
