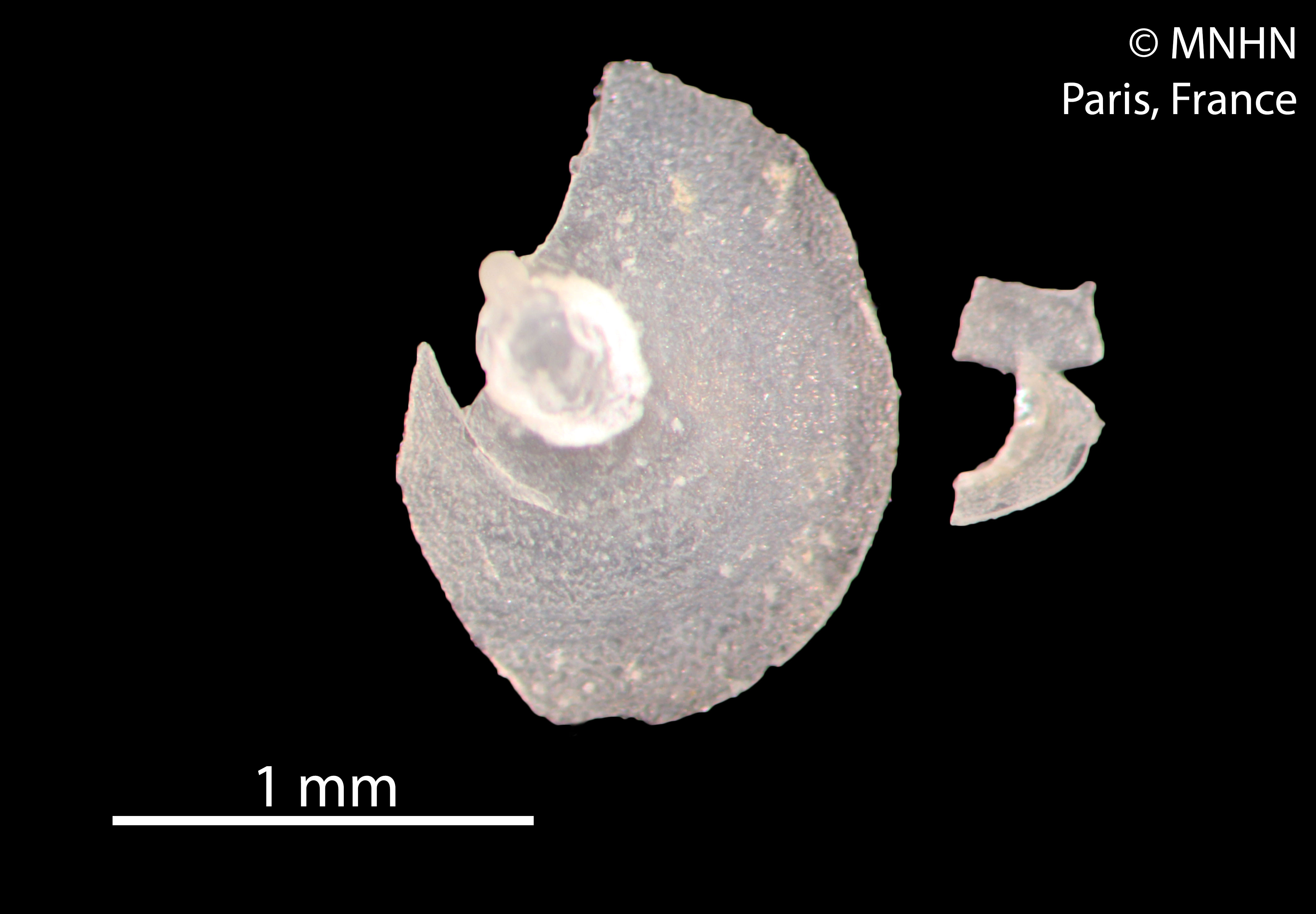
- Shell of Caymanabyssia sinespina (paratype at MNHN, Paris)

Scientific classification
- Kingdom: Animalia
- Phylum: Mollusca
- Class: Gastropoda
- Subclass: Vetigastropoda
- Order: Lepetellida
- Superfamily: Lepetelloidea
- Family: Caymanabyssiidae
- Genus: Caymanabyssia; Moskalev, 1976

Synonyms
- Caymanabyssia (Caymanabyssia) Moskalev, 1976· accepted, alternate representation; Caymanabyssia (Dictyabyssia) McLean, 1991· accepted, alternate representation

= Caymanabyssia =

Genus of gastropods

Caymanabyssia is a genus of small sea snails, marine gastropod mollusks in the family Caymanabyssiidae, the false limpets.

== Species ==
Species within the genus Caymanabyssia include:

- Caymanabyssia fosteri McLean, 1991
- Caymanabyssia rhina B.A. Marshall, 1986
- Caymanabyssia sinespina B.A. Marshall, 1986
- Caymanabyssia solis Kano, Takano, Schwabe & Warén, 2016
- Caymanabyssia spina Moskalev, 1976
- Caymanabyssia vandoverae McLean, 1991
