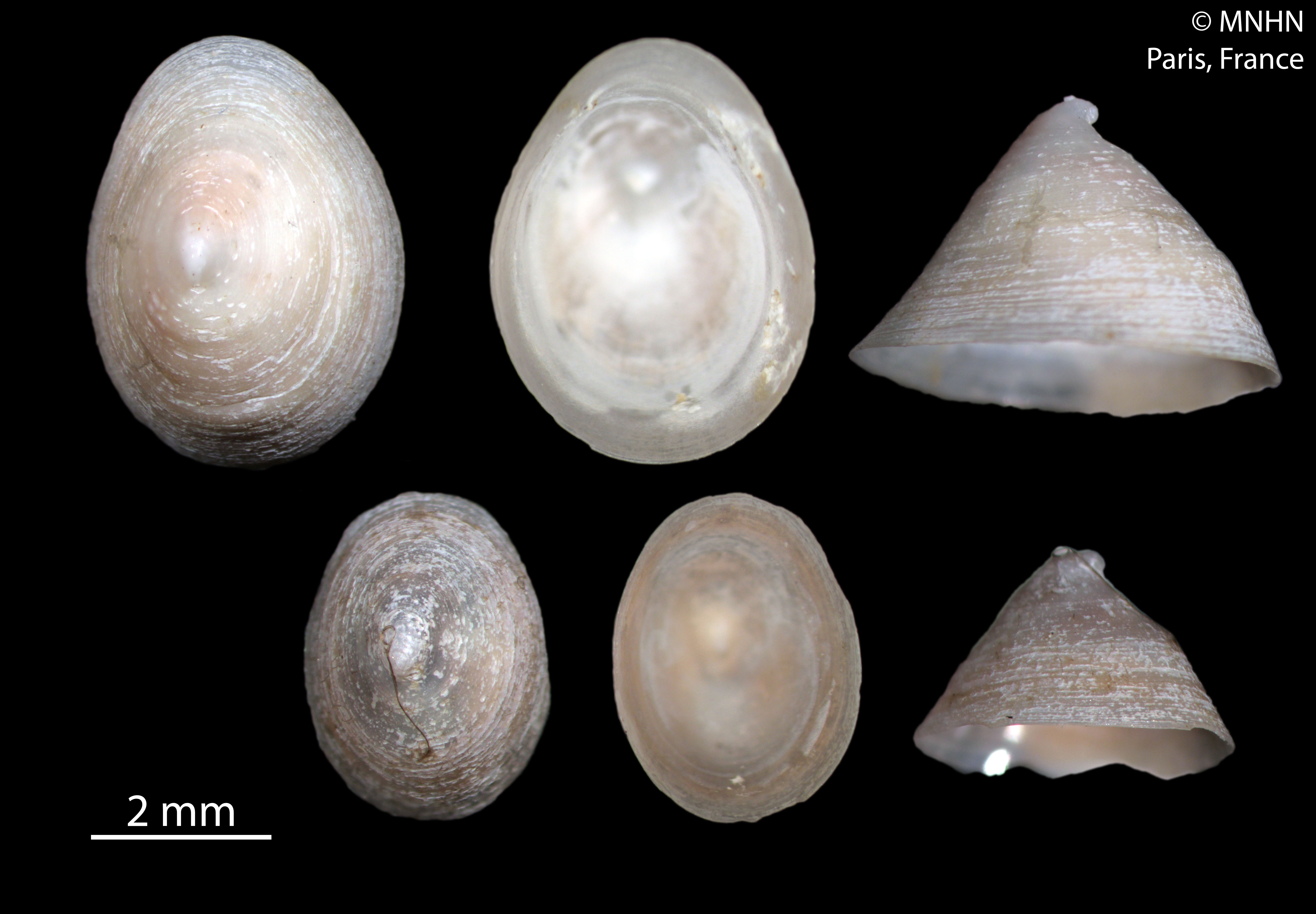

Scientific classification
- Kingdom: Animalia
- Phylum: Mollusca
- Class: Gastropoda
- Subclass: Vetigastropoda
- Order: Lepetellida
- Superfamily: Lepetelloidea
- Family: Osteopeltidae
- Genus: Osteopelta
- Species: O. praeceps

Binomial name
- Osteopelta praeceps B.A. Marshall, 1994

= Osteopelta praeceps =

Species of gastropod

Osteopelta praeceps is a species of small, deep water sea snail, a marine gastropod mollusk in the family Osteopeltidae.

== Distribution ==
This marine species is endemic to New Zealand.
