= Cocculina craigsmithi =

Scientific classification
- Kingdom: Animalia
- Phylum: Mollusca
- Class: Gastropoda
- Subclass: Vetigastropoda
- Family: Cocculinidae
- Genus: Cocculina
- Species: C. craigsmithi

Binomial name
- Cocculina craigsmithi McLean, 1992

Species of Cocculinidae limpet

Cocculina craigsmithi is a species of deep-sea limpet in the family Cocculinidae, thus far only known from whale-falls.
