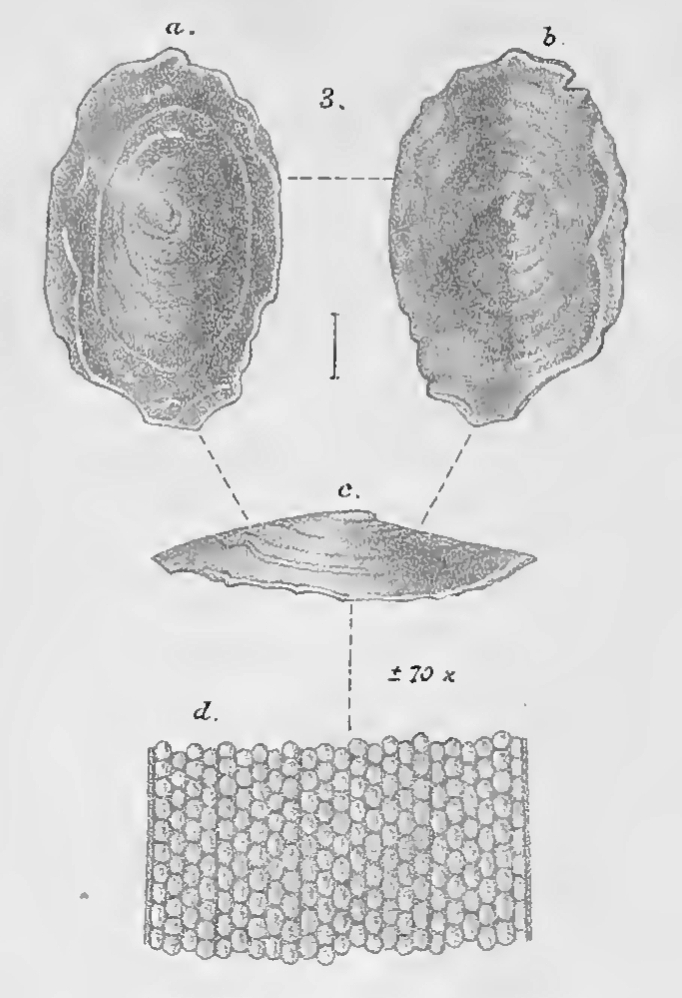
- Original drawing with several views of Pseudococculina granulata

Scientific classification
- Kingdom: Animalia
- Phylum: Mollusca
- Class: Gastropoda
- Subclass: Vetigastropoda
- Order: Lepetellida
- Superfamily: Lepetelloidea
- Family: Pseudococculinidae
- Genus: Pseudococculina
- Species: P. granulata

Binomial name
- Pseudococculina granulata Schepman, 1908

= Pseudococculina granulata =

Species of gastropod

Pseudococculina granulata is a species of small sea snail, a marine gastropod mollusk in the family Pseudococculinidae, the false limpets.

== Description ==
The small, white shell is oval and depressed. It is very thin. It grows to a length of 5½ mm. The shell is broader towards the front, the ends are slightly raised. The front and side-slopes are slightly convex. The posterior slope is nearly straight, with a very small impression below the nucleus, This nucleus is smooth, compressed, subspiral, placed at a little more than 6/11 of the total length of the shell. The sculpture consists of a few concentric striae. Moreover, the whole surface is covered by very small, crowded granules of an irregular oval, potatolike shape. Sometimes two or three granules are confluent. They are placed in oblique rows. The inside of the shell is smooth.

The rhachidian tooth of the radula has an oblong shape, with convex sides towards the middle, and concave towards the top, with a slightly reflected margin. The upper margin lacks a cusp, and is irregularly convex. About the centre of this tooth is an irregular spot that seems to be thickened and slightly coloured. The first lateral tooth has a subtriangular shape, with a thickened or reflected upper margin. It is followed by three laterals with a simple cusp. The outermost lateral is so much concealed by the large uncini, that its shape could not be traced. It seems to have a simple cusp, without the sharp denticle of the preceding species. The proximal uncini are strongly hooked and simple. The median ones seem to be serrated and the exterior one again simple.

== Distribution ==
This marine species occurs in the Indo-Australian archipelago.
