= Kurilabyssia antipodensis =

Scientific classification
- Kingdom: Animalia
- Phylum: Mollusca
- Class: Gastropoda
- Subclass: Vetigastropoda
- Order: Lepetellida
- Family: Pseudococculinidae
- Genus: Kurilabyssia
- Species: K. antipodensis

Binomial name
- Kurilabyssia antipodensis B.A. Marshall, 1986

Species of gastropod

Kurilabyssia antipodensis is a species of small sea snail, a marine gastropod mollusk in the family Pseudococculinidae, the false limpets.

== Distribution ==
This marine species is endemic to New Zealand.
