= Coccopigya lata =

Scientific classification
- Kingdom: Animalia
- Phylum: Mollusca
- Class: Gastropoda
- Subclass: Vetigastropoda
- Family: Cocculinidae
- Genus: Coccopigya
- Species: C. lata

Binomial name
- Coccopigya lata (Warén, 1996)

Species of gastropod

Coccopigya lata is a species of sea snail, deep-sea limpet, a marine gastropod mollusk in the family Cocculinidae.

== Distribution ==
European waters
