= Macleaniella =

Scientific classification
- Kingdom: Animalia
- Phylum: Mollusca
- Class: Gastropoda
- Subclass: Vetigastropoda
- Family: Cocculinidae
- Genus: Macleaniella; Leal & Harasewych, 1999
- Species: M. moskalevi

Binomial name
- Macleaniella moskalevi Leal & Harasewych, 1999

Genus of gastropods

Macleaniella is a genus of deep-sea limpets in the family Cocculinidae.

== Species ==
Species within the genus Macleaniella include:

- Macleaniella moskalevi Leal & Harasewych, 1999

== Distribution ==
Macleaniella moskalevi is endemic to Puerto Rico Trench.

== Description ==
The shell of Macleaniella moskalevi is small and cap-shaped. The maximum recorded shell length is 5.17 mm.

== Habitat ==
Minimum recorded depth is 5184 m. Maximum recorded depth is 8595 m.

== Life cycle ==
Simultaneous hermaphrodites.
