= Fedikovella beanii =

Scientific classification
- Kingdom: Animalia
- Phylum: Mollusca
- Class: Gastropoda
- Subclass: Vetigastropoda
- Family: Cocculinidae
- Genus: Fedikovella
- Species: F. beanii

Binomial name
- Fedikovella beanii (Dall, 1882)

Species of gastropod

Fedikovella beanii is a species of sea snail, deep-sea limpet, a marine gastropod mollusk in the family Cocculinidae.

== Description ==
The maximum recorded shell length is 7.2 mm.

== Habitat ==
Minimum recorded depth is 210 m. Maximum recorded depth is 1483 m.
