= Cocculina messingi =

Scientific classification
- Kingdom: Animalia
- Phylum: Mollusca
- Class: Gastropoda
- Subclass: Vetigastropoda
- Family: Cocculinidae
- Genus: Cocculina
- Species: C. messingi

Binomial name
- Cocculina messingi McLean & Harasewych, 1995

Species of gastropod

Cocculina messingi is a species of sea snail, deep-sea limpet, a marine gastropod mollusk in the family Cocculinidae.

== Distribution ==
Colombia: Caribbean Sea

== Description ==
The maximum recorded shell length is 10.9 mm.

== Habitat ==
Minimum recorded depth is 282 m. Maximum recorded depth is 412 m.
