= Copulabyssia tenuis =

Scientific classification
- Kingdom: Animalia
- Phylum: Mollusca
- Class: Gastropoda
- Subclass: Vetigastropoda
- Order: Lepetellida
- Family: Pseudococculinidae
- Genus: Copulabyssia
- Species: C. tenuis

Binomial name
- Copulabyssia tenuis (Monterosato, 1880)

Synonyms
- Cocculina corrugata Jeffreys, 1883 (original combination); Copulabyssia corrugata (Jeffreys, 1883); Propilidium pertenue Jeffreys, 1883

Species of gastropod

Copulabyssia tenuis is a species of sea snail, a marine gastropod mollusk in the family Pseudococculinidae.

== Description ==
The size of the shell varies between 0.7 mm and 2.6 mm.

== Distribution ==
This marine species occurs in the Atlantic Ocean from the Faroes to Madeira; in the Mediterranean Sea.
