= Coccopigya viminensis =

Scientific classification
- Kingdom: Animalia
- Phylum: Mollusca
- Class: Gastropoda
- Subclass: Vetigastropoda
- Family: Cocculinidae
- Genus: Coccopigya
- Species: C. viminensis

Binomial name
- Coccopigya viminensis (Rocchini, 1990)

Species of gastropod

Coccopigya viminensis is a species of sea snail, deep-sea limpet, a marine gastropod mollusk in the family Cocculinidae.

== Distribution ==
The type locality is "Tuscan Sea" (Tuscan Archipelago) in depths 450–500 m.
