= Pedococculina =

Scientific classification
- Kingdom: Animalia
- Phylum: Mollusca
- Class: Gastropoda
- Subclass: Vetigastropoda
- Family: Cocculinidae
- Genus: Pedococculina; Haszprunar, Wendler, Jöst, Ruthensteiner & Heß, 2022
- Species: P. cervae

Binomial name
- Pedococculina cervae (C. A. Fleming, 1948)

Synonyms
- Cocculina cervae C. A. Fleming, 1948; Paracocculina cervae (C. A. Fleming, 1948); Tecticrater cervae (C. A. Fleming, 1948)

Species of gastropod

Pedococculina is a monotypic genus of very small deepwater limpet, a marine gastropod mollusc in the family Cocculinidae. Its sole species is Pedococculina cervae.
