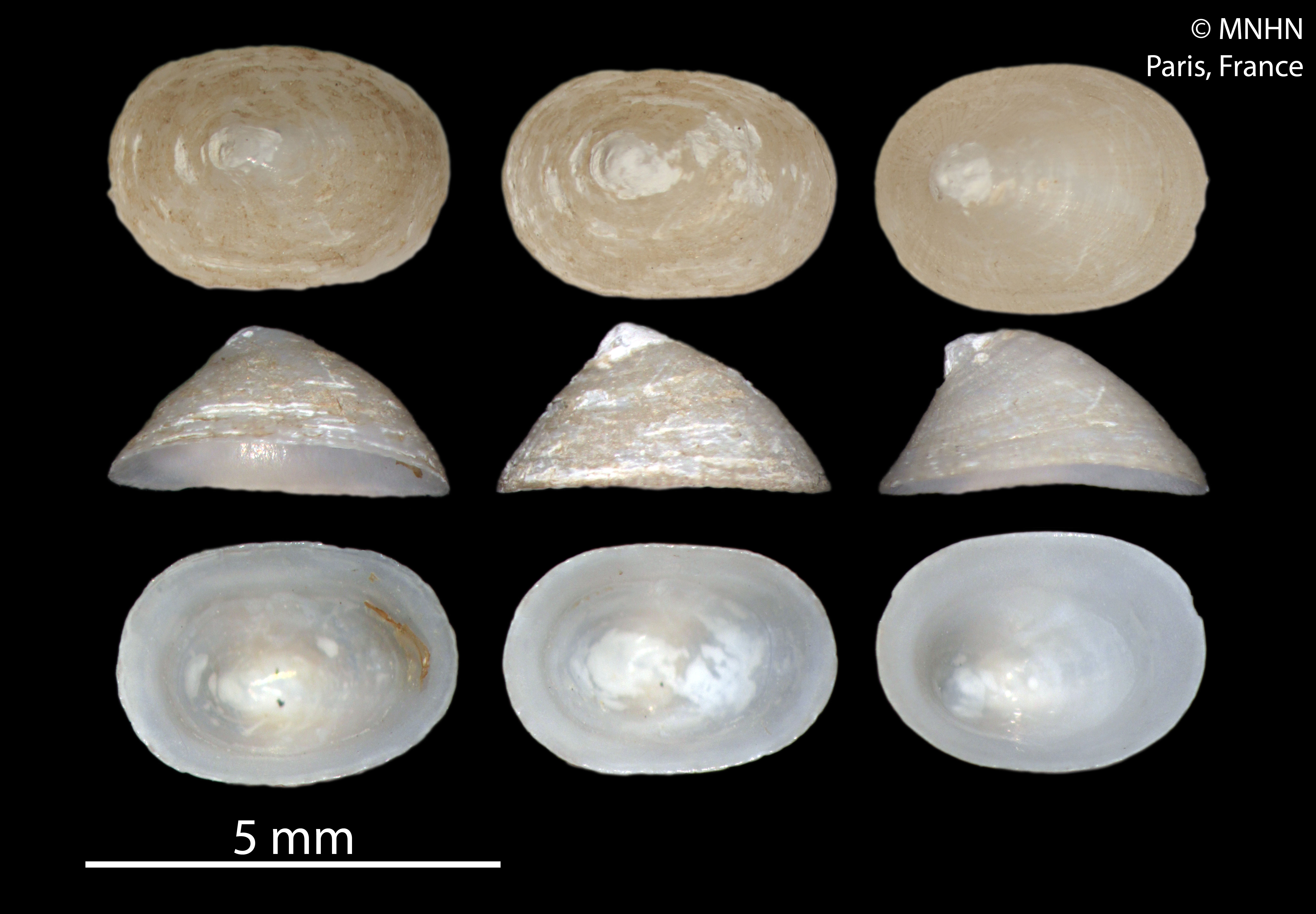
- Coccopigya crinita

Scientific classification
- Kingdom: Animalia
- Phylum: Mollusca
- Class: Gastropoda
- Subclass: Vetigastropoda
- Family: Cocculinidae
- Genus: Coccopigya; Marshall, 1986

= Coccopigya =

Genus of gastropods

Coccopigya is a genus of sea snails, deep-sea limpets, marine gastropod mollusks in the family Cocculinidae.

== Species ==
Species within the genus Coccopigya include:

- Coccopigya barbatula B. A. Marshall, 1986
- † Coccopigya compuncta (Marwick, 1931)
- Coccopigya crebrilamina B. A. Marshall, 1986
- Coccopigya crinita B. A. Marshall, 1986
- Coccopigya hispida B. A. Marshall, 1986
- † Coccopigya komitica B. A. Marshall, 1986
- Coccopigya lata (Warén, 1996)
- Coccopigya mikkelsenae McLean & Harasewych, 1995
- Coccopigya oculifera B. A. Marshall, 1986
- Coccopigya okutanii Hasegawa, 1997
- † Coccopigya otaiana B. A. Marshall, 1986
- Coccopigya punctoradiata (Kuroda & Habe, 1949)
- Coccopigya spinigera (Jeffreys, 1883)
- Coccopigya viminensis (Rocchini, 1990)
