= Kaiparapelta =

Scientific classification
- Kingdom: Animalia
- Phylum: Mollusca
- Class: Gastropoda
- Subclass: Vetigastropoda
- Order: Lepetellida
- Family: Pseudococculinidae
- Genus: Kaiparapelta; Marshall, 1986

Genus of gastropods

Kaiparapelta is a genus of sea snails, marine gastropod mollusks in the family Pseudococculinidae. The genus has traditionally been classified as belonging to the Pseudococculinidae family, but as of 2013, molecular data indicate that this family is a non-monophyletic group, and the phylogenic position of this genus remains unsettled.

== Species ==
Species within the genus Kaiparapelta include:

- Kaiparapelta askewi McLean & Harasewych, 1995
- † Kaiparapelta singularis B. A. Marshall, 1986
