= Copulabyssia =

Scientific classification
- Kingdom: Animalia
- Phylum: Mollusca
- Class: Gastropoda
- Subclass: Vetigastropoda
- Order: Lepetellida
- Family: Pseudococculinidae
- Genus: Copulabyssia; Haszprunar, 1988

Genus of gastropods

Copulabyssia is a genus of sea snails, marine gastropod mollusks in the family Pseudococculinidae.

== Species ==
Species within the genus Copulabyssia include:

- Copulabyssia colombia Ardila & Harasewych, 2005
- Copulabyssia gradata (B. A. Marshall, 1986)
- Copulabyssia leptalea (A. E. Verrill, 1884)
- Copulabyssia riosi Leal & Simone, 2000
- Copulabyssia similaris Hasegawa, 1997
- Copulabyssia tenuis (Monterosato, 1880)

Species brought into synonymy

- Copulabyssia corrugata (Jeffreys, 1883): synonym of Copulabyssia tenuis (Monterosato, 1880)
