= Fedikovella =

Scientific classification
- Kingdom: Animalia
- Phylum: Mollusca
- Class: Gastropoda
- Subclass: Vetigastropoda
- Family: Cocculinidae
- Genus: Fedikovella; Moskalev, 1976

Genus of gastropods

Fedikovella is a genus of sea snails, deep-sea limpets, marine gastropod mollusks in the family Cocculinidae.

== Species ==
Species within the genus Fedikovella include:

- Fedikovella beanii (Dall, 1882)
- Fedikovella caymanensis Moskalev, 1976
