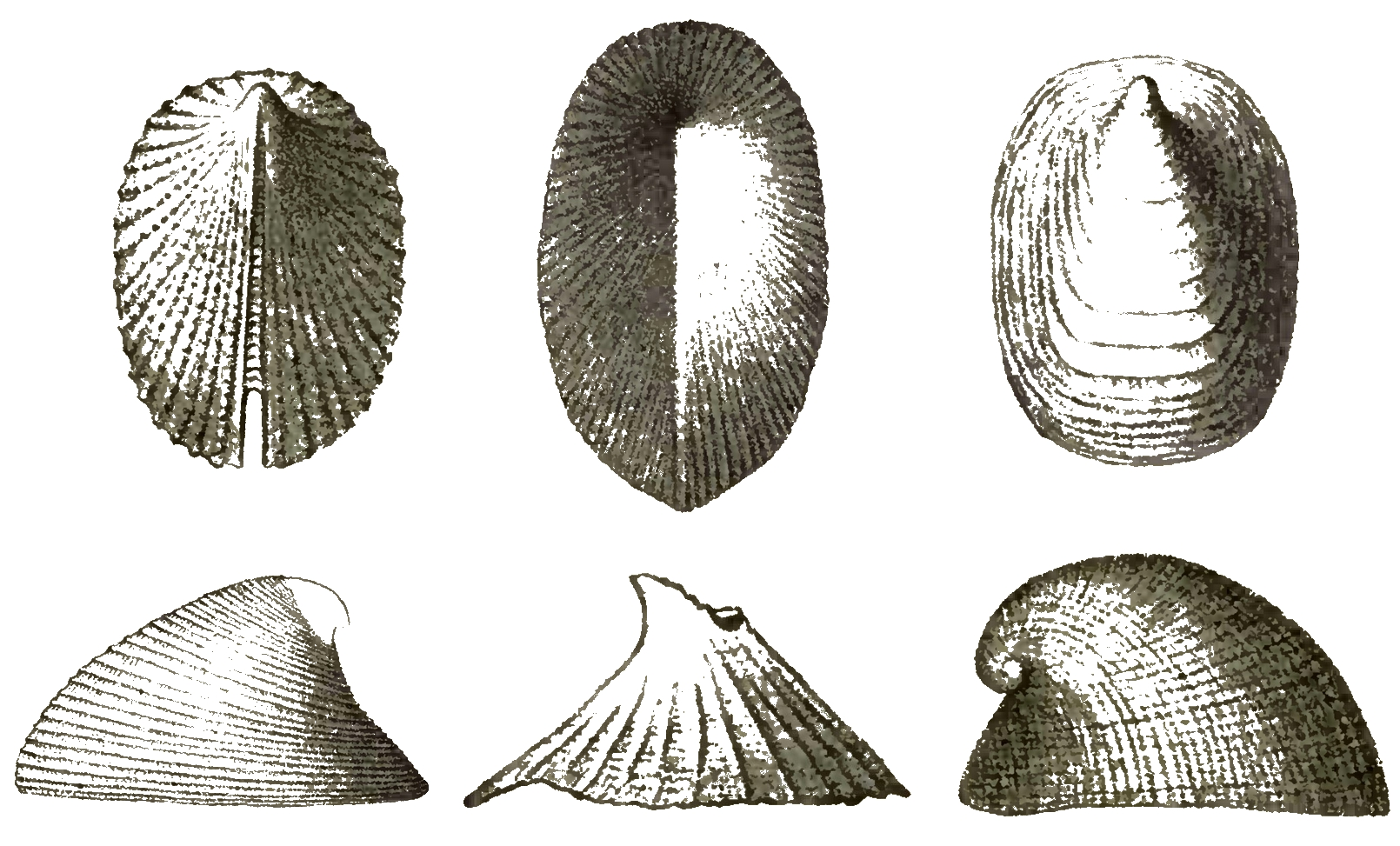
- Shells of various Cocculinidae species

Scientific classification
- Kingdom: Animalia
- Phylum: Mollusca
- Class: Gastropoda
- Subclass: Vetigastropoda
- Superfamily: Cocculinoidea
- Family: Cocculinidae; Dall, 1882

Diversity
- 43 extant species, at least 4 fossil species

= Cocculinidae =

Family of gastropods

Cocculinidae is a family of sea snails, deep-sea limpets, marine gastropod mollusks in the superfamily Cocculinoidea.

== Genera ==
Genera within the family Cocculinidae include:

- Genus Coccocrater Haszprunar, 1987
  - Coccocrater pocillum
  - Coccocrater portoricensis (Dall & Simpson, 1901)
- Genus Coccopigya Marshall, 1986
  - Coccopigya barbatula
  - Coccopigya crebriflamina
  - Coccopigya crebrilamina
  - Coccopigya crinita
  - Coccopigya hispida
  - Coccopigya lata (Warén, 1996)
  - Coccopigya mikkelsenae
  - Coccopigya oculifera
  - Coccopigya okutanii
  - Coccopigya punctoradiata (Kuroda & Habe, 1949)
  - Coccopigya spinigera (Jeffreys, 1883)
  - Coccopigya viminensis (Rocchini, 1990)
- Genus Cocculina Dall, 1882
  - Cocculina adunca
  - Cocculina alveolata
  - Cocculina angulata
  - Cocculina cingulina
  - Cocculina emsoni McLean & Harasewych, 1995
  - Cocculina fenestrata Ardila & Harasewych, 2005
  - Cocculina japonica
  - Cocculina leptalea A. E. Verrill, 1884
  - Cocculina leptoglypta Dautzenberg & H. Fischer, 1897
  - Cocculina mamilla
  - Cocculina messingi McLean & Harasewych, 1995
  - Cocculina oblonga
  - Cocculina ovata
  - Cocculina pacifica
  - Cocculina rathbuni
  - Cocculina striata
  - Cocculina subcompressa
  - Cocculina subquadrata
  - Cocculina surugaensis
  - Cocculina tenuitesta
  - Cocculina tosaensis
- Genus Fedikovella Moskalev, 1976
  - Fedikovella beanii (Dall, 1882)
  - Fedikovella caymanensis
- Genus Macleaniella Leal & Harasewych 1999
  - Macleaniella moskalevi Leal & Harasewych, 1999
- Genus Paracocculina Haszprunar, 1987
  - Paracocculina cervae
  - Paracocculina laevis
- Genus Pedococculina Haszprunar, Wendler, Jöst, Ruthensteiner & Heß, 2022
  - Pedococculina cervae (C. A. Fleming, 1948)
- Teuthirostria Moskalev, 1976
