= Cocculina fenestrata =

Scientific classification
- Kingdom: Animalia
- Phylum: Mollusca
- Class: Gastropoda
- Subclass: Vetigastropoda
- Family: Cocculinidae
- Genus: Cocculina
- Species: C. fenestrata

Binomial name
- Cocculina fenestrata Ardila & Harasewych, 2005

Species of gastropod

Cocculina fenestrata is a species of sea snail, deep-sea limpet, a marine gastropod mollusk in the family Cocculinidae.

== Distribution ==
Colombia: continental slope of Caribbean Sea

== Description ==
The maximum recorded shell length is 3.3 mm.

== Habitat ==
Minimum recorded depth is 504 m. Maximum recorded depth is 504 m.
