= Copulabyssia gradata =

Scientific classification
- Kingdom: Animalia
- Phylum: Mollusca
- Class: Gastropoda
- Subclass: Vetigastropoda
- Order: Lepetellida
- Family: Pseudococculinidae
- Genus: Copulabyssia
- Species: C. gradata

Binomial name
- Copulabyssia gradata (B. A. Marshall, 1986)

Synonyms
- Pseudococculina gradata B.A. Marshall, 1986

Species of gastropod

Copulabyssia gradata is a species of small sea snail, a marine gastropod mollusk in the family Pseudococculinidae, the false limpets.

== Distribution ==
This marine species is endemic to New Zealand.
