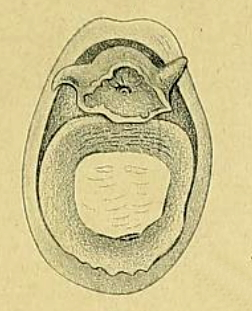
- Underside of the shell showing the animal of Amphiplica concentrica

Scientific classification
- Kingdom: Animalia
- Phylum: Mollusca
- Class: Gastropoda
- Subclass: Vetigastropoda
- Order: Lepetellida
- Family: Pseudococculinidae
- Genus: Amphiplica
- Species: A. concentrica

Binomial name
- Amphiplica concentrica (Thiele, 1909)

Synonyms
- Pseudocculina concentrica Thiele 1909 (basionym)

= Amphiplica concentrica =

Species of gastropod

Amphiplica concentrica is a species of sea snail, a marine gastropod mollusc in the family Pseudococculinidae.

== Description ==
The shell measures 9.5 mm in length, 7 mm in diameter, and 2.75 mm in height.

The microsculpture of the protoconch consists of prismatic crystals. It has one or several gill leaflets on the left side of the soft body.

(Original description in German) The shell is white and egg-shaped, appearing rather low, with the apex being situated somewhat behind the middle, inclined backwards and hookedly curved inwards. Towards the front, it slopes gradually and somewhat convexly, while towards the back, it slopes steeply and distinctly concavely. The entire nucleus is smooth and somewhat sunken. The slope of the remaining shell is slightly convex towards the front and sides, and straight towards the back. The sculpture consists of equally spaced, regular concentric folds that suddenly decrease after the middle. With a good magnifying glass, one can observe very fine radially running threads between these folds. The margin is sharp, and the inside is smooth with a faint muscle scar.

== Distribution ==
This species occurs in the Atlantic Ocean, north off the Azores.
