= Notocrater craticulatus =

Scientific classification
- Kingdom: Animalia
- Phylum: Mollusca
- Class: Gastropoda
- Subclass: Vetigastropoda
- Order: Lepetellida
- Family: Pseudococculinidae
- Genus: Notocrater
- Species: N. craticulatus

Binomial name
- Notocrater craticulatus (Suter, 1908)

Synonyms
- Cocculina craticulata Suter, 1908; Notocrater craticulata (Suter, 1908) (incorrect gender ending (crater is masculine))

Species of gastropod

Notocrater craticulatus is a southern, cold-water, deepwater species of limpet, a marine gastropod mollusc in the family Pseudococculinidae, one of the families of false limpets.

== Distribution ==
This marine species is endemic to New Zealand.
