= Copulabyssia leptalea =

Scientific classification
- Kingdom: Animalia
- Phylum: Mollusca
- Class: Gastropoda
- Subclass: Vetigastropoda
- Order: Lepetellida
- Family: Pseudococculinidae
- Genus: Copulabyssia
- Species: C. leptalea

Binomial name
- Copulabyssia leptalea (A. E. Verrill, 1884)

Synonyms
- Cocculina leptalea A. E. Verrill, 1884

Species of gastropod

Copulabyssia leptalea is a species of sea snail, a marine gastropod mollusk in the family Pseudococculinidae.

== Description ==
The shell grows to a size of 4 mm.

== Distribution ==
This marine species occurs in the Atlantic Ocean from New Jersey to East Florida, USA, at depths between 530 m and 3,800 m.

== Description ==
The maximum recorded shell length is 4 mm.

== Habitat ==
Minimum recorded depth is 534 m. Maximum recorded depth is 3,834 m.
