= Coccopigya spinigera =

Scientific classification
- Kingdom: Animalia
- Phylum: Mollusca
- Class: Gastropoda
- Subclass: Vetigastropoda
- Family: Cocculinidae
- Genus: Coccopigya
- Species: C. spinigera

Binomial name
- Coccopigya spinigera (Jeffreys, 1883)

Synonyms
- Cocculina conspersa Dautzenberg & H. Fischer, 1897

Species of gastropod

Coccopigya spinigera is a species of sea snail, deep-sea limpet, a marine gastropod mollusk in the family Cocculinidae.

== Distribution ==
- Range: 39.7°N to 28°N; 83°W to 0°W.
- Eastern Atlantic: Iceland
- North West Atlantic
- USA: Virginia, North Carolina, Florida; Florida: West Florida

== Description ==
The maximum recorded shell length is 3.2 mm.

== Habitat ==
Minimum recorded depth is 613 m. Maximum recorded depth is 1550 m.
