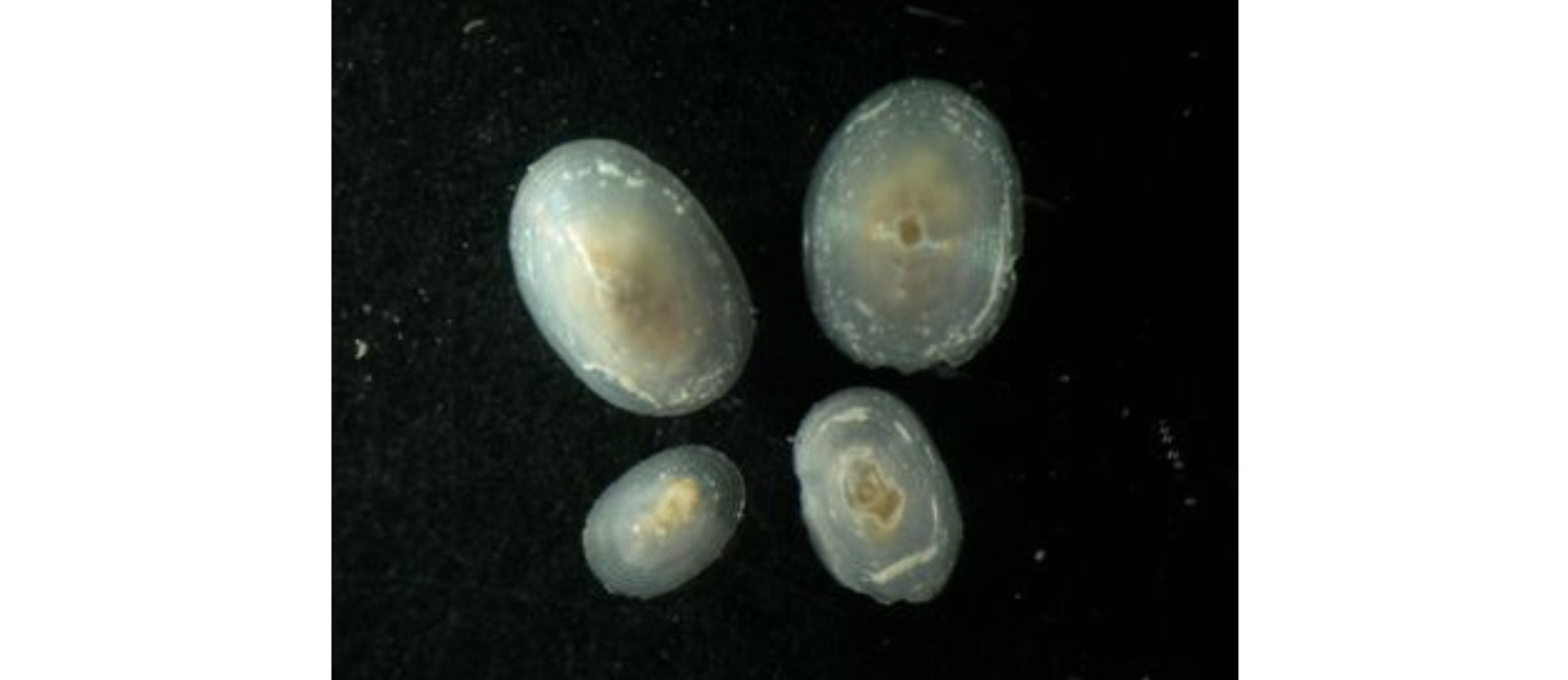
- Shell of Amphiplica gordensis

Scientific classification
- Kingdom: Animalia
- Phylum: Mollusca
- Class: Gastropoda
- Subclass: Vetigastropoda
- Order: Lepetellida
- Family: Pseudococculinidae
- Genus: Amphiplica; Haszprunar, 1988

Type species
- Amphiplica venezuelensis J. H. McLean, 1988

= Amphiplica =

Genus of gastropods

Amphiplica is a genus of sea snails, marine gastropod mollusks in the family Pseudococculinidae.

== Distribution ==
This is a globally an abyssal genus.

== Species ==
Species within the genus Amphiplica include:

- Amphiplica concentrica (Thiele, 1909)
- Amphiplica gordensis McLean, 1991
- Amphiplica knudseni McLean, 1988
- Amphiplica plutonica Leal & Harasewych, 1999
- Amphiplica venezuelensis McLean, 1988
