= Coccopigya punctoradiata =

Scientific classification
- Kingdom: Animalia
- Phylum: Mollusca
- Class: Gastropoda
- Subclass: Vetigastropoda
- Family: Cocculinidae
- Genus: Coccopigya
- Species: C. punctoradiata

Binomial name
- Coccopigya punctoradiata (Kuroda & Habe, 1949)

Species of gastropod

Coccopigya punctoradiata is a species of sea snail, deep-sea limpet, a marine gastropod mollusk in the family Cocculinidae. Type locality of this species is at Tosa Bay, Japan.

== Distribution ==
This species is seen in Japan, South Korea and Taiwan. They habitat in deep sea.
