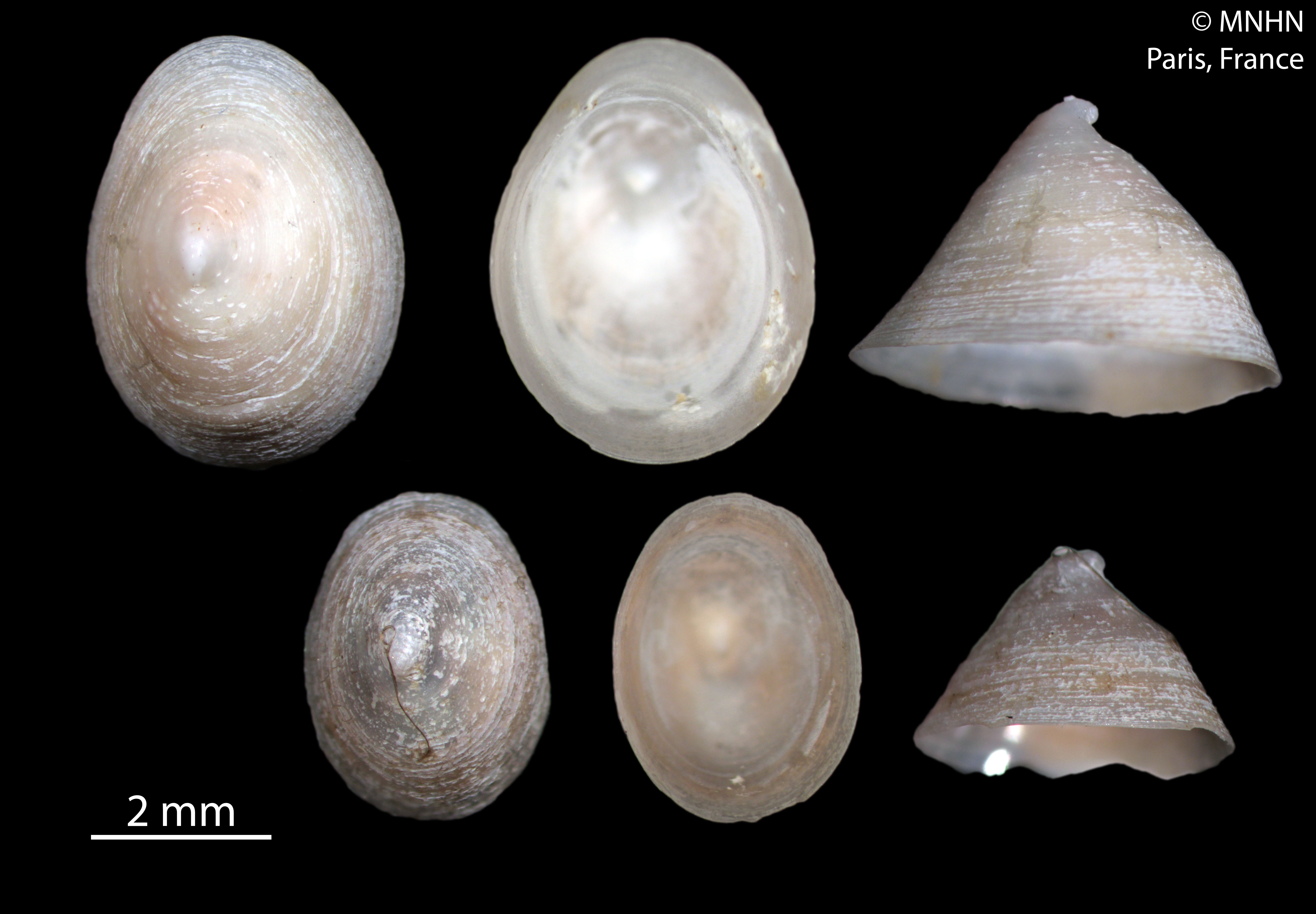
- Osteopelta praeceps

Scientific classification
- Kingdom: Animalia
- Phylum: Mollusca
- Class: Gastropoda
- Subclass: Vetigastropoda
- Order: Lepetellida
- Superfamily: Lepetelloidea
- Family: Osteopeltidae; Marshall, 1987

= Osteopeltidae =

Family of gastropods

Osteopeltidae is a taxonomic family of small, deep water sea snails, marine gastropod molluscs in the clade Vetigastropoda (according to the taxonomy of the Gastropoda by Bouchet & Rocroi, 2005). These limpets feed on organic waste on the deep-sea floor; one species, Baleenopelta rotunda, feeds on decaying whale baleen.

This family has no subfamilies.

== Genera ==
Genera within the family Osteopeltidae include:

- Osteopelta Marshall, 1987 (type genus)
- Baleenopelta Marshall & Walton, 2021
