= Bathyphytophilidae =

Scientific classification
- Kingdom: Animalia
- Phylum: Mollusca
- Class: Gastropoda
- Subclass: Vetigastropoda
- Order: Lepetellida
- Superfamily: Lepetelloidea
- Family: Bathyphytophilidae; Moskalev, 1978

Family of gastropods

Bathyphytophilidae is a family of very small deepwater sea snails or false limpets, marine gastropod mollusks in the clade Vetigastropoda (according to the taxonomy of the Gastropoda by Bouchet & Rocroi, 2005).

This family has no subfamilies.

== Genera ==
Genera within the family Bathyphytophilidae include:

- Aenigmabonus Moskalev, 1978
- Bathyphytophilus Moskalev, 1978, the type genus
