= Caymanabyssiidae =

Scientific classification
- Kingdom: Animalia
- Phylum: Mollusca
- Class: Gastropoda
- Subclass: Vetigastropoda
- Order: Lepetellida
- Superfamily: Lepetelloidea
- Family: Caymanabyssiidae; Marshall, 1986

Family of gastropods

Caymanabyssiidae is a family of sea snails, marine gastropod molluscs in the vaude Vetigastropoda (according to the taxonomy of the Gastropoda by Bouchet & Rocroi, 2005).

This family has no subfamilies. This family was originally the subfamily Caymanabyssiinae Marshall 1985, in the family Pseudococculinidae, containing the genera Caymanabyssia and Colotrachelus. The three other genena were added later by Haszprunar (1988)

== Description ==
The microsculpture of the protoconch consists of prismatic crystals. The apical folds are fused. The rachidian and the lateral teeth of the radula lack cutting surfaces. They have one or several gill leaflets on the left side of the soft body.

== Genera ==
- Amphiplica Haszprunar, 1988
- Caymanabyssia Moskalev, 1976
- Colotrachelus Marshall, 1986
- Yaquinabyssia Haszprunar, 1988
