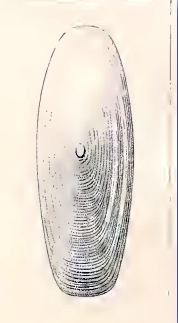
- Cocculinella minutissima

Scientific classification
- Kingdom: Animalia
- Phylum: Mollusca
- Class: Gastropoda
- Subclass: Vetigastropoda
- Order: Lepetellida
- Superfamily: Lepetelloidea
- Family: Cocculinellidae; Moskalev, 1971

= Cocculinellidae =

Family of gastropods

Cocculinellidae is a family of small sea snails, deepwater limpets, marine gastropod mollusks in the clade Vetigastropoda (according to the taxonomy of the Gastropoda by Bouchet & Rocroi, 2005). This family has no subfamilies.

== Genera ==
Genera within this species include:

- Cocculinella Thiele, 1909
