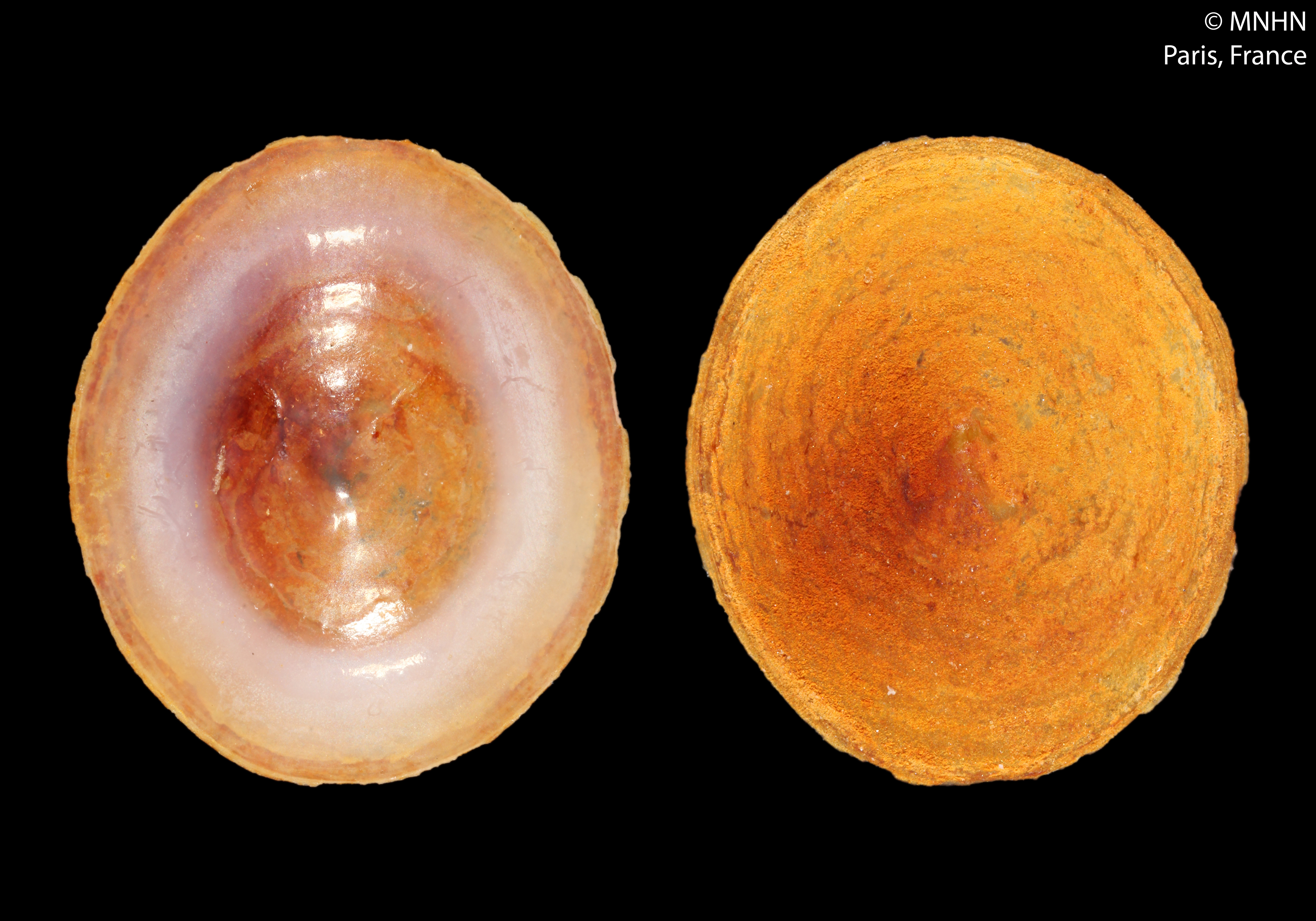
- Pyropelta sibuetae

Scientific classification
- Kingdom: Animalia
- Phylum: Mollusca
- Class: Gastropoda
- Subclass: Vetigastropoda
- Order: Lepetellida
- Superfamily: Lepetelloidea
- Family: Pyropeltidae; McLean & Haszprunar, 1987

= Pyropeltidae =

Family of gastropods

Pyropeltidae is a family of gastropods in the clade Vetigastropoda (according to the taxonomy of the Gastropoda by Bouchet & Rocroi, 2005).

This family has no subfamilies.

== Habitat ==
Their habitat includes hydrothermal vents and whale-fall habitats.

== Genera ==
Genera in the family Pyropeltidae include:

- Pyropelta McLean & Haszprunar, 1987
