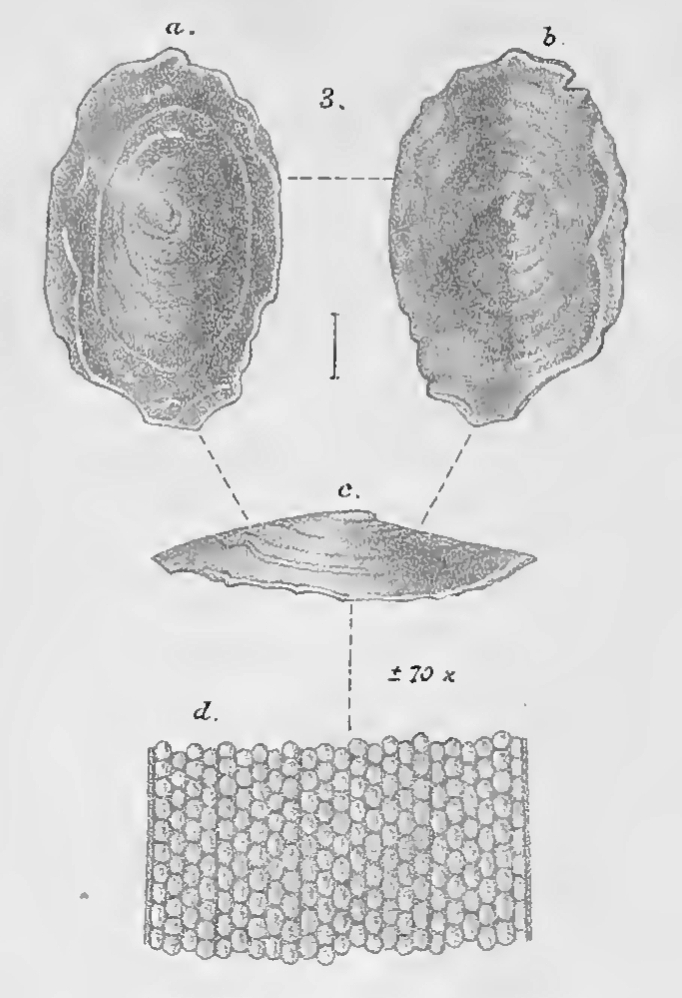
- Pseudococculina granulata shell drawing

Scientific classification
- Kingdom: Animalia
- Phylum: Mollusca
- Class: Gastropoda
- Subclass: Vetigastropoda
- Order: Lepetellida
- Superfamily: Lepetelloidea
- Family: Pseudococculinidae; Hickman CS, 1983

= Pseudococculinidae =

Family of gastropods

Pseudococculinidae is a family of small sea snails or false limpets, marine gastropod mollusks in the superfamily Lepetelloidea (according to the taxonomy of the Gastropoda by Bouchet & Rocroi, 2005).

This family has no subfamilies. The species in this family are hermaphroditic. They can be found from sublittoral to hadal depths.

== Description ==
The shells are small (less than 6 mm), thin and translucent. The protoconch shows a long, narrow apical fold. Its microscopic sculpture is smooth with fine threads. The asymmetrical radula shows a broad, rachidian tooth that lacks a cusp, four inner lateral teeth, a large pluricuspid tooth, and numerous marginal teeth.

Soft body: the right tentacle is generally modified into a copulatory organ.

== Genera ==
Genera in the family Pseudococculinidae include:

- Amphiplica Haszprunar, 1988
- Bandabyssia Moskalev, 1976
- Copulabyssia Haszprunar, 1988
- Kaiparapelta B.A. Marshall, 1986
- Kurilabyssia Moskalev, 1976
- Mesopelex B.A. Marshall, 1986
- Notocrater Finlay, 1926
- Pseudococculina Schepman, 1908
- Punctabyssia McLean, 1991
- Tentaoculus Moskalev, 1976
- Yaquinabyssia Haszprunar, 1988

Synonyms

- Subfamily Caymanabyssiinae B. A. Marshall, 1986 Caymanabyssiidae B. A. Marshall, 1986 (original rank)
- Punctolepeta Habe, 1958 Notocrater Finlay, 1926
