= Lepetelloidea =

- Three views of Addisonia excentrica

Scientific classification
- Kingdom: Animalia
- Phylum: Mollusca
- Class: Gastropoda
- Subclass: Vetigastropoda
- Order: Lepetellida
- Superfamily: Lepetelloidea; Dall, 1882

Families
- See text

Superfamily of gastropods

Lepetelloidea is a superfamily of sea snails, small deepwater limpets, marine gastropod mollusks in the clade Vetigastropoda (according to the taxonomy of the Gastropoda by Bouchet & Rocroi, 2005). (Previously this superfamily was in the order Cocculiniformia.)

== Description ==
Species in this superfamily have undivided shell muscles (except Lepetellidae). They possess secondary gill leaflets or their gills are reduced. Their radula contains a well-developed rachidian tooth.

The soft body lacks subpallial (i.e. below the mantle) glands. They have paired kidneys with the right one larger. With the exception of the subfamily Choristellinae, all known lepetelloids are simultaneous hermaphrodites, meaning they possess both male and female reproductive organs at the same time. Species in the subfamily Choristellinae are gonochoristic, i.e. with distinct males and females). The ciliated gonoducts (the ducts through which the gametes reach the exterior) contain no glands.

== Families ==
Families within the superfamily Lepetelloidea include:

- Addisoniidae
- Bathyphytophilidae
- Caymanabyssiidae
- Cocculinellidae
- Lepetellidae Dall, 1881
  - Choristellinae - in the taxonomy of the Gastropoda according to Bouchet & Rocroi, 2005, the group of species previously known as the family Choristellidae was reranked as Choristellinae, a subfamily of Lepetellidae.
- Osteopeltidae
- Pseudococculinidae
- Pyropeltidae
