= Gastropod classification =

This overview lists proposed changes in the taxonomy of gastropods at the family level and above. There have been many changes in the way various groups of snails and slugs are classified.

Changes in subfamilies are outlined in the respective articles about each particular family. Unchanged taxa are not listed here.

In one of the largest recent changes (affecting the most species of gastropods), Klussmann-Kolb et al. (2008) showed that the traditional classification of the Euthyneura needed to be reconsidered. The change was subsequently made by Jörger et al. (2010), who redefined the major groups within the Heterobranchia.

A great number of major changes have been made within the classification of the Conoidea since 2011.

== Significant taxonomies ==
Systems of classification are primarily of value to malacologists (people who study mollusks) and other biologists. Biological classification schemes are not merely a convenience, they are an attempt to show the actual phylogeny (the evolutionary relatedness) within a group of organisms. Thus, a taxonomy can be seen as an attempt to elucidate part of the tree of life, a phylogenetic tree.

Gastropods are a taxonomic class of animals which consists of snails and slugs of every kind, from the land, from freshwater, and from saltwater.

=== Ponder & Lindberg, 1997 ===
Towards a phylogeny of gastropod molluscs: an analysis using morphological characters. was published by Winston Ponder and David R. Lindberg in 1997.

This taxonomy assigns the various Gastropods into ranked categories, such as sub-orders and families, but does not address the classification of genera or individual species. This classification scheme is based on the molluscs' internal and external shapes and forms, but did not take into account any analysis of their DNA or RNA.

Ponder & Lindberg (1997) used only four families to analyze the Euthyneura. Further work by Dayrat & Tillier (2002) provided a great deal of detail about the relationships between within the Euthyneura.

Ponder & Lindberg (1997) did not use Linnean taxonomical ranks in their work, but the results of their paper were widely adapted and used with Linnean taxonomical ranks by other authors.

Class Gastropoda Cuvier, 1797
Incertæ sedis

- Order Bellerophontinaka (fossil)
- Order Mimospirina (fossil)

Subclass Eogastropoda Ponder & David R. Lindberg, 1996 (earlier: Prosobranchia)

- Order Euomphalida de Koninck 1881 (fossil)
  - Superfamily Macluritoidea
  - Superfamily Euomphaloidea
  - Superfamily Platyceratoidea

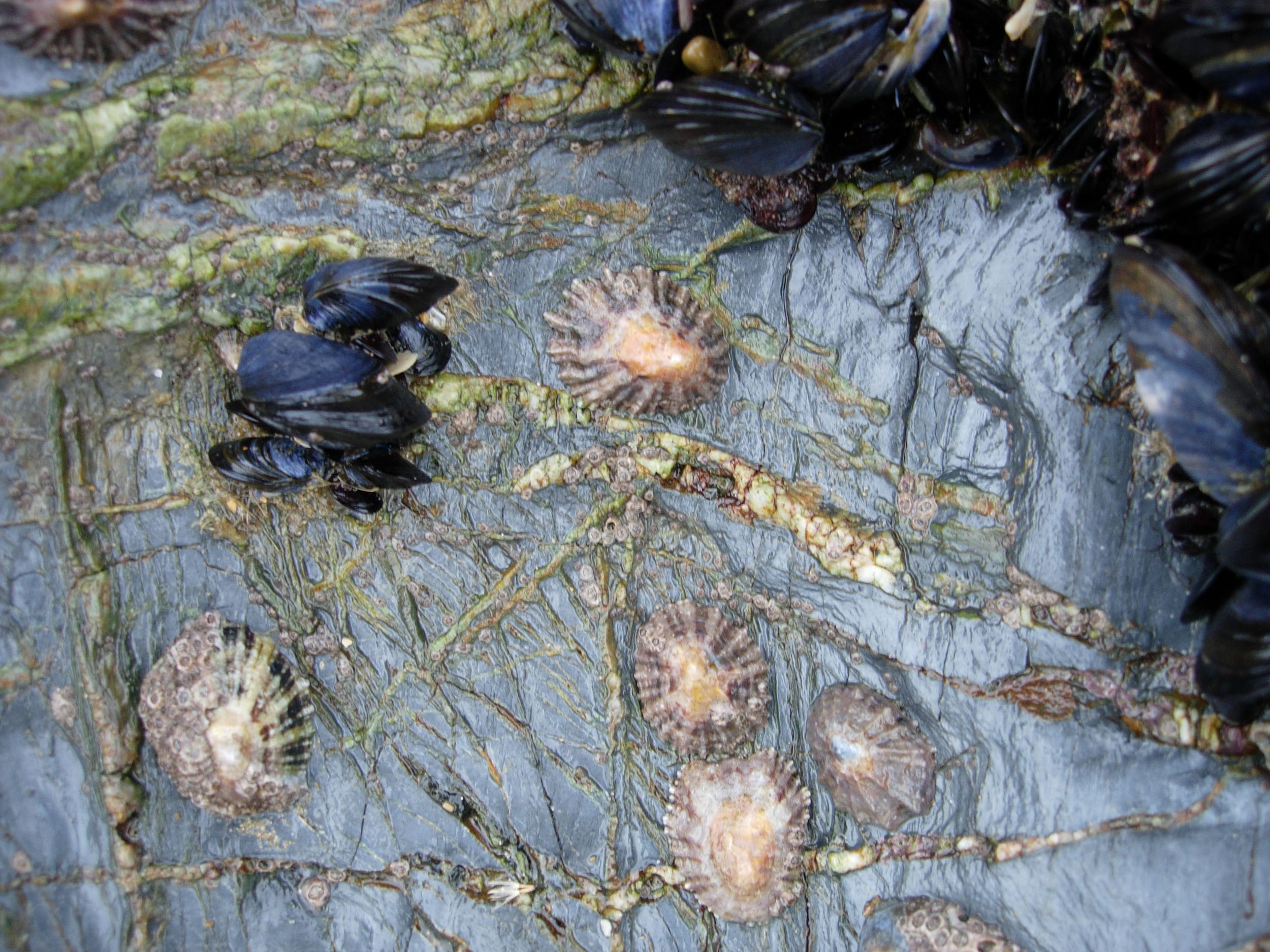
Live limpets in the intertidal zone in Cornwall, England.

- Order Patellogastropoda Lindberg, 1986 (true limpets)
  - Suborder Patellina Van Ihering, 1876
    - Superfamily Patelloidea Rafinesque, 1815
  - Suborder Nacellina David R. Lindberg, 1988
    - Superfamily Acmaeoidea Carpenter, 1857
    - Superfamily Nacelloidea Thiele, 1891
  - Suborder Lepetopsina McLean, 1990
    - Superfamily Lepetopsoidea McLean, 1990

Subclass Orthogastropoda Ponder & David R. Lindberg, 1996 (earlier Prosobranchia, Opisthobranchia)
Incertæ sedis

- Order Murchisoniina Cox & Knight, 1960 (fossil)
    - Superfamily Murchisonioidea Koken, 1889
    - Superfamily Loxonematoidea Koken, 1889
    - Superfamily Lophospiroidea Wenz, 1938
    - Superfamily Straparollinoidea
  - Grade Subulitoidea Lindström, 1884

Superorder Cocculiniformia Haszprunar, 1987

    - Superfamily Cocculinoidea Dall, 1882
    - Superfamily Lepetelloidea Dall, 1882 (deep sea limpets)

Superorder "Hot Vent Taxa" Ponder & David R. Lindberg, 1997

- Order Neomphaloida Sitnikova & Starobogatov, 1983
    - Superfamily Neomphaloidea McLean, 1981 (hydrothermal vents limpets)
    - Superfamily Peltospiroidea McLean, 1989

Superorder Vetigastropoda Salvini-Plawen, 1989 (limpets)

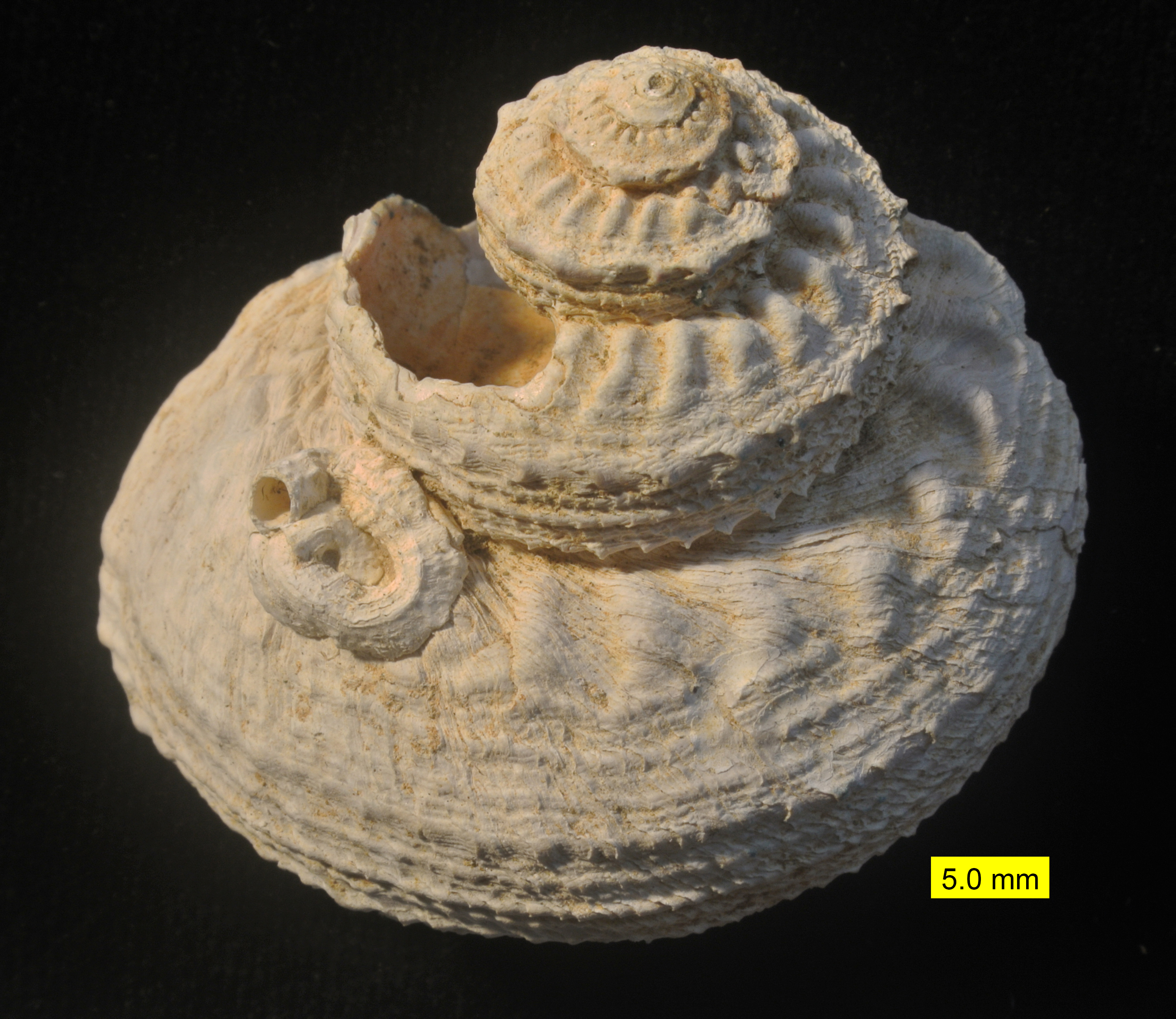
The shell of an archaeogastropod from the Pliocene of Cyprus. A serpulid worm is attached.

    - Superfamily Fissurelloidea Fleming, 1822 (keyhole limpets)
    - Superfamily Haliotoidea Rafinesque, 1815 (abalones)
    - Superfamily Lepetodriloidea McLean, 1988 (hydrothermal vent limpets)
    - Superfamily Pleurotomarioidea Swainson, 1840 (slit shells)
    - Superfamily Seguenzioidea Verrill, 1884
    - Superfamily Trochoidea Rafinesque, 1815 (top shells)

Superorder Neritaemorphi Koken, 1896

- Order Cyrtoneritomorpha (fossil)
- Order Neritopsina Cox & Knight, 1960
    - Superfamily Neritoidea Lamarck, 1809

Superorder Caenogastropoda Cox, 1960

- Order Architaenioglossa Haller, 1890
    - Superfamily Ampullarioidea J.E. Gray, 1824
    - Superfamily Cyclophoroidea J.E. Gray, 1847 (terrestrials)
- Order Sorbeoconcha Ponder & David R. Lindberg, 1997
  - Suborder Discopoda P. Fischer, 1884
    - Superfamily Campaniloidea Douvillé, 1904
    - Superfamily Cerithioidea Férussac, 1822
  - Suborder Hypsogastropoda Ponder & David R. Lindberg, 1997
    - Infraorder Littorinimorpha Golikov & Starobogatov, 1975
      - Superfamily Calyptraeoidea Lamarck, 1809
      - Superfamily Capuloidea J. Fleming, 1822
      - Superfamily Carinarioidea Blainville, 1818 (formerly called Heteropoda)
      - Superfamily Cingulopsoidea Fretter & Patil, 1958
      - Superfamily Cypraeoidea Rafinesque, 1815 (cowries)
      - Superfamily Ficoidea Meek, 1864
      - Superfamily Laubierinoidea Warén & Bouchet, 1990
      - Superfamily Littorinoidea (Children), 1834 (periwinkles)
      - Superfamily Naticoidea Forbes, 1838 (moon shells)
      - Superfamily Rissooidea J.E. Gray, 1847 (Risso shells) (includes genus Oncomelania, schistosomiasis transmission vector)
      - Superfamily Stromboidea Rafinesque, 1815 (true conchs)
      - Superfamily Tonnoidea Suter, 1913
      - Superfamily Trivioidea Troschel, 1863
      - Superfamily Vanikoroidea J.E. Gray, 1840
      - Superfamily Velutinoidea J.E. Gray, 1840
      - Superfamily Vermetoidea Rafinesque, 1815 (worm shells)
      - Superfamily Xenophoroidea Troschel, 1852 (carrier shells)
    - Infraorder Ptenoglossa J.E. Gray, 1853
      - Superfamily Eulimoidea Philippi, 1853
      - Superfamily Janthinoidea Lamarck, 1812
      - Superfamily Triphoroidea J.E. Gray, 1847
    - Infraorder Neogastropoda Thiele, 1929
      - Superfamily Buccinoidea (whelks, false tritions)
      - Superfamily Cancellarioidea Forbes & Hanley, 1851
      - Superfamily Conoidea Rafinesque, 1815
      - Superfamily Muricoidea Rafinesque, 1815

Superorder Heterobranchia J.E. Gray, 1840

- Order Heterostropha P. Fischer, 1885
    - Superfamily Architectonicoidea J.E. Gray, 1840
    - Superfamily Nerineoidea Zittel, 1873 (fossil)
    - Superfamily Omalogyroidea G.O. Sars, 1878
    - Superfamily Pyramidelloidea J.E. Gray, 1840
    - Superfamily Rissoelloidea J.E. Gray, 1850
    - Superfamily Valvatoidea J.E. Gray, 1840
- Order Opisthobranchia Milne-Edwards, 1848
  - Suborder Cephalaspidea P. Fischer, 1883
    - Superfamily Acteonoidea D'Orbigny, 1835
    - Superfamily Bulloidea Lamarck, 1801
    - Superfamily Cylindrobulloidea Thiele, 1931 (has to be included in the Sacoglossa)
    - Superfamily Diaphanoidea Odhner, 1914
    - Superfamily Haminoeoidea Pilsbry, 1895
    - Superfamily Philinoidea J.E. Gray, 1850
    - Superfamily Ringiculoidea Philippi, 1853
  - Suborder Sacoglossa Von Ihering, 1876
    - Superfamily Oxynooidea H. Adams & A. Adams, 1854
  - Suborder Anaspidea P. Fischer, 1883 (sea hares)
    - Superfamily Akeroidea Pilsbry, 1893
    - Superfamily Aplysioidea Lamarck, 1809
  - Suborder Notaspidea P. Fischer, 1883
    - Superfamily Tylodinoidea J.E. Gray, 1847
    - Superfamily Pleurobranchoidea Férussac, 1822
  - Suborder Thecosomata Blainville, 1824 (sea butterflies)
    - Infraorder Euthecosomata
      - Superfamily Limacinoidea
      - Superfamily Cavolinioidea
    - Infraorder Pseudothecosomata
      - Superfamily Peraclidoidea
      - Superfamily Cymbulioidea
  - Suborder Gymnosomata Blainville, 1824 (sea angels)
    - Family Clionidae Rafinesque, 1815
    - Family Cliopsidae Costa, 1873
    - Family Hydromylidae Pruvot-Fol, 1942
    - Family Laginiopsidae Pruvot-Fol, 1922
    - Family Notobranchaeidae Pelseneer, 1886
    - Family Pneumodermatidae Latreille, 1825
    - Family Thliptodontidae Kwietniewski, 1910
  - Suborder Nudibranchia Blainville, 1814 (nudibranchs)
  - Infraorder Anthobranchia Férussac, 1819
    - Superfamily Doridoidea Rafinesque, 1815
    - Superfamily Doridoxoidea Bergh, 1900
    - Superfamily Onchidoridoidea Alder & Hancock, 1845
    - Superfamily Polyceroidea Alder & Hancock, 1845
  - Infraorder Cladobranchia Willan & Morton, 1984
    - Superfamily Dendronotoidea Allman, 1845
    - Superfamily Arminoidea Rafinesque, 1814
    - Superfamily Metarminoidea Odhner in Franc, 1968
    - Superfamily Aeolidioidea J.E. Gray, 1827

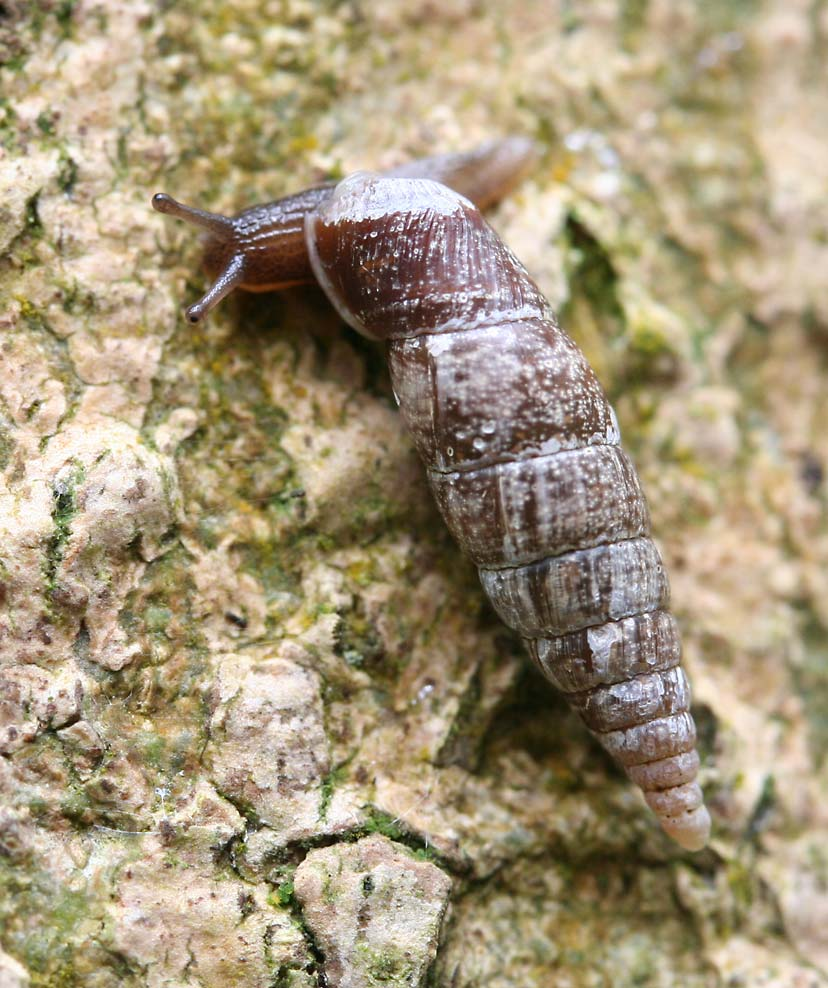
Cochlodina laminata from the family Clausiliidae or door snails, a small land pulmonate which has a sinistral or left-handed shell, on the trunk of a tree, in woodland, England

- Order Pulmonata Cuvier in Blainville, 1814 (pulmonates)
  - Suborder Systellommatophora Pilsbry, 1948
    - Superfamily Onchidioidea Rafinesque, 1815
    - Superfamily Otinoidea H. Adams & A. Adams, 1855
    - Superfamily Rathouisioidea Sarasin, 1889
  - Suborder Basommatophora Keferstein in Bronn, 1864 (freshwater pulmonates, pond snails)
    - Superfamily Acroloxoidea Thiele, 1931
    - Superfamily Amphiboloidea J.E. Gray, 1840
    - Superfamily Chilinoidea H. Adams & A. Adams, 1855
    - Superfamily Glacidorboidea Ponder, 1986
    - Superfamily Lymnaeoidea Rafinesque, 1815
    - Superfamily Planorboidea Rafinesque, 1815
    - Superfamily Siphonarioidea J.E. Gray, 1840
  - Suborder Eupulmonata Haszprunar & Huber, 1990
  - Infraorder Acteophila Dall, 1885 (= formerly Archaeopulmonata)
    - Superfamily Melampoidea Stimpson, 1851
  - Infraorder Trimusculiformes Minichev & Starobogatov, 1975
    - Superfamily Trimusculoidea Zilch, 1959
  - Infraorder Stylommatophora A. Schmidt, 1856 (land snails)
  - Subinfraorder Orthurethra
    - Superfamily Achatinelloidea Gulick, 1873
    - Superfamily Cochlicopoidea Pilsbry, 1900
    - Superfamily Partuloidea Pilsbry, 1900
    - Superfamily Pupilloidea Turton, 1831
  - Subinfraorder Sigmurethra
    - Superfamily Acavoidea Pilsbry, 1895
    - Superfamily Achatinoidea Swainson, 1840
    - Superfamily Aillyoidea Baker, 1960
    - Superfamily Arionoidea J.E. Gray in Turnton, 1840
    - Superfamily Buliminoidea Clessin, 1879
    - Superfamily Camaenoidea Pilsbry, 1895
    - Superfamily Clausilioidea Mörch, 1864
    - Superfamily Dyakioidea Gude & Woodward, 1921
    - Superfamily Gastrodontoidea Tryon, 1866
    - Superfamily Helicoidea Rafinesque, 1815
    - Superfamily Helixarionoidea Bourguignat, 1877
    - Superfamily Limacoidea Rafinesque, 1815
    - Superfamily Oleacinoidea H. Adams & A. Adams, 1855
    - Superfamily Orthalicoidea Albers-Martens, 1860
    - Superfamily Plectopylidoidea Moellendorf, 1900
    - Superfamily Polygyroidea Pilsbry, 1894
    - Superfamily Punctoidea Morse, 1864
    - Superfamily Rhytidoidea Pilsbry, 1893
    - Superfamily Sagdidoidea Pilsbry, 1895
    - Superfamily Staffordioidea Thiele, 1931
    - Superfamily Streptaxoidea J.E. Gray, 1806
    - Superfamily Strophocheiloidea Thiele, 1926
    - Superfamily Trigonochlamydoidea Hese, 1882
    - Superfamily Zonitoidea Mörch, 1864
    - ? Superfamily Athoracophoroidea P. Fischer, 1883 (= Tracheopulmonata)
    - ? Superfamily Succineoidea Beck, 1837 (= Heterurethra)

Other extant classes of the Mollusca are Bivalvia, Scaphopoda, Aplacophora, Polyplacophora, Monoplacophora and Cephalopoda.

=== Bouchet & Rocroi, 2005 ===
Philippe Bouchet and Jean-Pierre Rocroi published their revised taxonomy in 2005. The system encompasses both living and extinct groups, as well as some fossils whose classification as gastropods is uncertain. This taxnomy was laid out in a book-length paper entitled "Classification and Nomenclator of Gastropod Families", which was published in the journal Malacologia and which was written in collaboration with J. Frýda, B. Hausdorf, W. Ponder, Á. Valdés and A. Warén.

The Bouchet & Rocroi system was the first complete gastropod taxonomy that primarily employed the concept of clades, and was derived from research on molecular phylogenetics; in this context a clade is a "natural grouping" of organisms based upon a statistical cluster analysis. Higher taxa are expressed as unranked clades where known, and termed "informal groups" or groups" where monophyly (a single lineage) has not yet been determined, and where polyphyly (more than one lineage) is suspected. Clades are used between the rank of class and the rank of superfamily. The clades are unranked.

The taxonomy thus is an attempt to get one step closer to representing this part of the evolutionary history of the phylum Mollusca. Bouchet & Rocroi's classification system is a hybrid of the pre-existing, more traditional Linnaean taxonomy along with some more recent far-reaching revisions which are based on molecular work and use clades as taxa, (see cladistics).

The 2005 taxonomy differs from the 1997 taxonomy and other previous taxonomic schemes primarily in that they relied on morphological features to classify these animals, and used taxon ranks such as order, superorder and suborder, which are typical of classifications that are still inspired by Linnaean taxonomy. Morphological characteristics include shell characteristics (including the protoconch) in shelled species, and the internal anatomy, including the structure of the radula and details of the reproductive system. Recent advances are based more on the molecular characteristics of the DNA and RNA. This shift in emphasis has meant that the newer taxa and their hierarchy are subject to debate, a debate that is not likely to be resolved soon.

This proposed classification has tried to integrate the results of recent molecular work by using unranked clades for taxa below the traditional rank of class (class Gastropoda) but above the rank of superfamily (replacing the ranks subclass, superorder, order, and suborder), while still using the traditional Linnaean ranks for superfamilies and all taxa below the rank of superfamily (i.e., family, subfamily, tribe, genus, subgenus, and species. The clades have been given names which are similar to, or in some cases the same as, traditional Linnaean names for taxa above the level of superfamily. Whenever monophyly (a single ancestry) has not yet been tested and confirmed, or where a traditional taxon of gastropods has already been discovered to be paraphyletic (that it excludes some of its descendants) the term "group" or "informal group" has been used. Both Linnaean taxa and clades are invalid if it turns out they are polyphyletic, in other words if they consist of more than one lineage.

Bouchet and Rocroi use six main clades: Patellogastropoda, Vetigastropoda, Cocculiniformia, Neritimorpha, Caenogastropoda, and Heterobranchia. The first three of these major clades have no nesting clades within them: the taxonomy goes immediately to the superfamily level. Within the Caenogastropoda there is one extra clade. In contrast, within the Heterobranchia, for some of the nudibranch groups there are six separate clades above the level of superfamily, and in the case of most of the land snails, there are four clades above the level of superfamily.

In some parts of the taxonomy, instead of "clade", Bouchet and Rocroi labelled groupings of taxa as a "group" or an "informal group". A clade must by definition contain only one lineage, and it was considered to be the case that these "informal groups" may either contain more than one lineage, or only contain part of a lineage. Further research will eventually resolve these questions.

In this taxonomy 611 valid families are recognized. Of these, 202 families are exclusively fossil, and this is indicated here with a dagger †. Superfamily names are standardized so that they all end in the suffix "-oidea", also commonly used for superorders and subclasses, replacing the "-acea" ending found especially in the older literature. Classification of families into subfamilies however is often not well resolved, and should be regarded as the best possible hypothesis.

The publication Bouchet & Rocroi (2005) also includes a nomenclator of about 2400 suprageneric taxa (taxa above the level of genus) of gastropods, from the subtribe to the superfamily. A full bibliographic reference is provided for each taxon, giving the name of the authority, the original publication, the date of that publication, the type genus for the taxon, its nomenclatural status, and its validity under the rules of the ICZN.

The provisional taxonomy in the form of a cladogram (an evolutionary tree of descent).

- - † Paleozoic molluscs of uncertain systematic position
  - † Basal taxa that are certainly Gastropoda
  - Patellogastropoda
  - Vetigastropoda
  - Cocculiniformia
  - Neritimorpha
    - † Paleozoic Neritimorpha of uncertain systematic position
    - † Cyrtoneritimorpha
    - Cycloneritimorpha
  - Caenogastropoda
    - Caenogastropoda of uncertain systematic position
    - Architaenioglossa
    - Sorbeoconcha
    - Hypsogastropoda
      - Littorinimorpha
      - Ptenoglossa
      - Neogastropoda
  - Heterobranchia
    - Lower Heterobranchia
    - Opisthobranchia
      - Cephalaspidea
      - Pteropoda: Thecosomata
      - Pteropoda: Gymnosomata
      - Aplysiomorpha
      - Acochlidiacea
      - Sacoglossa
      - Cylindrobullida
      - Umbraculida
      - Nudipleura
        - Pleurobranchomorpha
        - Nudibranchia
          - Euctenidiacea
          - Dexiarchia
            - Pseudoeuctenidiacea
            - Cladobranchia
              - Euarminida
              - Dendronotida
              - Aeolidida
    - Pulmonata
      - Basommatophora
      - Eupulmonata
        - Systellommatophora
        - Stylommatophora
          - Elasmognatha
          - Orthurethra
          - Sigmurethra

The list format used below makes clear which taxa are informal groups rather than clades:

- Paleozoic molluscs of uncertain systematic position
- Clade Patellogastropoda
- Clade Vetigastropoda
- Clade Cocculiniformia
- Clade Neritimorpha
  - Paleozoic Neritimorpha of uncertain systematic position
  - Clade †Cyrtoneritimorpha
  - Clade Cycloneritimorpha
- Clade Caenogastropoda
  - Caenogastropoda of uncertain systematic position
  - Informal group Architaenioglossa
  - Clade Sorbeoconcha
  - Clade Hypsogastropoda
    - Clade Littorinimorpha
    - Informal group Ptenoglossa
    - Clade Neogastropoda
- Clade Heterobranchia
  - Informal group Lower Heterobranchia
  - Informal group Opisthobranchia
    - Clade Cephalaspidea
    - Clade Thecosomata
    - Clade Gymnosomata
    - Clade Aplysiomorpha
    - Group Acochlidiacea
    - Clade Sacoglossa
    - Group Cylindrobullida
    - Clade Umbraculida
    - Clade Nudipleura
      - Clade Pleurobranchomorpha
      - Clade Nudibranchia
        - Clade Euctenidiacea
        - Clade Dexiarchia
          - Clade Pseudoeuctenidiacea
          - Clade Cladobranchia
            - Clade Euarminida
            - Clade Dendronotida
            - Clade Aeolidida
  - Informal group Pulmonata
    - Informal group Basommatophora
    - Clade Eupulmonata
      - Clade Systellommatophora
      - Clade Stylommatophora
        - Clade Elasmognatha
        - Clade Orthurethra
        - Informal group Sigmurethra

=== Bouchet et al., 2017 ===
In December 2017, "Revised Classification, Nomenclator and Typification of Gastropod and Monoplacophoran Families" was published in the journal Malacologia (available online from 4 January 2018) by Philippe Bouchet & Jean-Pierre Rocroi, Bernhard Hausdorf, Andrzej Kaim, Yasunori Kano, Alexander Nützel, Pavel Parkhaev, Michael Schrödl and Ellen E. Strong in Malacologia, 2017, 61(1–2): 1–526. The authors have reverted to adopting the traditional ranks above superfamily: order, subclass, as this was preferred by many users. The same work also included the taxonomy of monoplacophorans. The work addresses the revision of family-level classification of gastropods, the standardization of nomenclature, and the designation or clarification of type taxa in accordance with international zoological rules (International Code of Zoological Nomenclature).

In response to the increasing use of online taxonomic databases, as well as user feedback expressing a preference for traditional hierarchical ranks (such as suborder, order, and subclass), this work reintroduces the use of formal taxonomic ranks above the level of superfamily, instead of employing terms such as "clade" and "informal group" as was done in the 2005 work.

Its main objectives include:

- updating classification schemes based on new data (including morphological and molecular evidence),
- resolving inconsistencies, redundancies, and ambiguities in scientific names, that includes evaluation of name validity (addressing synonymy and homonymy),
- designating or revising type genera and type species for individual families,
- establishment of new taxonomic combinations where necessary.

Methods used in this work include:

- critical review of historical and modern literature,
- analysis of morphological characters (such as shell structure, radula, and anatomy),
- incorporation of molecular phylogenetic data.

The results provide a reference framework for future taxonomic and biological research. This publication functions more as a taxonomic standard and a reference work, than a "hypothesis" that someone reviews in a single article.

There are altogether 721 gastropod families, that includes 245 exclusively fossil families and 476 recent families (with or without a fossil record).

Bouchet et al., 2017 is widely cited in taxonomic malacological publications and as of April 2026, it was cited by hundreds of works: by 541 works according CrossRef and by 943 works according Google Scholar.

The following cladogram shows a summary of the new gastropod taxonomy, according to the work's Contents section:

- Gastropoda
  - Amphigastropoda
    Bellerophontida †
  - Archaeobranchia
    - Pelagiellida †
    - Helcionellida †
  - Paleozoic Basal Taxa that are Certainly Gastropoda †
  - Patellogastropoda
    Patellida †
  - Neomphaliones
    - Neomphalida
    - Cocculinida
  - Vetigastropoda
    - Paleozoic Taxa of Uncertain Position †
    - Pleurotomariida
    - Seguenziida
    - Lepetellida
    - Trochida
  - Neritimorpha
    - Paleozoic Taxa of Uncertain Position †
    - Cyrtoneritida
    - Cycloneritida
  - Caenogastropoda
    - Fossil Taxa of Uncertain Position †
    - Architaenioglossa
    - Sorbeoconcha
      - Campanilimorpha
      - Cerithiimorpha
        Taxa of Uncertain Position
      - Hypsogastropoda
        - "Rissoiform Clade"
        - Latrogastropoda
          - Taxa of Uncertain Position
          - Neogastropoda
  - Heterobranchia
    - Fossil Taxa of Uncertain Position †
    - "Lower Heterobranchia"
    - Euthyneura
      - Taxa of Uncertain Position
      - Acteonimorpha
      - Ringipleura
        - Ringiculimorpha
          Ringiculida
        - Nudipleura
          - Pleurobranchida
          - Nudibranchia
            - Doridina
              - Bathydoridoidei
              - Doridoidei
            - Cladobranchia
      - Tectipleura
        - Euopisthobranchia
          - Umbraculida
          - Cephalaspidea
          - Runcinida
          - Aplysiida (Anaspidea)
          - Pteropoda
            - Euthecosomata
            - Pseudothecosomata
            - Gymnosomata
        - Panpulmonata
          - Sacoglossa
          - Siphonarimorpha
          - Pylopulmonata
          - Acochlidimorpha
          - Hygrophila
          - Eupulmonata
            - Ellobiida
            - Geophila
              - Systellommatophora
              - Stylommatophora
                - Fossil Taxa of Uncertain Position †
                - Achatinina
                - Scolodontina
                - Helicina
                  - Taxa of Uncertain Position
                  - Succineoidei (Elasmognatha)
                  - Rhytidoidei
                  - Orthalicoidei
                  - Pupilloidei (Orthurethra)
                  - Clausilioidei
                  - Arionoidei
                  - Limacoidei
                  - Oleacinoidei
                  - Helicoidei

== Current taxonomy ==
As of 2026, Bouchet et al., 2017 is still considered as "the most recent classification of fossil and living gastropods". It can be valid and up to date at least for some suprageneric taxa in 2026, while for some other families of gastropods researchers uses MolluscaBase (MolluscaBase.org) and World Register of Marine Species (WoRMS). These two online constantly updated taxonomic databases are also commonly used for taxonomy of gastropods at generic and species level.

=== †Paleozoic molluscs of uncertain position within Gastropoda or Monoplacophora ===
(Unassigned to Superfamily)

- †Family Khairkhaniidae Missarzhevsky, 1989
- †Family Ladamarekiidae Frýda, 1998
- †Family Metoptomatidae Wenz, 1938
- †Family Protoconchoididae Geyer, 1994 (=Patelliconidae Fryda, 1998)

†Superfamily Archinacelloidea Knight, 1952

- †Family Archinacellidae Knight, 1952
- †Family Archaeopragidae Horný, 1963

=== †Subclass Amphigastropoda ===
==== †Order Bellerophontida ====
†Superfamily Bellerophontoidea McCoy, 1852

- †Family Bellerophontidae McCoy, 1852
  - †Subfamily Bellerophontinae McCoy, 1852 (=Liljevallospiridae Golikov & Starobogatov, 1989)
  - †Subfamily Bucanopsinae Wahlman, 1992
  - †Subfamily Cymbulariinae Horný, 1963
  - †Subfamily Bellerophontinae Knight, 1956
- †Family Bucanellidae Koken, 1925
- †Family Bucaniidae Ulrich & Scofield, 1897
  - †Subfamily Bucaniinae Knight, 1956 (=Grandostomatinae Horný, 1962)
  - †Subfamily Plectonotinae Boucot & Yochelson, 1966
    - †Tribe Plectonotini Boucot & Yochelson, 1966
    - †Tribe Boucotonotini Frýda, 1999
  - †Subfamily Salpingostomatinae Koken, 1925
  - †Subfamily Undulabucaniinae Wahlman, 1992
- †Family Euphemitidae Knight, 1956
  - †Subfamily Euphemitinae Knight, 1956
  - †Subfamily Paleuphemitinae Frýda, 1999
- †Family Pterothecidae P. Fischer, 1883
  - †Subfamily Pterothecinae P. Fischer, 1883
  - †Subfamily Carinaropsinae Ulrich & Scofield, 1897
  - †Subfamily Pedasiolinae Wahlman, 1992
- †Family Sinuitidae Dall, 1913
  - †Subfamily Sinuitinae Dall, 1913 (=Protowarthiidae Ulrich & Scofield, 1897)
  - †Subfamily Aiptospirinae Wang, 1980
  - †Subfamily Hispanosinuitinae Frýda & Gutierrez-Marco, 1996
- †Family Tremanotidae Naef, 1911
- †Family Tropidodiscidae Knight, 1956 (=Temnodiscinae Horný, 1963)

=== †Subclass Archaeobranchia ===
==== †Order Pelagiellida ====
†Superfamily Pelagielloidea Knight, 1956 (=Orthostrophina)

- †Family Pelagiellidae Knight, 1956 (=Proeccyliopteridae Kobayashi, 1962; =Protoscaevogyridae Kobayashi, 1962)
- †Family Aldanellidae Linsley & Kier, 1984

==== †Order Helcionellida ====
†Superfamily Scenelloidea S. A. Miller, 1889

- †Family Scenellidae S. A. Miller, 1889
  - †Subfamily Scenellinae S. A. Miller, 1889 (=Palaeacmaeidae Grabau & Shimer, 1909; =Hampilininae Kobayashi, 1958; =Eosoconidae Yu, 1979; =Merismoconchidae Yu, 1979; =Shelbyoceratidae Stinchcomb, 1986; =Actinoconidae Starobogatov & Moskalev, 1987; =Yangtzemerismatinae Yu, 1987; =Marocellidae Topper, Brock, Skovsted & Paterson, 2009)
  - †Subfamily Yangtzeconinae Yu, 1979 (=Ceratoconidae Missarzhevsky, 1989)
- †Family Coreospiridae Knight, 1947 (=Archaeospiridae Yu, 1979; =Yangtzespirinae Yu, 1984; =Latouchellidae Golikov & Starobogatov, 1989)
- †Family Carinopeltidae Parkhaev, 2013 (=Igarkiellidae Parkhaev, 2001)

†Superfamily Yochelcionelloidea Runnegar & Jell, 1976

- †Family Yochelcionellidae Runnegar & Jell, 1976 (=Enigmaconidae MacKinnon, 1985)
- †Family Stenothecidae Runnegar & Jell, 1980
  - †Subfamily Stenothecinae Runnegar & Jell, 1980 (=Mellopegmidae Parkhaev, 2001)
  - †Subfamily Watsonellinae Parkhaev, 2001
- †Family Securiconidae Missarzhevsky, 1989 (=Rugaeconidae Vassiljeva, 1990; =Trenellidae Parkhaev, 2001)

=== †Paleozoic basal taxa that are certainly Gastropoda ===
(Unassigned to Superfamily)

- †Family Codonocheilidae S. A. Miller, 1889
- †Family Craspedostomatidae Wenz, 1938
  - †Subfamily Craspedostomatinae Wenz, 1938
  - †Subfamily Bucanospirinae Wenz, 1938
- †Family Crassimarginatidae Frýda, Blodgett & Lenz, 2002
- †Family Discohelicidae Schröder, 1995
- †Family Isospiridae Wangberg-Eriksson, 1964
- †Family Yuopisthonematidae Nützel, 2017 (=Opisthonematidae Yu, 1976)
- †Family Paraturbinidae Cossmann, 1916
- †Family Pragoserpulinidae Frýda, 1998
- †Family Raphistomatidae Koken, 1896 (=Ceratopeidae Yochelson & Bridge, 1957)
- †Family Rhytidopilidae Starobogatov, 1976
- †Family Scoliostomatidae Frýda, Blodgett & Lenz, 2002
  - †Subfamily Scoliostomatinae Frýda, Blodgett & Lenz, 2002
  - †Subfamily Mitchelliinae Frýda, Blodgett & Lenz, 2002
- †Family Sinuopeidae Wenz, 1938
  - †Subfamily Sinuopeinae Wenz, 1938
  - †Subfamily Platyschismatinae Knight, 1956
  - †Subfamily Turbonellininae Knight, 1956

†Superfamily Clisospiroidea S. A. Miller, 1889 (=Mimospirina)

- †Family Clisospiridae S. A. Miller, 1889
  - †Subfamily Clisospirinae S. A. Miller, 1889
  - †Subfamily Atracurinae Horný, 1964
  - †Subfamily Progalerinae Knight, 1956
  - †Subfamily Trochoclisinae Horný, 1964
- †Family Onychochilidae Koken, 1925
  - †Subfamily Onychochilinae Koken, 1925
  - †Subfamily Hyperstropheminae Horný, 1964
  - †Subfamily Scaevogyrinae Wenz, 1938

†Superfamily Euomphaloidea White, 1877

- †Family Euomphalidae White, 1877
  - †Subfamily Euomphalinae White, 1877 (=Schizostomatidae Bronn, 1849; =Polytropidae Ulrich, 1897; =Straparolinae Cossmann, 1916; =Poleumitidae Wenz, 1938)
  - †Subfamily Odontomariinae Frýda, Heidelberger & Blodgett, 2006
- †Family Euomphalopteridae Koken, 1896
  - †Subfamily Euomphalopterinae Koken, 1896
  - †Subfamily Spinicharybdiinae Rohr, Blodgett & Frýda, 2008
- †Family Helicotomidae Wenz, 1938
- †Family Lesueurillidae P. J. Wagner, 2002
- †Family Omphalocirridae Wenz, 1938
- †Family Omphalotrochidae Knight, 1945
- †Family Straparollinidae P. J. Wagner, 2002

†Superfamily Loxonematoidea Koken, 1889

- †Family Loxonematidae Koken, 1889 (=Holopellidae Koken, 1896; =Omospirinae Wenz, 1938)
- †Family Palaeozygopleuridae Horný, 1955

†Superfamily Macluritoidea Carpenter, 1861

- †Family Macluritidae Carpenter, 1861

†Superfamily Ophiletoidea Koken, 1907

- †Family Ophiletidae Koken, 1907 (=Ecculiomphalinae Wenz, 1938)

†Superfamily Oriostomatoidea Koken, 1896

- †Family Oriostomatidae Koken, 1896
- †Family Tubinidae Knight, 1956

†Superfamily Palaeotrochoidea† Knight, 1956

- †Family Palaeotrochidae Knight, 1956

†Superfamily Trochonematoidea Zittel, 1895

- †Family Trochonematidae Zittel, 1895
- †Family Lophospiridae Wenz, 1938 (=Gyronematinae Knight, 1956; =Ruedemaniinae Knight, 1956)

=== Subclass Patellogastropoda ===
==== Order Patellida ====
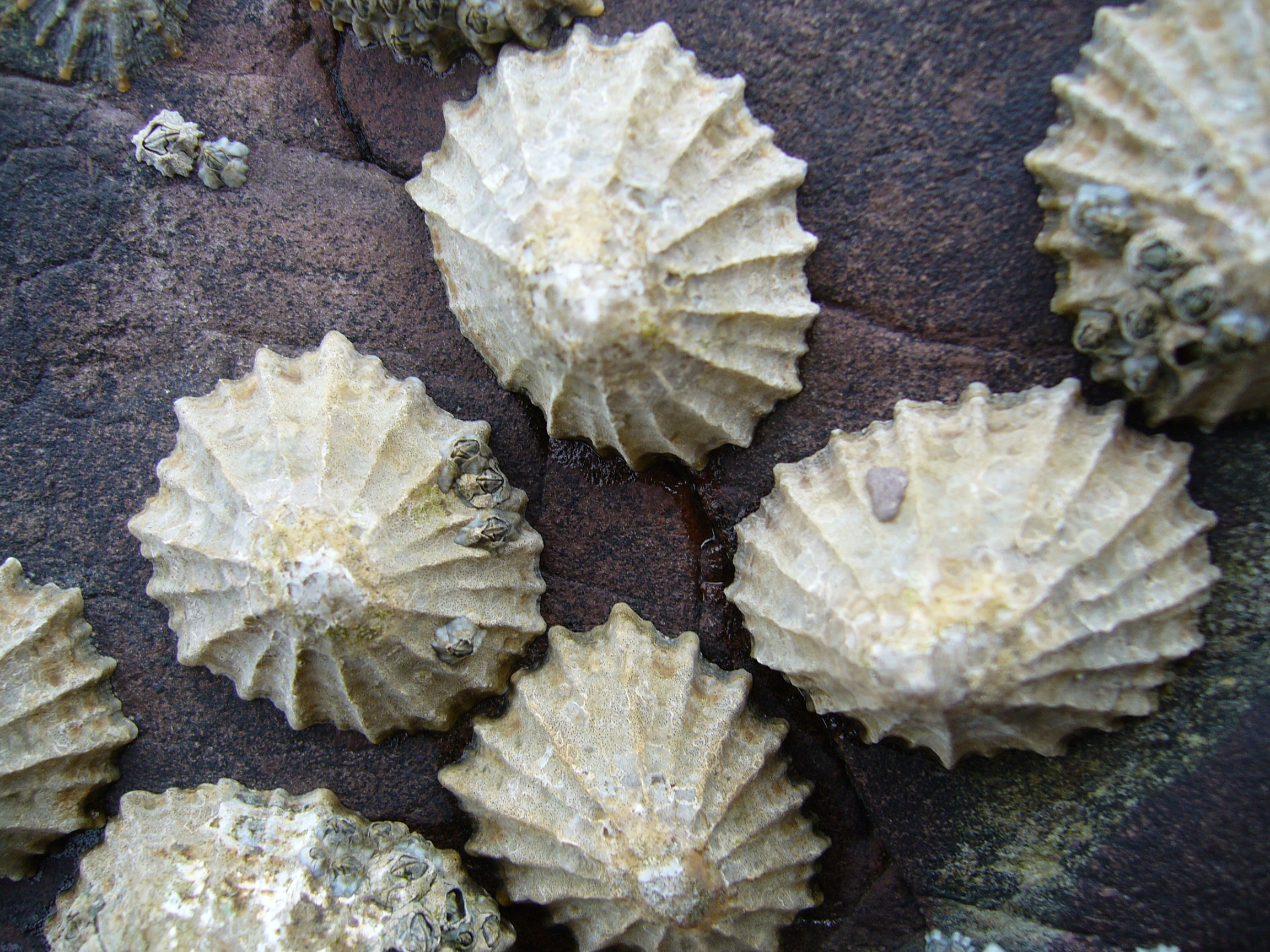
A group of live Patella vulgata, true limpets (common name for Patellogastropoda), on a rock in Wales

Superfamily Eoacmaeoidea Nakano & Ozawa, 2007

- Family Eoacmaeidae Nakano & Ozawa, 2007

Superfamily Patelloidea Rafinesque, 1815

- Family Patellidae Rafinesque, 1815

Superfamily Lottioidea Gray, 1840

- Family Lottiidae Gray, 1840
  - Subfamily Lottiinae Gray, 1840
    - Tribe Lottiini Gray, 1840
    - Tribe Patelloidini Chapman & Gabriel, 1923
  - Subfamily Tecturinae Gray, 1847
- Family Acmaeidae Forbes, 1850 (=Rhodopetalinae Lindberg, 1981; =Erginini Lindberg, 1990)
- †Family Damilinidae Horný, 1961
- Family Lepetidae Gray, 1850
  - Subfamily Lepetinae Gray, 1850
  - Subfamily Propilidiinae Thiele, 1891
- †Family Lepetopsidae McLean, 1990
- Family Nacellidae Thiele, 1891 (=Bertiniidae Jousseaume, 1883)
- Family Neolepetopsidae McLean, 1990
- Family Pectinodontidae Pilsbry, 1891

=== Subclass Neomphaliones ===
==== Order Neomphalida ====
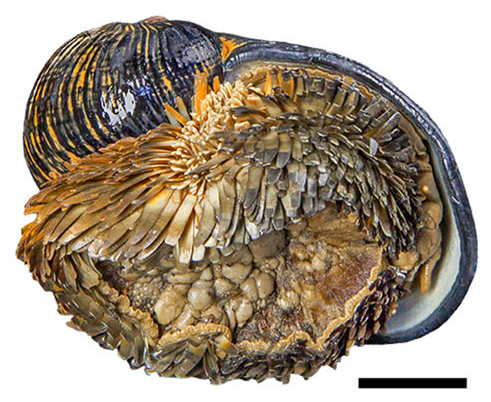
The scaly-foot snail, Chrysomallon squamiferum, a member of Peltospiridae, order Neomphalida

Superfamily Neomphaloidea McLean, 1981

- Family Neomphalidae McLean, 1981 (=Cyathermiidae McLean, 1990)
- Family Melanodrymiidae Salvini-Plawen & Steiner, 1995
- Family Peltospiridae McLean, 1989

==== Order Cocculinida ====
Superfamily Cocculinoidea Dall, 1882

- Family Cocculinidae Dall, 1882
- Family Bathysciadiidae Dautzenberg & H. Fischer, 1900 (=Bathypeltidae Moskalev, 1971)

=== Subclass Vetigastropoda ===
==== †Paleozoic taxa of uncertain position ====
- †Family Holopeidae Cossmann, 1908
- †Family Micromphalidae J. A. Harper, 2016

==== Order Pleurotomariida ====
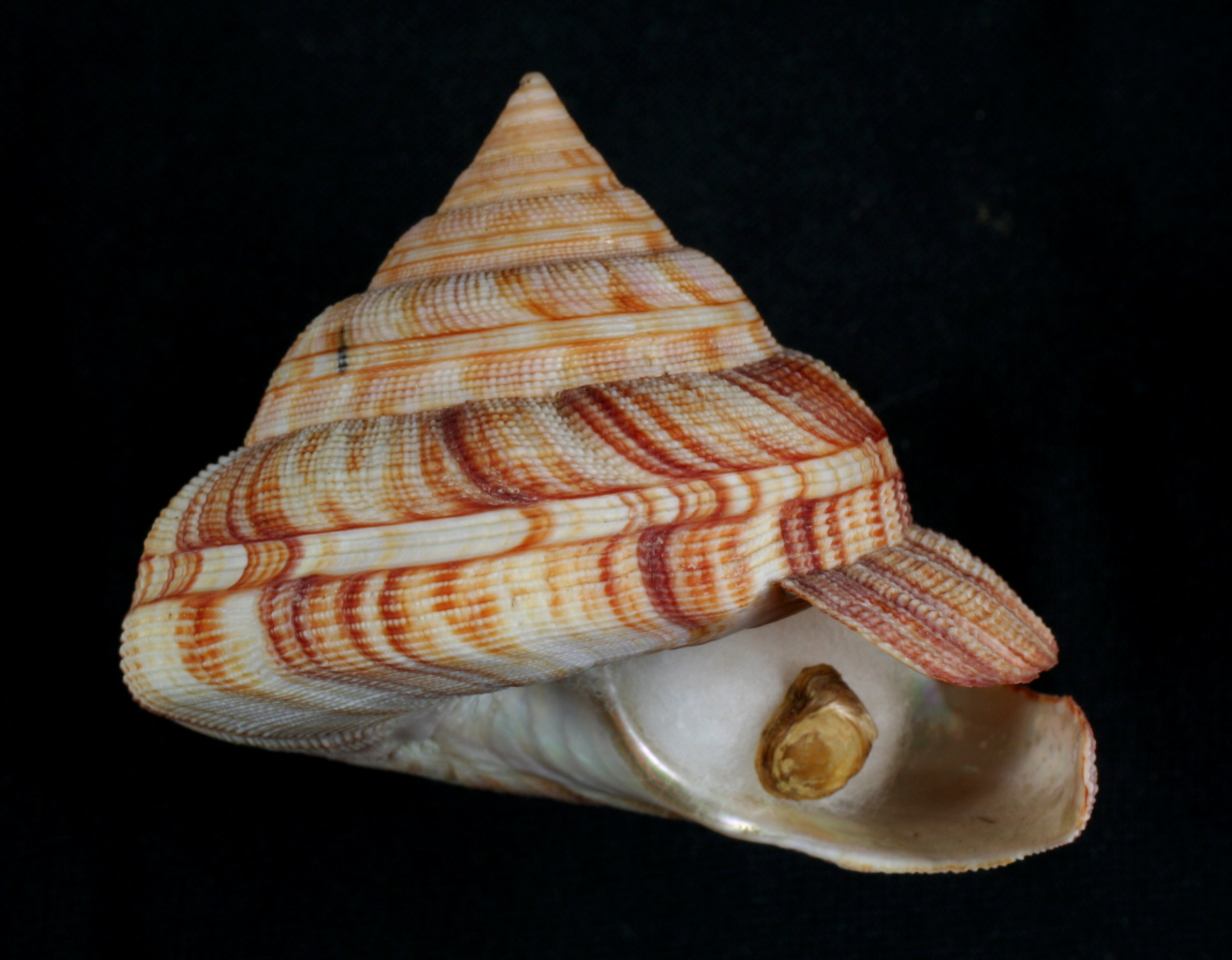
Shell of Perotrochus atlanticus, a member of Pleurotomariidae, the only extant family of order Pleurotomariida

†Superfamily Eotomarioidea Wenz, 1938

- †Family Eotomariidae Wenz, 1938
  - †Subfamily Eotomariinae Wenz, 1938 (=Liospirinae Knight, 1956)
    - †Tribe Eotomariini Wenz, 1938
    - †Tribe Deseretospirini Gordon & Yochelson, 1987
    - †Tribe Glabrocingulini Gordon & Yochelson, 1987
  - †Subfamily Neilsoniinae Knight, 1956
    - †Tribe Neilsoniini Knight, 1956
    - †Tribe Spirovallini Waterhouse, 2001
- †Family Gosseletinidae Wenz, 1938
  - †Subfamily Gosseletininae Wenz, 1938
  - †Subfamily Coelozoninae Knight, 1956
    - †Tribe Coelozonini Knight, 1956 (=Euryzoninae P. J. Wagner, 2002)
    - †Tribe Planozonini Knight, 1956
  - †Subfamily Triangulariinae Vostokova, 1960
- †Family Luciellidae Knight, 1956
- †Family Phanerotrematidae Knight, 1956
- †Family Pseudoschizogoniidae Bandel, 2009
- †Family Wortheniellidae Bandel, 2009

†Superfamily Murchisonioidea Koken, 1896

- †Family Murchisoniidae Koken, 1896
  - †Subfamily Murchisoniinae Koken, 1896 (=Hormotomidae Wenz, 1938)
  - †Subfamily Cheeneetnukiinae Blodgett & Cook, 2002
- †Family Farewelliidae Mazaev, 2011
- †Family Plethospiridae Wenz, 1938 (=Pithodeinae Wenz, 1938)
- †Family Ptychocaulidae Mazaev, 2011

Superfamily Pleurotomarioidea Swainson, 1840

- Family Pleurotomariidae Swainson, 1840
- †Family Catantostomatidae Wenz, 1938
- †Family Lancedelliidae Bandel, 2009
- †Family Phymatopleuridae Batten, 1956
- †Family Polytremariidae Wenz, 1938
- †Family Portlockiellidae Batten, 1956
- †Family Rhaphischismatidae Knight, 1956
- †Family Stuorellidae Bandel, 2009
- †Family Trochotomidae Cox, 1960 (1934) (=Ditremariinae Haber, 1934)
- †Family Zygitidae Cox, 1960

†Superfamily Porcellioidea Koken, 1895

- †Family Porcelliidae Koken, 1895
  - †Subfamily Porcelliinae Koken, 1895
  - †Subfamily Agnesiinae Knight, 1956
    - †Tribe Agnesiini Knight, 1956
    - †Tribe Anoriostomatini Frýda & Farrell, 2005
- †Family Cirridae Cossmann, 1916
  - †Subfamily Cirrinae Cossmann, 1916
  - †Subfamily Platyacrinae Wenz, 1938 (=Hesperocirrinae O. Haas, 1953)
  - †Subfamily Cassianocirrinae Bandel, 1993
- †Family Pavlodiscidae Frýda, 1998

†Superfamily Pseudophoroidea S. A. Miller, 1889

- †Family Planitrochidae Knight, 1956
- †Family Pseudophoridae S. A. Miller, 1889 (=Palaeonustidae Wenz, 1938)

†Superfamily Ptychomphaloidea Wenz, 1938

- †Family Ptychomphalidae Wenz, 1938 (=Ptychomphalinini Wenz, 1938; =Mourloniini Yochelson & Dutro, 1960)
- †Family Rhaphistomellidae Bandel, 2009

†Superfamily Schizogonioidea Cox, 1960

- †Family Schizogoniidae Cox, 1960
- †Family Pseudowortheniellidae Bandel, 2009

†Superfamily Sinuspiroidea Mazaev, 2011

- †Family Sinuspiridae Mazaev, 2011

==== Order Seguenziida ====
Superfamily Seguenzioidea Verrill, 1884

- Family Seguenziidae Verrill, 1884
  - Subfamily Seguenziinae Verrill, 1884
    - Tribe Seguenziini Verrill, 1884
    - Tribe Fluxinellini B. A.Marshall, 1991 (=Ancistrobasidae Bandel, 2010)
  - Subfamily Asthelysinae B. A.Marshall, 1991
  - Subfamily Davisianinae Egorova, 1972 (=Putillinae F. Nordsieck, 1972; =Oligomeriinae Egorov, 2000)
  - Subfamily Guttulinae Goryachev, 1987
- Family Cataegidae McLean & Quinn, 1987
- Family Chilodontaidae Wenz, 1938
- Family Choristellidae Bouchet & Warén, 1979
- Family Eucyclidae Koken, 1896 (=Amberleyidae Wenz, 1938; =Calliotropini Hickman & McLean, 1990; =Turcicidae Bandel, 2010)
- †Family Eucycloscalidae Gründel, 2007
- Family Eudaroniidae Gründel, 2007
- †Family Eunemopsidae Bandel, 2010
- †Family Lanascalidae Bandel, 1992
- †Family Laubellidae Cox, 1960
- Family Pendromidae Warén, 1991
- †Family Pseudoturcicidae Bandel, 2010
- †Family Sabrinellidae Bandel, 2010
- Family Trochaclididae Thiele, 1928 (=Acremodontinae B. A. Marshall, 1983)

==== Order Lepetellida ====
Superfamily Lepetelloidea Dall, 1882

- Family Lepetellidae Dall, 1882
- Family Addisoniidae Dall, 1882
  - Subfamily Addisoniinae Dall, 1882
  - Subfamily Helicopeltinae B. A. Marshall, 1996
- Family Bathyphytophilidae B. A. Marshall, 1986
- Family Caymanabyssiidae Moskalev, 1978
- Family Cocculinellidae Moskalev, 1971
- Family Osteopeltidae B. A. Marshall, 1987
- Family Pseudococculinidae Hickman, 1983
- Family Pyropeltidae McLean & Haszprunar, 1987

Superfamily Fissurelloidea Fleming, 1822

- Family Fissurellidae Fleming, 1822
  - Subfamily Fissurellinae Fleming, 1822
  - Subfamily Diodorinae Odhner, 1932
  - Subfamily Emarginulinae Children, 1834 (=Rimulidae Anton, 1838; =Fissurellideini Pilsbry, 1890; =Zeidoridae Naef, 1911; =Scutini Christiaens, 1973; =Clypidinidae Golikov & Starobogatov, 1989
  - Subfamily Hemitominae Kuroda, Habe & Oyama, 1971

Superfamily Haliotoidea Rafinesque, 1815

- Family Haliotidae Rafinesque, 1815 (=Deridobranchinae Gray, 1847
- †Family Temnotropidae Cox, 1960

Superfamily Lepetodriloidea McLean, 1988

- Family Lepetodrilidae McLean, 1988 (=Gorgoleptidae McLean, 1988; =Clypeosectidae McLean, 1989)
- Family Sutilizonidae McLean, 1989 (=Temnocinclinae McLean, 1989)

Superfamily Scissurelloidea Gray, 1847

- Family Scissurellidae Gray, 1847 (=Depressizoninae Geiger, 2003)
- Family Anatomidae McLean, 1989 (=Schizotrochidae Iredale & McMichael, 1962)
- Family Larocheidae Finlay, 1927

==== Order Trochida ====
Superfamily Trochoidea Rafinesque, 1815

- Family Trochidae Rafinesque, 1815
  - Subfamily Trochinae Rafinesque, 1815 (=Pyramidinae Gray, 1847)
  - Subfamily Alcyninae Williams, Donald, Spencer & Nakano, 2010
  - Subfamily Cantharidinae Gray, 1857 (=Pagodatrochidae Bandel, 2010)
  - Subfamily Chrysostomatinae Williams, Donald, Spencer & Nakano, 2010
  - Subfamily Fossarininae Bandel, 2009
  - Subfamily Halistylinae Keen, 1958
  - Subfamily Kaiparathininae B. A. Marshall, 1993
  - Subfamily Monodontinae Gray, 1857
  - Subfamily Stomatellinae Gray, 1840 (=Stomatiidae Carpenter, 1861)
  - Subfamily Umboniinae H. Adams & A. Adams, 1854 (1840) (=Rotellinae Swainson, 1840; =Talopiidae Finlay, 1928; =Bankiviini Hickman & McLean, 1990; =Lirulariinae Hickman & McLean, 1990; =Monileini Hickman & McLean, 1990; =Isandini Hickman, 2003)
- Family Angariidae Gray, 1857 (=Delphinulinae Stoliczka, 1868)
- †Family Anomphalidae Wenz, 1938
- †Family Araeonematidae Nützel, 2012
- Family Areneidae McLean, 2012
- Family Calliostomatidae Thiele, 1924 (1847)
  - Subfamily Calliostomatinae Thiele, 1924 (1847) (=Ziziphininae Gray, 1847)
  - †Subfamily Callotrochinae Szabó, 2011
  - Subfamily Fautricinae B. A. Marshall, 1995
  - Subfamily Margarellinae Williams, 2013
  - Subfamily Thysanodontinae B. A. Marshall, 1988
  - Subfamily Xeniostomatinae McLean, 2012
- Family Colloniidae Cossmann, 1917
  - Subfamily Colloniinae Cossmann, 1917 (=Bothropomatinae Thiele, 1924; =Homalopomatinae Keen, 1960)
  - †Subfamily Crossostomatinae Cox, 1960
    - †Tribe Tadeorbisinini Monari, Conti & Szabó, 1995
    - †Tribe Costataphrini Gründel, 2008
    - †Tribe Crossostomatini Cox, 1960
    - †Tribe Helicocryptini Cox, 1960
  - †Subfamily Lewisiellinae Gründel, 2008
  - Subfamily Liotipomatinae McLean, 2012
  - Subfamily Moelleriinae Hickman & McLean, 1990
  - †Subfamily Petropomatinae Cox, 1960
- Family Conradiidae Golikov & Starobogatov, 1987 (=Crosseolidae Hickman, 2013)
- †Family Nododelphinulidae Cox, 1960
- †Family Elasmonematidae Knight, 1956
- †Family Epulotrochidae Gründel, Keupp & Lang, 2017
- †Family Eucochlidae Bandel, 2002
- Family Liotiidae Gray, 1850
  - Subfamily Liotiinae Gray, 1850 (=Cyclostrematidae P. Fischer, 1885)
  - †Subfamily Brochidiinae Yochelson, 1956
  - †Subfamily Dichostasiinae Yochelson, 1956
- Family Margaritidae Thiele, 1924 (=Margaritinae Stoliczka, 1868; =Gazidae Hickman & McLean, 1990)
- †Family Metriomphalidae Gründel, Keupp & Lang, 2017
- †Family Microdomatidae Wenz, 1938
  - †Subfamily Microdomatinae Wenz, 1938
  - †Subfamily Decorospirinae Blodgett & Frýda, 1999
- Family Phasianellidae Swainson, 1840
  - Subfamily Phasianellinae Swainson, 1840 (=Eutropiinae Gray, 1847)
  - Subfamily Gabrieloninae Hickman & McLean, 1990
  - Subfamily Tricoliinae Woodring, 1928
- †Family Proconulidae Cox, 1960 (=Parataphrinae Calzada, 1989)
- †Family Sclarotrardidae Gründel, Keupp & Lang, 2017
- Family Skeneidae W. Clark, 1851 (=Delphinoideinae Thiele, 1924)
- Family Solariellidae Powell, 1951 (=Minoliinae Kuroda, Habe & Oyama, 1971)
- Family Tegulidae Kuroda, Habe & Oyama, 1971
- Family Turbinidae Rafinesque, 1815
  - Subfamily Turbininae Rafinesque, 1815 (=Senectinae Swainson, 1840; =Imperatorinae Gray, 1847; =Astraliinae H. Adams & A. Adams, 1854; =Astraeinae Davies, 1935; =Bolmidae Delpey, 1941)
  - †Subfamily Moreanellinae J. C. Fischer & Weber, 1997
  - Subfamily Prisogastrinae Hickman & McLean, 1990
- †Family Tychobraheidae Horný, 1992
- †Family Velainellidae Vasseur, 1880

=== Subclass Neritimorpha ===
==== †Paleozoic taxa of uncertain position ====
†Superfamily Nerrhenoidea Bandel & Heidelberger, 2001

- †Family Nerrhenidae Bandel & Heidelberger, 2001

†Superfamily Platyceratoidea Hall, 1879

- †Family Platyceratidae Hall, 1879 (=Cyclonematidae P. Fischer, 1885; =Platyostomatidae S. A. Miller, 1889; =Strophostylidae Grabau & Shimer, 1909; =Palaeocapulidae Grabau, 1936)

==== †Order Cyrtoneritida ====
- †Family Orthonychiidae Bandel & Frýda, 1999
- †Family Vltaviellidae Bandel & Frýda, 1999
  - †Subfamily Vltaviellinae Bandel & Frýda, 1999
  - †Subfamily Krameriellinae Frýda & Heidelberger, 2003

==== Order Cycloneritida ====
Superfamily Helicinoidea

- Family Helicinidae
  - Subfamily Helicininae (=Olygyridae; =Bourcierinae)
  - Subfamily Ceratodiscinae
  - †Subfamily Dimorphoptychiinae
  - Subfamily Hendersoniinae
  - Subfamily Stoastomatinae
  - Subfamily Vianinae
- †Family Dawsonellidae
- †Family Deianiridae
- Family Neritiliidae
- Family Proserpinellidae (=Ceresinae)
- Family Proserpinidae (=Despoenidae)

Superfamily Hydrocenoidea

- Family Hydrocenidae (=Georissinae)

†Superfamily Naticopsoidea

- †Family Naticopsidae
  - †Subfamily Naticopsinae
  - †Subfamily Ampezzonaticopsinae
  - †Subfamily Hologyrinae
- †Family Scalaneritinidae
- †Family Trachyspiridae
- †Family Tricolnaticopsidae

Superfamily Neritoidea

- Family Neritidae
  - Subfamily Neritinae (=Neritellinae; =Protoneritidae)
  - Subfamily Neritininae (=Orthopomatini; =Stenopomatini; =Septariini; =Theodoxinae)
  - Subfamily Smaragdiinae
  - †Subfamily Velatinae
- †Family Cortinellidae
- †Family Neridomidae
- †Family Neritariidae
  - †Subfamily Neritariinae
  - †Subfamily Oncochilinae
  - †Subfamily Trachyneritariinae
- †Family Otostomidae
- †Family Parvulatopsidae
- Family Phenacolepadidae
  - Subfamily Phenacolepadinae
  - Subfamily Shinkailepadinae
- †Family Pileolidae

Superfamily Neritopsoidea

- Family Neritopsidae
  - Subfamily Neritopsinae (=Titiscaniidae)
  - †Subfamily Cassianopsinae
  - †Subfamily Colubrellopsinae
  - †Subfamily Paffrathiinae
- †Family Delphinulopsidae
  - †Subfamily Delphinulopsinae
  - †Subfamily Platychilininae
- †Family Fedaiellidae
- †Family Palaeonaricidae
- †Family Plagiothyridae
- †Family Pseudorthonychiidae

†Superfamily Symmetrocapuloidea

- †Family Symmetrocapulidae

=== Subclass Caenogastropoda ===
==== †Fossil taxa of uncertain position ====
Unassigned to Superfamily

- †Family Acanthonematidae
- †Family Ampezzanildidae
- †Family Coelostylinidae
- †Family Kittlidiscidae
- †Family Plicatusidae
- †Family Pragoscutulidae
- †Family Pseudomelaniidae (=Trajanellidae)
- †Family Spanionematidae
- †Family Spirostylidae

†Superfamily Dendropupoidea

- †Family Dendropupidae
- †Family Anthracopupidae

†Superfamily Peruneloidea

- †Family Perunelidae
- †Family Chuchlinidae
- †Family Imoglobidae
- †Family Sphaerodomidae

†Superfamily Subulitoidea

- †Family Subulitidae (=Macrocheilidae; =Bulimorphidae; =Fusispiridae)
- †Family Ischnoptygmatidae

==== Grade Architaenioglossa ====
Superfamily Ampullarioidea

- Family Ampullariidae

Superfamily Cyclophoroidea

- Family Cyclophoridae
- Family Aciculidae (=Acmeidae)
- Family Craspedopomatidae
- Family Diplommatinidae
- †Family Ferussinidae
- Family Maizaniidae
- Family Megalomastomatidae
- Family Neocyclotidae
- Family Pupinidae

Superfamily Viviparoidea

- Family Viviparidae
- Family Pliopholygidae

==== Cohort Sorbeoconcha ====
Unassigned to Superfamily

- †Family Brachytrematidae
- †Family Globocornidae
- †Family Prostyliferidae

†Superfamily Acteoninoidea

- †Family Acteoninidae

†Superfamily Orthonematoidea

- †Family Orthonematidae
- †Family Goniasmatidae

†Superfamily Palaeostyloidea

- †Family Palaeostylidae

†Superfamily Pseudozygopleuroidea

- †Family Pseudozygopleuridae (=Cyclozygidae; Eoptychiidae; Stephanozygidae)
- †Family Goniospiridae (=Polygyrinidae)
- †Family Pommerozygiidae
- †Family Protorculidae
- †Family Zygopleuridae

†Superfamily Soleniscoidea

- †Family Soleniscidae
- †Family Anozygidae
- †Family Meekospiridae

===== Subcohort Campanilimorpha =====
Superfamily Campaniloidea

- Family Campanilidae
- Family Ampullinidae
- †Family Diozoptyxidae
- †Family Gyrodidae
- †Family Metacerithiidae

===== Subcohort Cerithiimorpha =====
Taxa of uncertain position

===== Subcohort Hypsogastropoda =====
====== Superorder Latrogastropoda ======
- Taxa of uncertain position
- Order Neogastropoda

=== Subclass Heterobranchia ===
==== Infraclass Euthyneura ====
===== Cohort Ringipleura =====
====== Subcohort Ringiculimorpha ======
- Order Ringiculida

====== Subcohort Nudipleura ======
- Order Pleurobranchida
- Order Nudibranchia
  - Suborder Doridina
    - Infraorder Bathydoridoidei
    - Infraorder Doridoidei
  - Suborder Cladobranchia

===== Cohort Tectipleura =====
====== Subcohort Euopisthobranchia ======
- Order Umbraculida
- Order Cephalaspidea
- Order Runcinida
- Order Aplysiida (Anaspidea)
- Order Pteropoda
  - Suborder Euthecosomata
  - Suborder Pseudothecosomata
  - Suborder Gymnosomata

====== Subcohort Panpulmonata ======
- Superorder Sacoglossa
- Superorder Siphonarimorpha
- Superorder Pylopulmonata
- Superorder Acochlidimorpha
- Superorder Hygrophila
- Superorder Eupulmonata

== Changes within specific taxa ==
=== Helcionelloida (not gastropods) ===
It has become clear that the fossil taxon Helcionelloida does not belong to the class Gastropoda; it is now a separate class within the Mollusca. P. Yu. Parkhaev (2006, 2007) created the class Helcionelloida, whose members were previously treated as "Paleozoic molluscs of uncertain systematic position" sensu Bouchet & Rocroi.

Subclass Archaeobranchia Parkhaev, 2001

- Order Helcionelliformes Golikov & Starobogatov, 1975
  - Superfamily Helcionelloidea Wenz, 1938

  - Family Helcionellidae Wenz, 1938
  - Family Igarkiellidae Parkhaev, 2001
  - Family Coreospiridae Knight, 1947

  - Superfamily Yochelcionelloidea Runnegar & Jell, 1976

  - Family Trenellidae Parkhaev, 2001
  - Family Yochelcionellidae Runnegar & Jell, 1976
  - Family Stenothecidae Runnegar & Jell, 1980

      - Subfamily Stenothecinae Runnegar & Jell, 1980
      - Subfamily Watsonellinae Parkhaev, 2001
- Order Pelagielliformes MacKinnon, 1985
  - Family Pelagiellidae Knight, 1952
  - Family Aldanellidae Linsley et Kier, 1984

Subclass Divasibranchia Minichev & Starobogatov, 1975

- Order Khairkhaniiformes Parkhaev, 2001
  - Family Khairkhaniidae Missarzhevsky, 1989

Subclass Dextrobranchia Minichev & Starobogatov, 1975

- Order Onychochiliformes Minichev & Starobogatov, 1975
  - Family Onychochilidae Koken, 1925

=== Patellogastropoda ===
This revised taxonomy of the Patellogastropoda (the true limpets) is based on research by Nakano & Ozawa (2007). The Acmaeidae is treated as a synonym of Lottiidae; the subfamily Pectinodontinae is elevated to Pectinodontidae; a new family Eoacmaeidae with the new type genus Eoacmaea is established. The remaining three families (Neolepetopsidae, Daminilidae, Lepetopsidae) are moved into the Lottioidea, like this:

- superfamily Eoacmaeoidea
  - family Eoacmaeidae
- superfamily Patelloidea
  - family Patellidae
- superfamily Lottioidea
  - family Nacellidae
  - family Lepetidae
  - family Pectinodontidae
  - family Lottiidae
  - family Neolepetopsidae
  - † family Damilinidae
  - † family Lepetopsidae

=== Vetigastropoda ===
Geiger (2009) elevated the subfamily Depressizoninae to family level as Depressizonidae. Also two subfamilies (the Larocheinae from the Scissurellidae, and the Temnocinclinae from the Sutilizonidae) were upgraded to family level as the Larocheidae and the Temnocinclidae.

- Superfamily Lepetodriloidea
  - Family Lepetodrilidae
  - Family Clypeosectidae
  - Family Sutilizonidae
  - Family Temnocinclidae
- Superfamily Scissurelloidea
  - Family Scissurellidae
  - Family Larocheidae
  - Family Anatomidae
  - Family Depressizonidae

The superfamily Trochoidea was redefined by Williams et al. (2008) and the superfamily Turbinoidea is no longer used. Phasianelloidea and Angarioidea were created as new superfamilies.

Trochoidea

- Trochidae
- Turbinidae
- Solariellidae
- Calliostomatidae
- Liotiidae
- † Family Elasmonematidae
- † Family Eucochlidae
- † Family Microdomatidae
- † Family Proconulidae
- † Family Tychobraheidae
- † Family Velainellidae

Phasianelloidea

- Phasianellidae
- Colloniidae

Angarioidea

- Angariidae - monotypic with Angaria
- Areneidae (probable placement)

==== Neomphalina ====
The superfamily Neomphaloidea was previously regarded as belonging within the clade Vetigastropoda. Molecular phylogeny has shown however that it belongs in its own clade, Neomphalina, which is endemic to deep-sea hydrothermal vent habitat. The clade Neomphalina appears to be basal to the Vetigastropoda. Neomphalina is a monophyletic clade, however, its exact relationship among the gastropods is uncertain.

=== Neritimorpha ===
Bandel (2007) described four new families within the Neritopsoidea. He classified Neritopsoidea in the order Neritoina within the superorder Cycloneritimorpha and within the subclass Neritimorpha. Bandel (2007) recognizes Natisopsinae (in Neritopsidae by Bouchet & Rocrois 2005) at the family level, as Naticopsidae. Bandel's classification looks like this:

superfamily Neritopsoidea

- family Neritopsidae
- † Fedaiellidae Bandel, 2007
- † family Delphinulopsidae
- † family Cortinellidae
- † Palaeonaricidae Bandel, 2007
- † Naticopsidae - Natisopsinae (in Neritopsidae by Bouchet & Rocroid 2005) is recognized at family level by Bandel (2007).
- † Tricolnaticopsidae Bandel, 2007
- † Scalaneritinidae Bandel, 2007
- † family Plagiothyridae
- † family Pseudorthonychiidae
- family Titiscaniidae

=== Caenogastropoda ===
The family Provannidae was moved to the superfamily Abyssochrysoidea Tomlin, 1927. In addition, a new family Hokkaidoconchidae Kaim, Jenkins & Warén, 2008 was named.

- superfamily Abyssochrysoidea
  - family Provannidae
  - family Hokkaidoconchidae

The subfamily Semisulcospirinae, within the Pleuroceridae, was elevated to the family level Semisulcospiridae by Strong & Köhler (2009).

- superfamily Cerithioidea
  - family Pleuroceridae
  - family Semisulcospiridae
  - and others

Bandel (2006) made numerous changes in the following clades: Cerithimorpha/Cerithioidea, Turritellimorpha/Turritelloidea, Murchisonimorpha/Orthonematoidea, Campanilimorpha/Campaniloidea and Ampullinoidea, Vermetimorpha/Vermetoidea.

Fehse (2007) elevated both the subfamily Pediculariinae and the tribe Eocypraeini (which were previously in the family Ovulidae) to family level, based on both morphological research and molecular phylogeny research. Families within Cypraeoidea are now as follows:

- superfamily Cypraeoidea
  - family Cypraeidae
  - family Eocypraeidae
  - family Ovulidae
  - family Pediculariidae

Within the Tonnoidea, Beu (2008) raised the subfamily Cassinae to the rank of family: Cassidae Latreille, 1825.

Bouchet et al. (2011) updated the taxonomy of the superfamily Conoidea:

- New family Horaiclavidae Bouchet, Kantor, Sysoev & Puillandre, 2011
- Some subfamilies were elevated to families
- The polyphyletic family Turridae was split up in 13 monophyletic families by raising a number of subfamilies to the rank of family.

In 2012, within the Conoidea, a new family Bouchetispiridae Kantor, Strong & Puillandre, 2012 that includes one genus Bouchetispira Kantor, Strong & Puillandre, 2012 and one species Bouchetispira vitrea Kantor, Strong & Puillandre, 2012, was discovered.

In 2015, in the Journal of Molluscan Studies, Puillandre, Duda, Meyer, Olivera & Bouchet presented a new classification for the old genus Conus. Using 329 species, the authors carried out molecular phylogenetic analyses. The results suggested that the authors should place all cone snails in a single family, Conidae, containing four genera: Conus, Conasprella, Profundiconus and Californiconus. The authors group 85% of all known cone snail species under Conus, They recognize 57 subgenera within Conus, and 11 subgenera within the genus Conasprella. .

=== Heterobranchia ===
Janssen (2005) established a new family, Praecuvierinidae.

Gosliner et al. (2007) elevated the subfamily Babakininae to the family level as Babakinidae.

Golding et al. (2007) established new families within the Amphiboloidea:

- Maningrididae Golding, Ponder & Byrne, 2007
- Phallomedusidae Golding, Ponder & Byrne, 2007

Uit de Weerd (2008) moved two families Urocoptidae and Cerionidae to the newly established superfamily Urocoptoidea, based on molecular phylogeny research as follows:

superfamily Urocoptoidea

- family Urocoptidae
- family Cerionidae

Other authors also made numerous taxonomic changes within Orthalicoidea in 2009-2012.

Schrödl & Neusser (2010) rearranged the taxonomy of the Acochlidiacea.

Swennen & Buatip (2009) described a new family Aitengidae, which was later moved to Acochlidiacea by Jörger et al. (2010).

Malaquias et al. (2009) rearranged the taxonomy of the Cephalaspidea sensu lato: reinstated Architectibranchia, reinstated Runcinacea, reinstated Scaphandridae as a valid family, but they did not use superfamilies.

Subsequently, Malaquias (2010) moved Bullacta exarata (formerly the only member of Bullactidae) into the family Haminoeidae.

Sutcharit et al. (2010) established a new family Diapheridae within the Streptaxoidea in 2010.

Jörger et al. (2010) redefined major groups of Heterobranchia and created the new clades Euopisthobranchia and Panpulmonata.

Maeda et al. (2010) confirmed the placement of Cylindrobulla within the Sacoglossa.

Thompson (2010) redefined subfamilies in Spiraxidae, moving Euglandininae and Streptostylinae (from where they had been in the Oleacinidae per Bouchet & Rocroi (2005)) so that they became subfamilies of Spiraxidae.

Johnson (2011) resurrected the family Cadlinidae.

Thompson (2012) established a new family, Epirobiidae.

Thompson & Naranjo-García (2012) described a new family Echinichidae within Xanthonychoidea.

Prestonellinae was formally described as a new subfamily within Bothriembryontidae in 2016.

== Proposals and research ==
- Based on nucleotide sequences of mitochondrial genomes Grande et al. (2008) proposed these changes:
  - Pulmonata is polyphyletic
  - Euthyneura is not monophyletic because the Pyramidelloidea should be included within the Euthyneura
  - Opisthobranchia is not monophyletic because Siphonaria pectinata should be recognized as a member of the Opisthobranchia
- Peter J. Wagner considers Isospiridae to be a synonym of Cyrtonellidae within the Tergomya, The Paleobiology Database has adapted this as yet (February 2010) unpublished opinion by Wagner. This alternate taxonomy is as: Tergomya, Cyrtonellida, Cyrtonellidae.

== See also ==
- List of gastropods described in the 2000s
- List of gastropods described in 2010
- List of gastropods described in 2011
