= Orthogastropoda =

Scientific classification
- Kingdom: Animalia
- Phylum: Mollusca
- Class: Gastropoda
- Subclass: Orthogastropoda

Historic group of molluscs

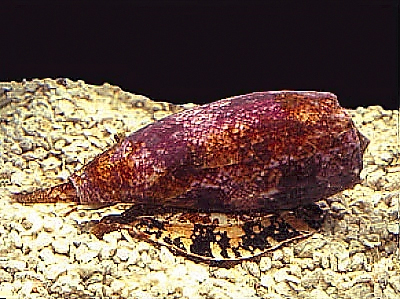
Conus geographus (a marine snail)

Orthogastropoda was a major taxonomic grouping of snails and slugs, an extremely large subclass within the huge class Gastropoda according to the older taxonomy of the Gastropoda (Ponder & Lindberg, 1997).

This taxon is no longer used according to the taxonomy of the Gastropoda by Bouchet & Rocroi, 2005.

Ponder and Lindberg (1997) in the book The Southern Synthesis, showed the Orthogastropoda as one of two subclasses of the Gastropoda, the other subclass being a very much smaller group called the Eogastropoda, which contained only 5 families of true limpets.

This subclass, Orthogastropoda, which one perhaps could call the true snails, was defined most concisely as all gastropods which were not members of Patellogastropoda, the true limpets.

The Orthogastropoda appeared to form a clade which was supported by unambiguous synapomorphies. These synapomorphies (a series of characteristics that appear in its members but not in the other forms it diverged from) were the identifying characteristics of the clade.

Some of the characteristics were:

- eyes with a vitreous body on eyestalks.
- paired jaws, with their position free from the buccal mass
- a single kidney on the right side of pericardium
- a flexoglossate radula (with a flexible radular membrane). The radula is the snail's tongue, used as a rasping tool.
- unpaired osphradium (olfactory organ).
- lateral ciliated zones of osphradium
- a single left hypobranchial gland (on organ at gill, which releases secretions, such as the reddish dye Tyrian purple).
- an unpaired ctenidium (a comblike respiratory structure in certain mollusks)

== Taxonomy ==
The following is based on the somewhat out-dated taxonomy of the Gastropoda (Ponder & Lindberg, 1997). For the most up-to-date system of gastropod taxonomy, please see Taxonomy of the Gastropoda (Bouchet & Rocroi, 2005).

Superorder Cocculiniformia Haszprunar, 1987

- Superfamily Cocculinoidea Dall, 1882
- Superfamily Lepetelloidea Dall, 1882 (deep sea limpets)

Superorder incertae sedis (Hot Vent Taxa)

- Order Neomphaloida Sitnikova & Starobogatov, 1983
  - Superfamily Neomphaloidea McLean, 1981 (hydrothermal vent limpets)
  - Superfamily Peltospiroidea McLean, 1989

Superorder Vetigastropoda Salvini-Plawen, 1989 (limpets)

- Superfamily Fissurelloidea Flemming, 1822 (keyhole limpets)
- Superfamily Haliotoidea Rafinesque, 1815 (abalones)
- Superfamily Lepetodriloidea McLean, 1988 (hydrothermal vent limpets)
- Superfamily Pleurotomarioidea Swainson, 1840 (slit shells)
- Superfamily Seguenzioidea Verrill, 1884
- Superfamily Trochoidea Rafinesque, 1815 (top shells)

Superorder Neritaemorphi Koken, 1896

- Order Neritopsina Cox & Knight, 1960
  - Superfamily Neritoidea Lamarck, 1809

Superorder Caenogastropoda Cox, 1960

- Order Architaenioglossa Haller, 1890
  - Superfamily Ampullarioidea J.E. Gray, 1824
  - Superfamily Cyclophoroidea J.E. Gray, 1847 (terrestrial)
- Order Sorbeoconcha Ponder & Lindberg, 1997
  - Suborder Cerithiimorpha Golikov & Starobogatov, 1975
    - Superfamily Spanionematoidea
  - Suborder Hypsogastropoda Ponder & Lindberg, 1997
    - Infraorder Littorinimorpha Golikov & Starobogatov, 1975
      - Superfamily Calyptraeoidea Lamarck, 1809
      - Superfamily Capuloidea J. Fleming, 1822
      - Superfamily Carinarioidea Blainville, 1818
      - Superfamily Cingulopsoidea Fretter & Patil, 1958
      - Superfamily Cypraeoidea Rafinesque, 1815 (cowries)
      - Superfamily Ficoidea Meek, 1864
      - Superfamily Laubierinoidea Warén & Bouchet, 1990
      - Superfamily Littorinoidea (Children), 1834 (periwinkles)
      - Superfamily Naticoidea Forbes, 1838 (moon shells)
      - Superfamily Rissooidea J.E. Gray, 1847 (Risso shells)
      - Superfamily Stromboidea Rafinesque, 1815 (true conchs)
      - Superfamily Tonnoidea Suter, 1913
      - Superfamily Trivioidea Troschel, 1863
      - Superfamily Vanikoroidea J.E. Gray, 1840
      - Superfamily Velutinoidea J.E. Gray, 1840
      - Superfamily Vermetoidea Rafinesque, 1815 (worm shells)
      - Superfamily Xenophoroidea Troschel, 1852 (carrier shells)
    - Infraorder Neogastropoda Thiele, 1929
      - Superfamily Buccinoidea (whelks, false tritions)
      - Superfamily Cancellarioidea Forbes & Hanley, 1851
      - Superfamily Conoidea Rafinesque, 1815
      - Superfamily Muricoidea Rafinesque, 1815
    - Infraorder Ptenoglossa J.E. Gray, 1853
      - Superfamily Eulimoidea Philippi, 1853
      - Superfamily Janthinoidea Lamarck, 1812
      - Superfamily Triphoroidea J.E. Gray, 1847
  - Suborder Discopoda P. Fischer, 1884 - sometimes included in Cerithiimorpha
    - Superfamily Campaniloidea Douvillé, 1904
    - Superfamily Cerithioidea Férussac, 1822
  - Suborder Murchisoniina Cox & Knight, 1960
    - Superfamily Loxonematoidea Koken, 1889

Superorder Heterobranchia J.E. Gray, 1840

- Order Heterostropha P. Fischer, 1885
  - Superfamily Architectonicoidea J.E. Gray, 1840
    - Family Architectonicidae Gray, 1850
  - Superfamily Omalogyroidea G.O. Sars, 1878
  - Superfamily Pyramidelloidea J.E. Gray, 1840
  - Superfamily Rissoelloidea J.E. Gray, 1850
  - Superfamily Valvatoidea J.E. Gray, 1840
- Order Opisthobranchia Milne-Edwards, 1848
  - Suborder Nudibranchia Blainville, 1814 (nudibranchs)
    - Infraorder Anthobranchia Férussac, 1819
      - Superfamily Doridoidea Rafinesque, 1815
      - Superfamily Doridoxoidea Bergh, 1900
      - Superfamily Onchidoridoidea Alder & Hancock, 1845
      - Superfamily Polyceroidea Alder & Hancock, 1845
    - Infraorder Cladobranchia Willan & Morton, 1984
      - Superfamily Aeolidioidea J.E. Gray, 1827
      - Superfamily Arminoidea Rafinesque, 1814
      - Superfamily Dendronotoidea Allman, 1845
      - Superfamily Metarminoidea Odhner in Franc, 1968
  - Suborder Anaspidea P. Fischer, 1883 (sea hares)
    - Superfamily Akeroidea Pilsbry, 1893
    - Superfamily Aplysioidea Lamarck, 1809
  - Suborder Cephalaspidea P. Fischer, 1883
    - Superfamily Acteonoidea D'Orbigny, 1835
    - Superfamily Bulloidea Lamarck, 1801
    - Superfamily Cylindrobulloidea Thiele, 1931
    - Superfamily Diaphanoidea Odhner, 1914
    - Superfamily Haminoeoidea Pilsbry, 1895
    - Superfamily Philinoidea J.E. Gray, 1850
    - Superfamily Ringiculoidea Philippi, 1853
  - Suborder Gymnosomata Blainville, 1824 (sea angels)
  - Suborder Notaspidea P. Fischer, 1883
    - Superfamily Pleurobranchoidea Férussac, 1822
    - Superfamily Tylodinoidea J.E. Gray, 1847
  - Suborder Sacoglossa Von Ihering, 1876
    - Superfamily Oxynooidea H. Adams & A. Adams, 1854
  - Suborder Thecosomata Blainville, 1824 (sea butterflies)
    - Infraorder Euthecosomata
      - Superfamily Limacinoidea
      - Superfamily Cavolinioidea
    - Infraorder Pseudothecosomata
      - Superfamily Peraclidoidea
      - Superfamily Cymbulioidea
- Order Pulmonata Cuvier in Blainville, 1814 (pulmonates)
  - Subinfraorder Orthurethra
    - Superfamily Achatinelloidea Gulick, 1873
    - Superfamily Cochlicopoidea Pilsbry, 1900
    - Superfamily Partuloidea Pilsbry, 1900
    - Superfamily Pupilloidea Turton, 1831
  - Subinfraorder Sigmurethra
    - Superfamily Acavoidea Pilsbry, 1895
    - Superfamily Achatinoidea Swainson, 1840
    - Superfamily Aillyoidea Baker, 1960
    - Superfamily Arionoidea J.E. Gray in Turnton, 1840
    - Superfamily Buliminoidea Clessin, 1879
    - Superfamily Camaenoidea Pilsbry, 1895
    - Superfamily Clausilioidea Mörch, 1864
    - Superfamily Dyakioidea Gude & Woodward, 1921
    - Superfamily Gastrodontoidea Tryon, 1866
    - Superfamily Helicoidea Rafinesque, 1815
    - Superfamily Helixarionoidea Bourguignat, 1877
    - Superfamily Limacoidea Rafinesque, 1815
    - Superfamily Oleacinoidea H. Adams & A. Adams, 1855
    - Superfamily Orthalicoidea Albers-Martens, 1860
    - Superfamily Plectopylidoidea Moellendorf, 1900
    - Superfamily Polygyroidea Pilsbry, 1894
    - Superfamily Punctoidea Morse, 1864
    - Superfamily Rhytidoidea Pilsbry, 1893
    - Superfamily Sagdidoidera Pilsbry, 1895
    - Superfamily Staffordioidea Thiele, 1931
    - Superfamily Streptaxoidea J.E. Gray, 1806
    - Superfamily Strophocheiloidea Thiele, 1926
    - Superfamily Trigonochlamydoidea Hese, 1882
    - Superfamily Zonitoidea Mörch, 1864
  - Infraorder Acteophila Dall, 1885
    - Superfamily Melampoidea Stimpson, 1851
  - Infraorder Trimusculiformes Minichev & Starobogatov, 1975
    - Superfamily Trimusculoidea Zilch, 1959
  - Infraorder Stylommatophora A. Schmidt, 1856 (land snails)
  - Suborder Basommatophora Keferstein in Bronn, 1864 (freshwater pulmonates)
    - Superfamily Acroloxoidea Thiele, 1931
    - Superfamily Amphiboloidea J.E. Gray, 1840
    - Superfamily Chilinoidea H. Adams & A. Adams, 1855
    - Superfamily Glacidorboidea Ponder, 1986
    - Superfamily Lymnaeoidea Rafinesque, 1815
    - Superfamily Planorboidea Rafinesque, 1815
    - Superfamily Siphonarioidea J.E. Gray, 1840
  - Suborder Eupulmonata Haszprunar & Huber, 1990
  - Suborder Systellommatophora Pilsbry, 1948
    - Superfamily Onchidioidea Rafinesque, 1815
    - Superfamily Otinoidea H. Adams & A. Adams, 1855
    - Superfamily Rathouisioidea Sarasin, 1889
