= Sahlingia xandaros =

Scientific classification
- Kingdom: Animalia
- Phylum: Mollusca
- Class: Gastropoda
- Subclass: Vetigastropoda
- Genus: Sahlingia
- Species: S. xandaros

Binomial name
- Sahlingia xandaros Warén & Bouchet, 2001

Species of gastropod

Sahlingia xandaros is a species of sea snail, a marine gastropod mollusk in the clade Vetigastropoda.
