= Eucochlidae =

Scientific classification
- Kingdom: Animalia
- Phylum: Mollusca
- Class: Gastropoda
- Subclass: Vetigastropoda
- Order: Trochida
- Superfamily: Trochoidea
- Family: †Eucochlidae; Bandel, 2002

Genera
- See text

Extinct family of gastropods

Eucochlidae is an extinct family of fossil sea snails, marine gastropod molluscs in the superfamily Trochoidea (according to the taxonomy of the Gastropoda by Bouchet & Rocroi, 2005). This family has no subfamilies.

== Genera ==
Genera within the family Eucochlidae include:

- Eucochlis – the type genus
