= Callonema =

Callonema may refer to:

- Callonema (alga), a genus in the family Stylonemataceae
- Callonema (gastropod), a genus in the family Elasmonematidae

== See also ==
- Calonema, a synonym for Caladenia, the spider orchids
