= Trochoidea (unassigned) =

Scientific classification
- Kingdom: Animalia
- Phylum: Mollusca
- Class: Gastropoda
- Subclass: Vetigastropoda
- Order: Trochida
- Superfamily: Trochoidea
- Family: Trochoidea (unassigned)

Genera
- See text

Family of gastropods

Trochoidea (unassigned) is a family of sea snails, marine gastropod mollusks in the superfamily Trochoidea.

== Genera ==
- Lodderena Iredale, 1924
