= Velainellidae =

Scientific classification
- Kingdom: Animalia
- Phylum: Mollusca
- Class: Gastropoda
- Subclass: Vetigastropoda
- Order: Trochida
- Superfamily: Trochoidea
- Family: †Velainellidae; Vasseur, 1880

Genera
- Velainella

Extinct family of gastropods

Velainellidae is a very small taxonomic family of fossil sea snails, marine gastropod mollusks in the superfamily Trochoidea, the top snails, turban snails and their allies.

== Genera ==
This family contains only one genus: the Eocene genus Velainella, named by Vasseur 1880 and found in France.

== Description ==
Velainella has a long, narrow, almost straight-side shell with a smooth-lipped oval aperture.

== Taxonomy changes ==
Bouchet & Rocroi, 2005 included the Velainellidae in the vetigastropod superfamily Trochoidea, leaving the rank of the Vetigastropoda undecided. Previously W. F. Ponder and A. Warén 1988 put the Velainellidae in the Loxonematoidea (Koken 1889) a superfamily in the Mesogastropoda, Earlier, J. B. Knight, et al., 1960 in the Treatise included the Velainellidae, with Vellainella, in the Trochacea, as does Bouchet & Rocroi, 2005, but within the Archaeogastropoda. Trochacea is the original spelling for what is now Trochoidea.
