= Sahlingia =

Sahlingia may refer to:

- Sahlingia (gastropod), a mollusc genus
- Sahlingia (alga), a red alga genus in the family Erythrotrichiaceae
