= Proconulidae =

Scientific classification
- Kingdom: Animalia
- Phylum: Mollusca
- Class: Gastropoda
- Subclass: Vetigastropoda
- Order: Trochida
- Superfamily: Trochoidea
- Family: †Proconulidae; Cox, 1960

Extinct family of gastropods

Proconulidae is an extinct family of sea snails, marinegastropod mollusks in the clade Vetigastropoda (according to the taxonomy of the Gastropoda by Bouchet & Rocroi, 2005). This family has no subfamilies.
