= Tychobraheidae =

Scientific classification
- Kingdom: Animalia
- Phylum: Mollusca
- Class: Gastropoda
- Subclass: Vetigastropoda
- Order: Trochida
- Superfamily: Trochoidea
- Family: †Tychobraheidae; Horný, 1992

Genera
- See text

Extinct family of gastropods

Tychobraheidae is an extinct family of fossil sea snails, marine gastropod mollusks in the superfamily Trochoidea, the top shells and their allies, according to the taxonomy of the Gastropoda by Bouchet & Rocroi, 2005). This family has no subfamilies.

== Genera ==
Genera within the family Tychobraheidae include:

- Tychobrahea, the type genus
- Asinomphalus
- Komenskyspira
- Micromphalus
