= Peruneloidea =

Scientific classification
- Kingdom: Animalia
- Phylum: Mollusca
- Class: Gastropoda
- Subclass: Caenogastropoda
- Order: incertae sedis
- Superfamily: †Peruneloidea; Frýda & Bandel

Families
- See text

Extinct superfamily of gastropods

Peruneloidea is an extinct superfamily of fossil sea snails, marine gastropod molluscs in the clade Caenogastropoda.

== Families ==
Families within the superfamily Peruneloidea are as follows:

- † Family Perunelidae
- † Family Chuchlinidae
- † Family Imoglobidae
- † Family Sphaerodomidae
