= Scoliostomatidae =

Scientific classification
- Kingdom: Animalia
- Phylum: Mollusca
- Class: Gastropoda
- Subclass: incertae sedis
- Family: †Scoliostomatidae; Frýda, Blodgett & Lenz, 2002

Extinct family of gastropods

Scoliostomatidae is an extinct family of Paleozoic fossil sea snails, marine gastropod molluscs.

This family is unassigned to superfamily. This family consists of two following subfamilies (according to the taxonomy of the Gastropoda by Bouchet & Rocroi, 2005):

- Scoliostomatinae Frýda, Blodgett & Lenz, 2002
- Mitchelliinae Frýda, Blodgett & Lenz, 2002
