= Acanthonematidae =

Scientific classification
- Kingdom: Animalia
- Phylum: Mollusca
- Class: Gastropoda
- Subclass: Caenogastropoda
- Order: incertae sedis
- Family: †Acanthonematidae; Wenz, 1938

Extinct family of gastropods

Acanthonematidae is an extinct family of sea snails, marine gastropod molluscs in the clade Caenogastropoda.

According to the taxonomy of the Gastropoda by Bouchet & Rocroi (2005) the family Canterburyellidae has no subfamilies. It is unassigned to superfamily.
