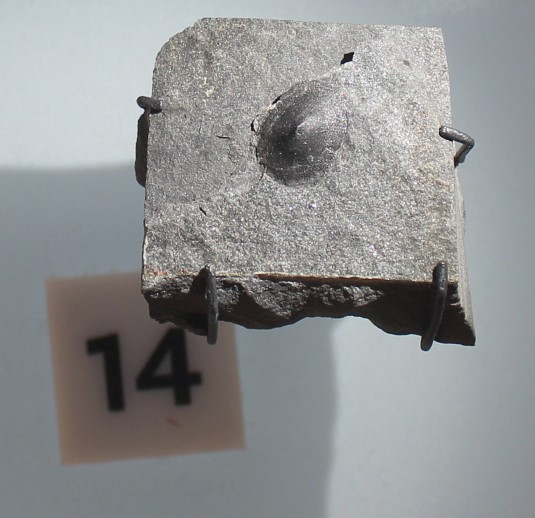
- Protoconchoides varians fossil, National Museum of Natural History

Scientific classification
- Kingdom: Animalia
- Phylum: Mollusca
- Class: incertae sedis
- Family: †Protoconchoididae; Geyer, 1994

Genera
- †Kornoutella Horný, 1997; †Mytoconula Horný, 2009; †Patelliconus Horný, 1961; †Protoconchoides Shaw, 1962

Synonyms
- Patelliconidae Frýda, 1998

= Protoconchoididae =

Extinct family of gastropods

Protoconchoididae is an extinct family of Paleozoic molluscs of uncertain taxonomic position, i.e. they were either Gastropoda or Monoplacophora.

== Taxonomy ==
The taxonomy of the Gastropoda by Bouchet & Rocroi, 2005 categorizes Protoconchoididae within the Paleozoic molluscs of uncertain systematic position. This family is unassigned to superfamily. This family has no subfamilies.

== Genera ==
Genera in the family Protoconchoididae include:

- †Kornoutella Horný, 1997
- †Mytoconula Horný, 2009
- †Patelliconus Horný, 1961
- †Protoconchoides Shaw, 1962 - type genus of the family Protoconchoididae
