= Ladamarekiidae =

Scientific classification
- Kingdom: Animalia
- Phylum: Mollusca
- Class: incertae sedis
- Family: †Ladamarekiidae; Frýda, 1998

Genera
- See text

Extinct family of gastropods

Ladamarekiidae is an extinct family of Paleozoic fossil molluscs of uncertain position. it is not known if they are sea snails (Gastropoda, or Monoplacophora).

== Taxonomy ==
The taxonomy of the Gastropoda by Bouchet & Rocroi, 2005 categorizes Ladamarekiidae within the Paleozoic molluscs of uncertain systematic position. This family is unassigned to superfamily. This family has no subfamilies.

== Genera and species ==
Genera and species in the family Ladamarekiidae include:

- Ladamarekia Horný, 1992 - type genus of the family Ladamarekiidae
  - Ladamarekia miranda Horný, 1992
- Jardamarekia Frýda et al., 2011
  - Jardamarekia enigma Frýda et al., 2011
