= Schizogoniidae =

Scientific classification
- Kingdom: Animalia
- Phylum: Mollusca
- Class: Gastropoda
- (unranked): clade Vetigastropoda
- Family: Schizogoniidae Cox, 1960

Extinct family of gastropods

Schizogoniidae is an extinct family of fossil sea snails, marine gastropod molluscs in the clade Vetigastropoda (according to the taxonomy of the Gastropoda by Bouchet & Rocroi, 2005).

This family is unassigned to superfamily. This family has no subfamilies.

== Genera ==
Genera within the family Scizogoniidae include:

- Pseudowortheniella Bandel, 2009
- Schizogonium Koken, 1889 - the type genus
