= Isospiridae =

Scientific classification
- Kingdom: Animalia
- Phylum: Mollusca
- Class: Gastropoda
- Subclass: incertae sedis
- Family: †Isospiridae; Wangberg-Eriksson, 1964

Extinct family of gastropods

Isospiridae is an extinct family of fossil sea snails, Paleozoic gastropod molluscs.

This family is unassigned to superfamily. This family has no subfamilies according to the taxonomy by Bouchet & Rocroi (2005). It is classified as "Basal taxa that are certainly Gastropoda" by Bouchet & Rocroi (2005).

== Genera ==
- Isospira Koken, 1897 - type genus of the family Isospiridae. Species include:
  - Isospira bucanioides Koken, 1897
  - Isospira huttoni Cowper Reed, 1921
  - Isospira lepida Perner, 1903
  - Isospira nautilina Koken & Perner, 1925
  - Isospira reinwaldti Öpik, 1930
  - Isospira reticulatus Wängberg-Eriksson, 1964 - synonym: Isospira reticulata

== Taxonomy ==
Peter J. Wagner consider Isospiridae as synonym of Cyrtonellidae within Tergomya, The Paleobiology Database has become adatapted to this unpublished opinion by Wagner. This alternate taxonomy is as: Tergomya, Cyrtonellida, Cyrtonellidae.
