= Pommerozygiidae =

Scientific classification
- Kingdom: Animalia
- Phylum: Mollusca
- Class: Gastropoda
- Subclass: Caenogastropoda
- Superfamily: †Pseudozygopleuroidea
- Family: †Pommerozygiidae; Gründel, 1999

Extinct family of gastropods

Pommerozygiidae is an extinct family of sea snails, marine gastropod molluscs in the clade Hypsogastropoda.

According to the taxonomy of the Gastropoda by Bouchet & Rocroi (2005), the family Pommerozygiidae has no subfamilies. It is unassigned to a superfamily.
