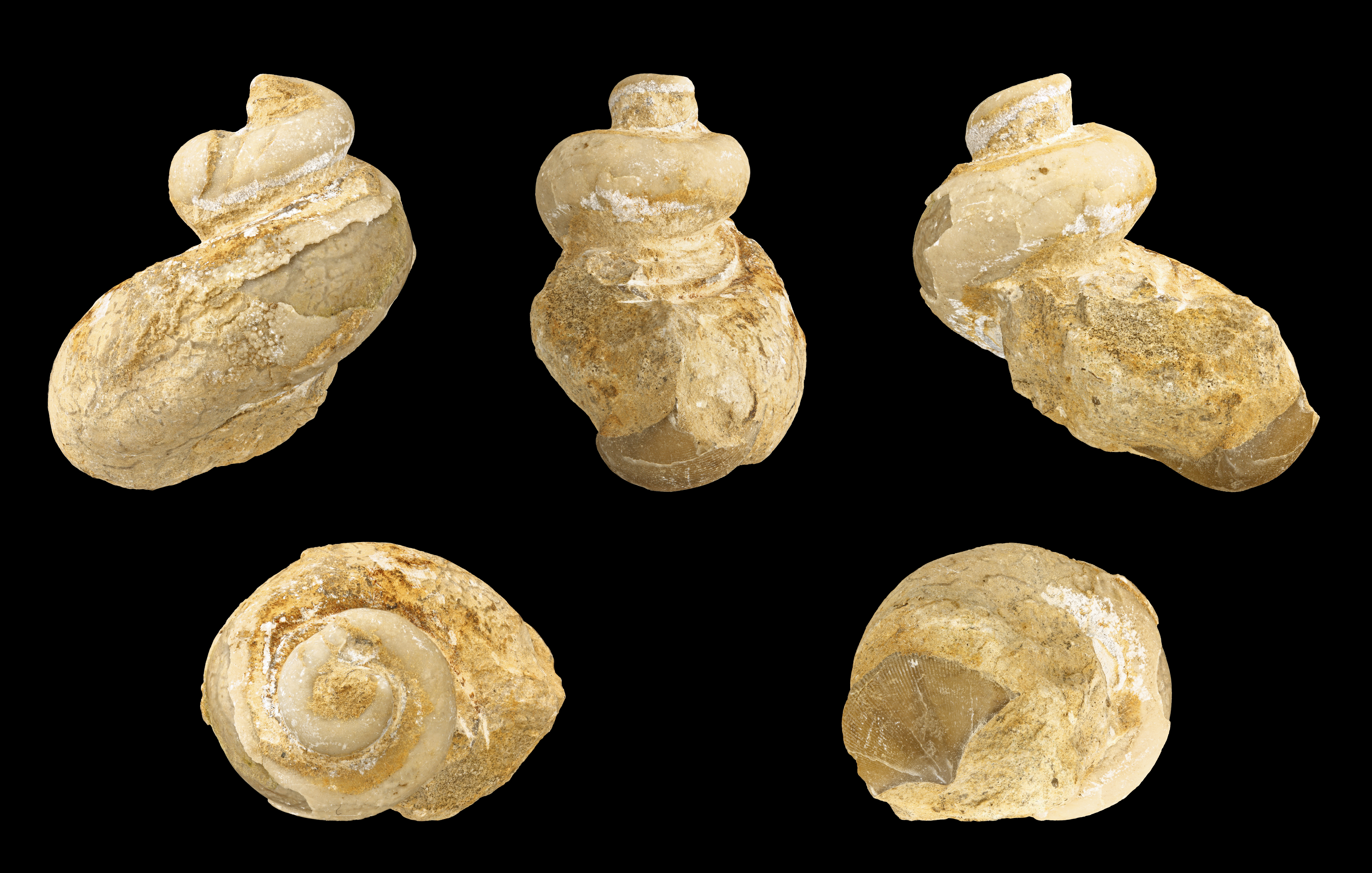
- Floyda concentrica Hall & Whitfield, 1873

Scientific classification
- Kingdom: Animalia
- Phylum: Mollusca
- Class: Gastropoda
- Subclass: Neritimorpha
- Superfamily: †Palaeotrochoidea; Knight, 1956
- Family: †Palaeotrochidae; Knight, 1956

Genera
- See text

= Palaeotrochidae =

Extinct family of gastropods

Palaeotrochidae is an extinct family of fossil snails, gastropod mollusks in the clade Neritimorpha according to the taxonomy of the Gastropoda (Bouchet & Rocroi, 2005).

This is the only family in the superfamily Palaeotrochoidea. This family has no subfamilies.

== Genera ==
Genera within the family Paleotrochidae include:

- Palaeotrochus Hall, 1879 - type genus
- Floyda Webster, 1905
- Turbonopsis Grabau and Shimer 1909
- Westerna Webster, 1905
- Westwooditrochus Cook 1998
