= Microdomatidae =

Scientific classification
- Kingdom: Animalia
- Phylum: Mollusca
- Class: Gastropoda
- Subclass: Vetigastropoda
- Order: Trochida
- Superfamily: Trochoidea
- Family: †Microdomatidae; Wenz, 1938

Genera
- See text

Family of molluscs (fossil)

Microdomatidae is an extinct family of fossil sea snails, marine gastropod mollusks in the superfamily Trochoidea. They were extant throughout Southeast Asia, Northern Europe, Venezuela, the United States, and Northern Mexico. Their fossil records span from the Early Devonian to the Early Triassic, approximately 411 to 251 million years ago.

== Appearance ==
The umbilicus of Microdomatidae snails was typically well-developed and often quite wide, forming a noticeable central depression or hollow on the underside of the shell. This feature helps distinguish them from some other fossil sea snails, where the umbilicus may be narrow or even absent.

== Taxonomy ==
This family consists of two following subfamilies:

- Microdomatinae Wenz, 1938
- Decorospirinae Blodgett & Frýda, 1999

== Genera ==
Genera within the family Microdomatidae include:

Subfamily Microdomatinae:

- Microdoma - type genus
- Limburgia

Subfamily Decorospirinae:

- Decorospira - type genus
- Dongiovannia
- Dutrochus
- Roemeriella

These subfamilies can be distinguished
