= Clisospiridae =

Scientific classification
- Kingdom: Animalia
- Phylum: Mollusca
- Class: Gastropoda
- Superfamily: †Clisospiroidea
- Family: †Clisospiridae; S. A. Miller, 1889

Extinct family of gastropod molluscs

Clisospiridae is an extinct taxonomic family of sea snails, marine gastropod molluscs.

This family consists of three following subfamilies (according to the taxonomy of the Gastropoda by Bouchet & Rocroi, 2005):

- Cliospirinae S. A. Miller, 1889 - synonym: Progalerinae Knight, 1956
- Atracurinae Horný, 1964
- Trochoclisinae Horný, 1964
