= Elasmonematidae =

Scientific classification
- Kingdom: Animalia
- Phylum: Mollusca
- Class: Gastropoda
- Subclass: Vetigastropoda
- Order: Trochida
- Superfamily: Trochoidea
- Family: †Elasmonematidae; Knight, 1956

Genera
- See text

Extinct family of gastropods

Elasmonematidae is an extinct family of gastropods in the clade Vetigastropoda (according to the taxonomy of the Gastropoda by Bouchet & Rocroi, 2005).

This family has no subfamilies.

== Genera ==
Genera within this family include:

- Elasmonema, the type genus, aka Callonema
- Anematina
- Discordichilus
- Hawletrochus
- Heidelbergeria
- Kimina
- Kyndalynia
- Streptotrochis
