= Imoglobidae =

Scientific classification
- Kingdom: Animalia
- Phylum: Mollusca
- Class: Gastropoda
- Subclass: Caenogastropoda
- Order: incertae sedis
- Superfamily: †Peruneloidea
- Family: †Imoglobidae; Nützel et al., 2000

Extinct family of gastropods

Imoglobidae is an extinct family of fossil sea snails, marine gastropod mollusks in the clade Caenogastropoda.
