= Nerrhenidae =

Scientific classification
- Kingdom: Animalia
- Phylum: Mollusca
- Class: Gastropoda
- Subclass: Neritimorpha
- Order: incertae sedis
- Superfamily: †Nerrhenoidea; Bandel & Heidelberger, 2001
- Family: †Nerrhenidae; Bandel & Heidelberger, 2001

Extinct family of gastropods

†Nerrhenidae is an extinct family of fossil sea snails, marine gastropod molluscs. Nerrhenidae is the only family in the superfamily Nerrhenoidea.

== Genera ==
Genera within the family Nerrhenidae include:

- Hessonia
- Nerrhena - the type genus
