= Acteoninoidea =

Scientific classification
- Kingdom: Animalia
- Phylum: Mollusca
- Class: Gastropoda
- Subclass: Caenogastropoda
- Superfamily: Acteoninoidea

Families
- See text

Extinct superfamily of gastropods

Acteoninoidea is an extinct superfamily of fossil sea snails, marine gastropod mollusks in the clade Caenogastropoda.

== Taxonomy ==
Families within the superfamily Acteoninoidea are as follows:

- † Family Acteoninidae
- † Family Anozygidae
- † Family Soleniscidae
