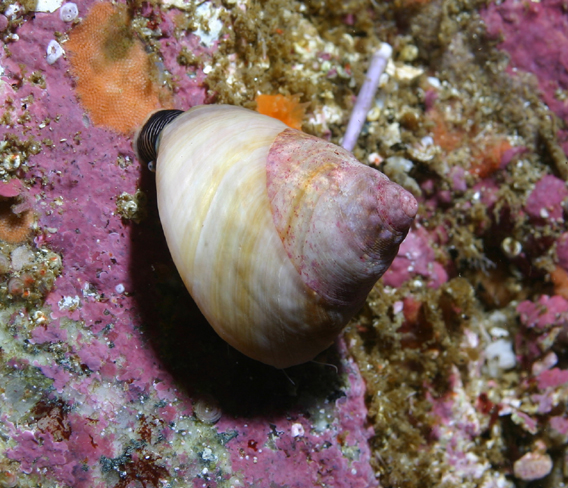
- A live individual of Tegula pulligo

Scientific classification
- Kingdom: Animalia
- Phylum: Mollusca
- Class: Gastropoda
- Subclass: Vetigastropoda
- Order: Trochida
- Superfamily: Trochoidea; Rafinesque, 1815

Families
- See text

Synonyms
- Angarioidea Gray, 1857; Phasianelloidea Swainson, 1840; Trochacea (suffix -oidea mandatory for a superfamily name following current ICZN art. 29.2.); Turbinoidea Rafinesque, 1815

= Trochoidea (superfamily) =

Trochoidea Temporal range: Ordovician–Recent

Superfamily of sea snails

Trochoidea is a superfamily of small to very large vetigastropod sea snails with gills and an operculum. Species within this superfamily have nacre as the inner shell layer. The families within this superfamily include the Trochidae, the top snails. This superfamily is the largest vetigastropodan superfamily, containing more than 2,000 species.

== Taxonomy ==
=== 2005 taxonomy ===
This superfamily consisted of nine following families (according to the taxonomy of the Gastropoda by Bouchet & Rocroi, 2005):

- Trochidae Rafinesque, 1815
- Calliostomatidae Thiele, 1924 (1847)
- † Elasmonematidae Knight, 1956
- † Eucochlidae Bandel, 2002
- † Microdomatidae Wenz, 1938
- † Proconulidae Cox, 1960
- Solariellidae Powell, 1951 – synonym: Minoliinae Kuroda, Habe & Oyama, 1971
- † Tychobraheidae Horný, 1992
- † Velainellidae Vasseur, 1880

=== 2017 taxonomy ===
Williams et al. (2008) have made further refinements to the taxonomy of Trochoidea. The revised taxonomy as defined by Bouchet et al. (2017) resulted in the following families. The fossil families, tentatively included in this list, are based on Tracey et al. (1993)

- Angariidae Gray, 1857
- † Anomphalidae Wenz, 1938
- † Araeonematidae Nützel, 2012
- Areneidae McLean, 2012
- Calliostomatidae Thiele, 1924 (1847)
- Colloniidae Cossmann, 1917
- Conradiidae Golikov & Starobogatov, 1987
- † Elasmonematidae Knight, 1956
- † Epulotrochidae Gründel, Keupp & Lang, 2017
- † Eucochlidae Bandel, 2002
- Liotiidae Gray, 1850
- Margaritidae Thiele, 1924
- †Metriomphalidae Gründel, Keupp & Lang, 2017
- † Microdomatidae Wenz, 1938
- †Nododelphinulidae Cox, 1960
- Phasianellidae Swainson, 1840
- † Proconulidae Cox, 1960
- † Sclarotrardidae Gründel, Keupp & Lang, 2017
- Skeneidae Clark W., 1851
- Solariellidae Powell, 1951
- Tegulidae Kuroda, Habe & Oyama, 1971
- Trochidae Rafinesque, 1815
- Turbinidae Rafinesque, 1815
- † Tychobraheidae Horný, 1992
- † Velainellidae Vasseur, 1880
- Trochoidea (unassigned)

Unassigned to a family:

- Margarella Thiele, 1893 – Margarella rosea belongs to Cantharidinae, but Margarella antarctica belongs to Calliostomatidae/Thysanodontinae as Carinastele antarctica.

Nomen dubium

- Ataphridae Cossmann, 1915

Families brought into synonymy

- Crosseolidae Hickman, 2013: synonym of Conradiidae Golikov & Starobogatov, 1987
- Cyclostrematidae P. Fischer, 1865: synonym of Liotiidae Gray, 1850
- Delphinulidae Stoliczka, 1868: synonym of Angariidae Gray, 1857
- Gazidae Hickman & McLean, 1990: synonym of Margaritidae Thiele, 1924
- Minoliinae Kuroda, Habe & Oyama, 1971: synonym of Solariellidae Powell, 1951
- † Parataphrinae Calzada, 1989: synonym of † Proconulidae Cox, 1960
- Stomatellidae Gray, 1840: synonym of Stomatellinae Gray, 1840
- Stomatiidae Carpenter, 1861: synonym of Stomatellinae Gray, 1840
- Tricoliidae Woodring, 1928: synonym of Tricoliinae Woodring, 1928 (rank change)
