= David R. Lindberg =

American malacologist

- Born: 1948 (age 77–78)
- Scientific career
- Fields: malacology
- Institutions: University of California, Berkeley

David R. Lindberg (1948, U.S.A.) is an American malacologist and professor of integrative biology at the University of California, Berkeley. He is also the Curator for the University of California Museum of Paleontology and co-editor of the journal Molecular Systematics and Phylogeography of Mollusks.

Much of his work has focused on sea snails, specifically on limpets, on the phylogeny of the Patellogastropoda, and various other gastropod groups.

Lindberg renamed the order Docoglossa to Patellogastropoda in 1986. He is also notable for naming the subclass Eogastropoda, and proposing that the taxonomy of the Gastropoda be rewritten in terms of strictly monophyletic groups.

== See also ==
- Taxonomy of the Gastropoda (Ponder & Lindberg, 1997)
