= Oriostomatidae =

Scientific classification
- Kingdom: Animalia
- Phylum: Mollusca
- Class: Gastropoda
- Superfamily: †Oriostomatoidea
- Family: †Oriostomatidae; Koken, 1896

Genera
- See text

Extinct family of gastropods

Oriostomatidae is an extinct family of fossil sea snails, marine gastropod molluscs.

== Genera ==
Genera within the family Oriostomatidae include:

- Australonema
- Beraunia
- Didymalgia
- Dormella
- Gemininodoa
- Hecatastoma
- Omphalonema
- Oriomphalus
- Oriostoma
- Tophicola
- Tubogyra
