= Eogastropoda =

Historic group of molluscs

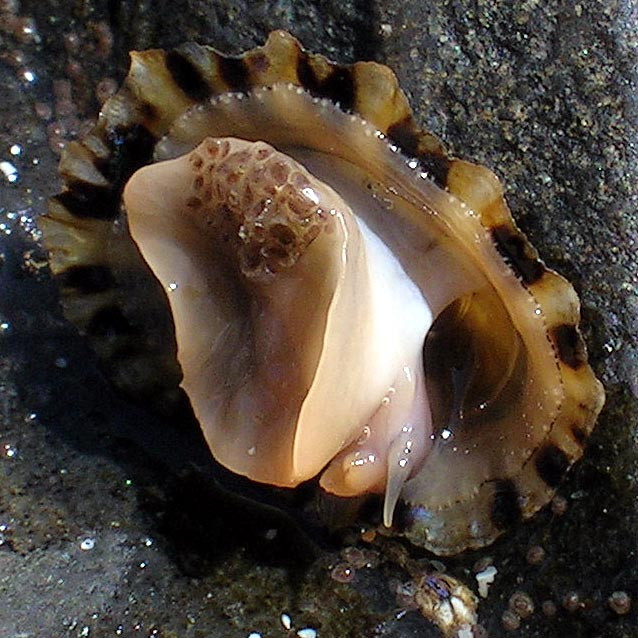

Eogastropoda was a previously used taxonomic category of snails or gastropods, a subclass which was erected by Ponder and Lindberg in 1997. It was one of two great divisions (subclasses) of the class Gastropoda, the snails. The other subclass of gastropods was the Orthogastropoda.

Eogastropoda were the more primitive of the two subclasses, representing a much older line of gastropods. This subclass contained all of the true limpets.

== Orders ==
Orders within the Eogastropoda consisted of:

- Patellogastropoda
- Euomphalina (fossil)
- Neomphalida
