= Cyrtoneritimorpha =

Cyrtoneritimorpha Temporal range: Early Ordovician–Late Permian

Scientific classification
- Kingdom: Animalia
- Phylum: Mollusca
- Class: Gastropoda
- Subclass: Neritimorpha
- Clade: †Cyrtoneritimorpha

Families
- Orthonychiidae; Vltaviellidae

Extinct clade of gastropods

Cyrtoneritimorpha, also Cyrtoneritida, is a clade of fossil sea snails, marine gastropod mollusks within the clade Neritimorpha.

This order contains two extinct families: Orthonychiidae and Vltaviellidae.
