= Sphaerodomidae =

Scientific classification
- Kingdom: Animalia
- Phylum: Mollusca
- Class: Gastropoda
- Subclass: Caenogastropoda
- Order: incertae sedis
- Superfamily: †Peruneloidea
- Family: †Sphaerodomidae; Bandel, 2002

Extinct family of gastropods

Sphaerodomidae is an extinct family of fossil sea snails, marine gastropod mollusks in the clade Caenogastropoda.
