= Crassimarginatidae =

Scientific classification
- Kingdom: Animalia
- Phylum: Mollusca
- Class: Gastropoda
- Subclass: incertae sedis
- Family: †Crassimarginatidae; Frýda, Blodgett & Lenz., 2002

Extinct family of gastropods

Crassimarginatidae is an extinct family of fossil sea snails, Paleozoic gastropod molluscs.

This family is unassigned to superfamily. This family has no subfamilies.
