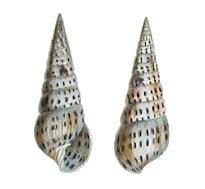

Scientific classification
- Kingdom: Animalia
- Phylum: Mollusca
- Class: Gastropoda
- Order: Heterostropha P. Fischer, 1885

= Heterostropha =

Order of gastropods

Heterostropha was a previously used taxonomic category, an order of sea snails, within the superorder Heterobranchia. In the most current gastropod taxonomy, that of Bouchet & Rocroi, this taxon is no longer in use.

The molluscs that were placed in this order have a heterostrophic protoconch. This is where the whorls at the very peak of the spire of the shell are coiled in an opposite direction to the adult whorls. The families in this order were sometimes previously classified as opisthobranchs.
