= Tubinidae =

Scientific classification
- Kingdom: Animalia
- Phylum: Mollusca
- Class: Gastropoda
- Superfamily: †Oriostomatoidea
- Family: †Tubinidae; Knight, 1956

Extinct family of gastropods

Tubinidae is an extinct family of fossil sea snails, marine, gastropod molluscs.

== Genera ==
Genera within the family Tubinidae include:

- Tubina, the type genus
- Colubrella
- Keration
- Meandrella
- Pseudotubina
- Semitubina
- Serpentubina
