= Yuopisthonematidae =

Scientific classification
- Kingdom: Animalia
- Phylum: Mollusca
- Class: Gastropoda
- Subclass: incertae sedis
- Family: †Yuopisthonematidae; Nützel, 2017

Synonyms
- Opisthonematidae Yu, 1976 (nom. inval.)

Extinct family of gastropods

Yuopisthonematidae is an extinct family of paleozoic gastropod molluscs.

This family is unassigned to superfamily. This family has no subfamilies.
