= Orthonychiidae =

Orthonychiidae Temporal range: Mid Ordovician–Devonian

Scientific classification
- Kingdom: Animalia
- Phylum: Mollusca
- Class: Gastropoda
- Order: incertae sedis
- Superfamily: †Platyceratoidea
- Family: †Orthonychiidae; Bandel & Frýda, 1999

Extinct family of gastropods

Orthonychiidae is an extinct family of fossil sea snails, marine, gastropod molluscs in the clade Cyrtoneritimorpha.

There is an unusually great degree of variability within the shells of species in the genus Orthonychia, but an analysis of this variability has not been done yet (2008).

== Genera ==
Genus Orthonychia Hall, 1843

- Orthonychia acuta Roemer, 1856
- Orthonychia baldwini Rohr et al., 1981
- Orthonychia belli Clarke, 1908
- Orthonychia bowsheri Yochelson, 1956
- Orthonychia chesterense Meek & Worthen, 1866
- Orthonychia concavum Hall, 1860
- Orthonychia conicum Hall, 1860
- Orthonychia conoidea (Goldfuss, 1844)
- Orthonychia cornuforme (Winchell, 1863)
- Orthonychia costata (Barrois, 1889)
- Orthonychia daschi (Rohr & Smith, 1978)
- Orthonychia dentalium Hall, 1862
- Orthonychia enorme (Lindström, 1884)
- Orthonychia infabricatus Hyde, 1953
- Orthonychia marblecreekensis Talent & Philip, 1956
- Orthonychia obliquesulata Spitz, 1907
- Orthonychia pajerensis Chronic, 1949
- Orthonychia parva (Shumard & Swallow, 1858)
- Orthonychia parvulum Whiteaves, 1892
- Orthonychia pentalvea Talent & Philip, 1956
- Orthonychia perplexum (Hall, 1879)
- Orthonychia prosseri Clarke & Swartz, 1913
- Orthonychia protei (Oehlert, 1883)
- Orthonychia puellaris (Whidborne, 1891)
- Orthonychia quadrangularis (Whidborne, 1891)
- Orthonychia rostratus (Trenkner, 1867)
- Orthonychia sciotoensis Hyde, 1953
- Orthonychia sileni (Oehlert, 1883)
- Orthonychia subrectum Hall, 1860 - type species
- Orthonychia steinbergensis Kegel, 1926
- Orthonychia talon Tolmachoff, 1930
- Orthonychia tortuosa (Hall, 1860)
- Orthonychia trirotundolobatum (Talent & Philip, 1956)
- Orthonychia unguiculata Clarke & Swartz, 1913
- Orthonychia variablis Tyler, 1965
- Orthonychia vishtytica Saladzius, 1966
- Orthonychia vomerium (Winchell, 1863)
- Orthonychia waverlyensis Hyde, 1953
- Orthonychia compressa / Platyceras (Orthonychia) compressum Girty 1910
- Orthonychia ungula / Platyceras (Orthonychia) ungula (Weller, 1906)
