= Planitrochidae =

Scientific classification
- Kingdom: Animalia
- Phylum: Mollusca
- Class: Gastropoda
- Subclass: Caenogastropoda
- Order: Littorinimorpha
- Superfamily: Xenophoroidea
- Family: †Planitrochidae; Knight, 1956

Extinct family of gastropods

Planitrochidae is an extinct family of fossil sea snails, Paleozoic gastropod mollusks.

This family has no subfamilies.

== Genera ==
Genera within the family Planotrochidae include:

- Horologium
- Nematrochus
- Perneritrochus
- Planotrochus, the type genus
- Trochomphalus
