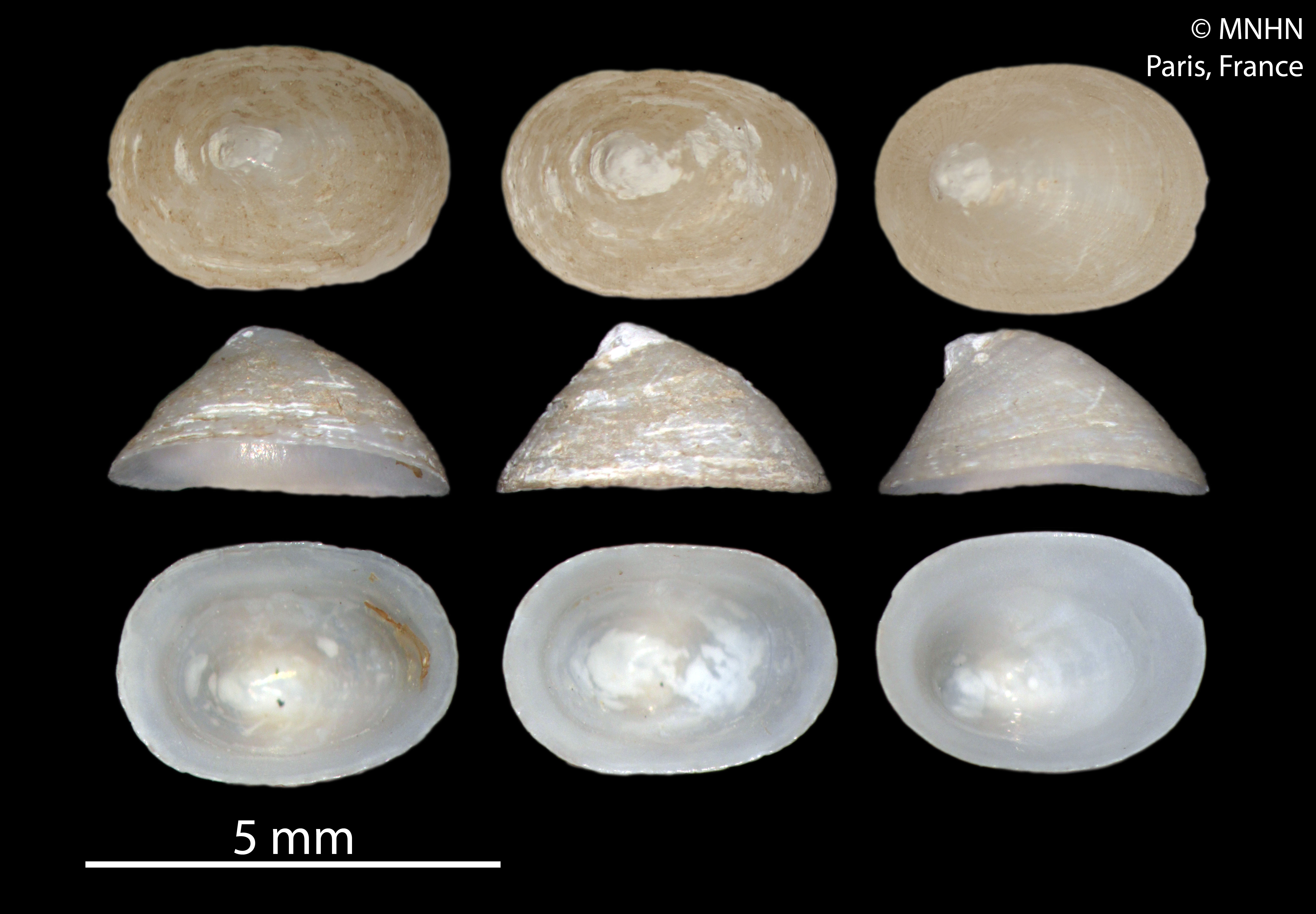
- Various examples of Coccopigya crinita (paratype at MNHN, Paris)

Scientific classification
- Kingdom: Animalia
- Phylum: Mollusca
- Class: Gastropoda
- Subclass: Vetigastropoda; Hazsprunar, 1987
- Superfamily: Cocculinoidea; Dall, 1882

Diversity
- 51 extant species, at least 4 fossil species

Synonyms
- Bathypeltoidea Moskalev, 1971 junior subjective synonym

= Cocculinoidea =

Superfamily of gastropods

The Cocculinoidea is a superfamily of deepwater limpets (marine gastropods), the only superfamily in the order Cocculinida, one of the main orders of gastropods according to the taxonomy as set up by Bouchet & Rocroi, 2005. The clade Cocculiniformia used to be designated as a superorder.

== Taxonomy ==
The Cocculinoidea (Cocculinacea Dall, 1882) are combined with the Lepetelliodea (Lepetellacea Dall, 1882) in Cocculinoformia Haszprunar, 1987, referred to as a clade in Bouchet & Rocroi, 2005 although it used to be designated a superorder by Ponder & Lindberg, 1997. Bouchet & Rocroi (2005) leave the Cocculiniformia to consist only of the Cocculinoidea, having moved the Lepetelloidea to the Vetigastropoda.

Note that before the stipulation by the ICZN, the majority of invertebrate superfamilies ended in -acea, or -aceae, not -oidea.

The superfamily Cocculinoidea contains the families:

- Bathysciadiidae Dautzenberg & H. Fischer, 1900
- Cocculinidae Dall, 1882
- Teuthirostriidae Haszprunar, Wendler, Jöst, Ruthensteiner & Heß, 2022

Synonyms

- Bathypeltidae Moskalev, 1971: synonym of Bathysciadiidae Dautzenberg & H. Fischer, 1900
