= Anozygidae =

Scientific classification
- Kingdom: Animalia
- Phylum: Mollusca
- Class: Gastropoda
- Subclass: Caenogastropoda
- Order: incertae sedis
- Superfamily: †Acteoninoidea
- Family: †Anozygidae; Bandel, 2002

Extinct family of gastropods

Anozygidae is an extinct family of fossil sea snails, marine gastropod mollusks in the clade Caenogastropoda.
