= Pragoscutulidae =

Scientific classification
- Kingdom: Animalia
- Phylum: Mollusca
- Class: Gastropoda
- Subclass: Caenogastropoda
- Order: incertae sedis
- Genus: †Pragoscutulidae; Frýda, 1998

Extinct family of gastropods

Pragoscutulidae is an extinct family of marine gastropod molluscs.
