= Straparollinidae =

Scientific classification
- Kingdom: Animalia
- Phylum: Mollusca
- Class: Gastropoda
- Superfamily: Straparollinoidea P. J. Wagner, 2002
- Family: Straparollinidae P. J. Wagner, 2002

Extinct family of gastropods

Straparollinidae is an extinct taxonomic family of fossil sea snails, marine gastropod molluscs.

Straparollinidae is the only family in the superfamily Straparollinoidea.

This family has no subfamilies.
