= Pragoserpulinidae =

Scientific classification
- Kingdom: Animalia
- Phylum: Mollusca
- Class: Gastropoda
- Subclass: incertae sedis
- Family: †Pragoserpulinidae; Frýda, 1998

Extinct family of gastropods

Pragoserpulinidae is an extinct family of Paleozoic gastropod molluscs.

This family is unassigned to superfamily. This family has no subfamilies.
