= Rhytidopilidae =

Scientific classification
- Kingdom: Animalia
- Phylum: Mollusca
- Class: Gastropoda
- Subclass: incertae sedis
- Family: †Rhytidopilidae; Starobogatov, 1976

Extinct family of gastropods

Rhytidopilidae is an extinct family of fossil sea snails, marine gastropod molluscs from the Paleozoic Era.

This family is unassigned to superfamily. This family has no subfamilies.
