= Sahlingia (gastropod) =

Scientific classification
- Kingdom: Animalia
- Phylum: Mollusca
- Class: Gastropoda
- Subclass: Vetigastropoda
- Genus: Sahlingia; Warén & Bouchet, 2001

Genus of gastropods

Sahlingia is a genus of sea snails, marine gastropod mollusks in the clade Vetigastropoda.

== Species ==
Species within the genus Sahlingia include:

- Sahlingia xandaros Warén & Bouchet, 2001
