= Oriostomatoidea =

Scientific classification
- Kingdom: Animalia
- Phylum: Mollusca
- Class: Gastropoda
- Subclass: incertae sedis
- Superfamily: †Oriostomatoidea; Koken, 1896

Families
- See text

Extinct superfamily of gastropods

Oriostomatoidea is an extinct superfamily of fossil sea snails, marine gastropod molluscs.

== Taxonomy ==
Families within the superfamily Oriostomatoidea are as follows:

- † Family Oriostomatidae
- † Family Tubinidae
