= Codonocheilidae =

Scientific classification
- Kingdom: Animalia
- Phylum: Mollusca
- Class: Gastropoda
- Subclass: incertae sedis
- Family: †Codonocheilidae; S. A. Miller, 1889

Extinct family of gastropods

Codonocheilidae is an extinct family of Paleozoic fossil gastropod molluscs.

This family is unassigned to superfamily. This family has no subfamilies.
