= Clisospiroidea =

Scientific classification
- Kingdom: Animalia
- Phylum: Mollusca
- Class: Gastropoda
- Superfamily: †Clisospiroidea; S. A. Miller, 1889

Synonyms
- Mimospirina

Extinct superfamily of gastropods

Clisospiroidea is an extinct taxonomic superfamily of fossil sea snails, marine gastropod molluscs.

Families:

- † Clisospiridae
- † Onychochilidae
