= Pelagiellida =

Scientific classification
- Domain: Eukaryota
- Kingdom: Animalia
- Phylum: Mollusca
- Class: Monoplacophora
- Order: †Pelagiellida

Extinct order of molluscs

The Pelagiellida are a group of Cambrian molluscs superficially assigned to the (polyphyletic) Monoplacophora, although their true taxonomic affinities within the Mollusca are unknown.
