= Vltaviellidae =

Scientific classification
- Kingdom: Animalia
- Phylum: Mollusca
- Class: Gastropoda
- Clade: †Cyrtoneritimorpha
- Family: †Vltaviellidae; Bandel & Frýda 1999

Extinct family of gastropods

Vltaviellidae is an extinct family of fossil sea snails, marine, gastropod molluscs in the clade Cyrtoneritimorpha. There are two subfamilies, the Vltaviellinae and the Krameriellinae.

== Genera ==
Genera within the family Vltaviellidae include:

- Vltaviellinae

Vltaviella
Eifelcyrtus

- Krameriellinae

Krameriella
Soetenichia
