= Spirostylidae =

Scientific classification
- Kingdom: Animalia
- Phylum: Mollusca
- Class: Gastropoda
- Subclass: Caenogastropoda
- Order: incertae sedis
- Family: †Spirostylidae; Cossmann, 1909

Extinct family of gastropods

Spirostylidae is an extinct family of fossil sea snails, marine gastropod molluscs in the clade Caenogastropoda.
