= Plicatusidae =

Scientific classification
- Kingdom: Animalia
- Phylum: Mollusca
- Class: Gastropoda
- Subclass: Caenogastropoda
- Order: incertae sedis
- Family: †Plicatusidae; Pan & Erwin, 2002

Extinct family of gastropods

Plicatusidae is an extinct family of fossil sea snails, marine gastropod molluscs in the clade Caenogastropoda.
