= Chuchlinidae =

Scientific classification
- Kingdom: Animalia
- Phylum: Mollusca
- Class: Gastropoda
- Order: Coenogastropoda
- Family: †Chuchlinidae; Frýda & Bandel, 1997

Extinct family of gastropods

Chuchlinidae is an extinct family of fossil sea snails, marine gastropod mollusks in the clade Caenogastropoda.
