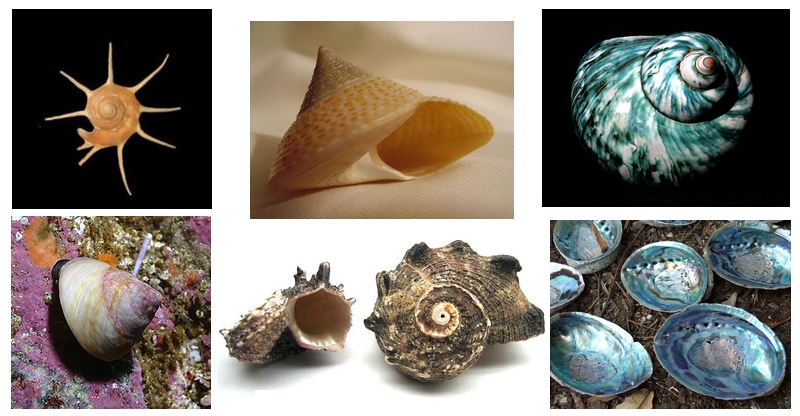
- Various shells of Vetigastropoda

Scientific classification
- Kingdom: Animalia
- Phylum: Mollusca
- Class: Gastropoda
- Subclass: Vetigastropoda; Salvini-Plawen, 1989

Superfamilies
- See text

Diversity
- 3,700 extant species

Synonyms
- Archaeogastropoda (unaccepted as paraphyletic taxon); Neomphaliones

= Vetigastropoda =

Vetigastropoda Temporal range: Ludlow–Recent

Clade of sea snails

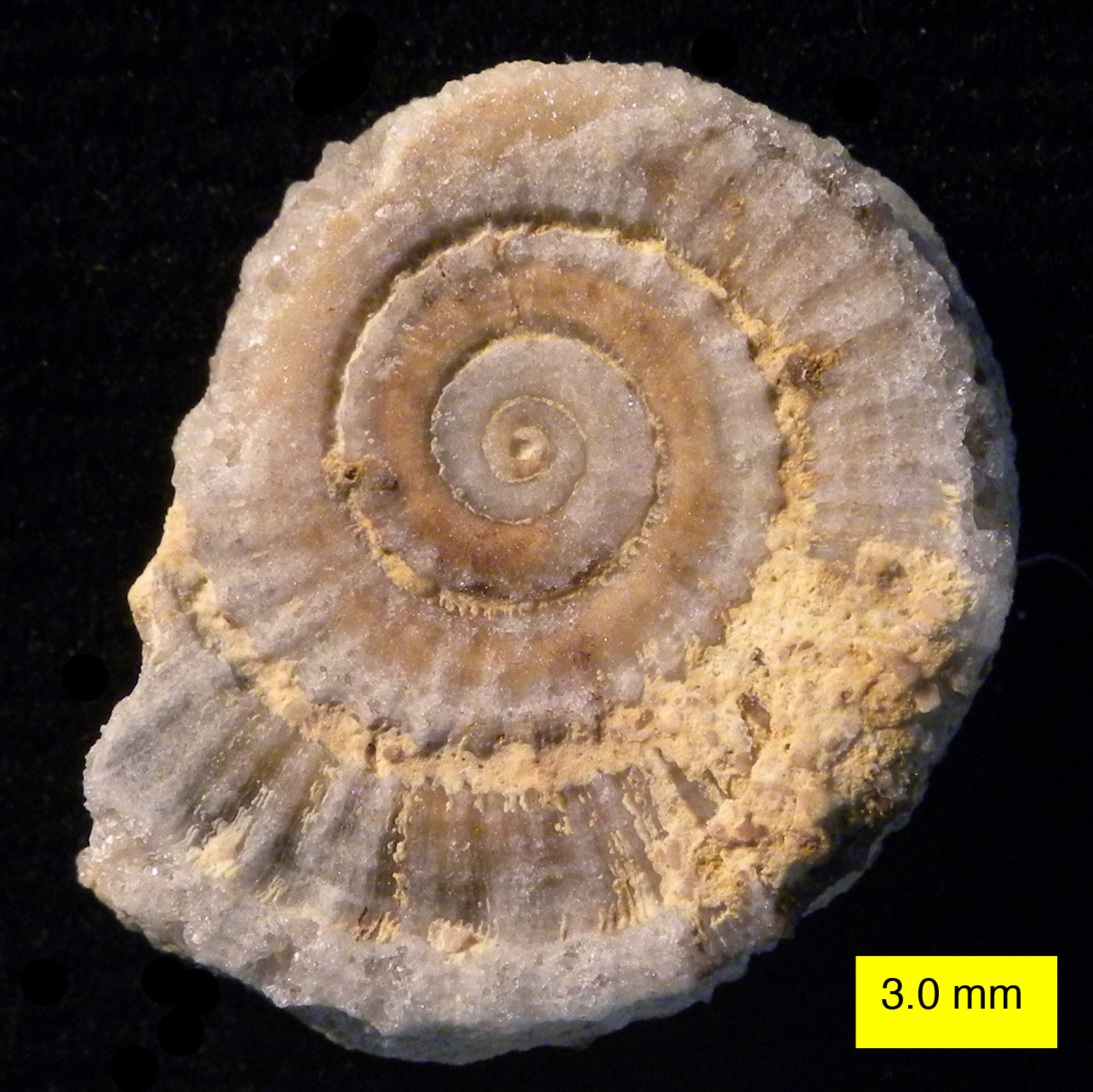
The fossil vetigastropod Discohelix tunisiensis from the Matmor Formation (Middle Jurassic) of southern Israel.

Vetigastropoda is a major taxonomic group of sea snails, marine gastropod mollusks that form a very ancient lineage. Taxonomically the Vetigastropoda are sometimes treated as an order, although they are treated as an unranked clade in Bouchet and Rocroi, 2005.

Vetigastropods are considered to be among the most primitive living gastropods, and are widely distributed in all oceans of the world. Their habitats range from the deep sea to intertidal zones. Many have shells with slits or other secondary openings. One of their main characteristics is the presence of intersected crossed platy shell structure. Most vetigastropods have some bilateral asymmetry of their organ systems.

== Description ==
Vetigastropods range in size from approximately 0.08 in (2 mm) long in the case of Scissurelloidea or Skeneoidea, to more than 11.8 in (300 mm) in length, as with the Haliotoidea. External colours and patterns are typically drab, but such groups as the Tricolioidea and some Trochoidea and Pleurotomarioidea have bright colours and glossy shells. The clade is characterized by having an intersected crossed platy shell structure.

Shells range from elongate turret-shaped structures, to near-spherical. Shell sculpture varies greatly from simple concentric growth lines, which may or may not be barely visible on the shell surface, to heavy radial and axial ribbing. The shell aperture is normally oval, and often tangential to the coiling axis. Most species have an operculum (a small lid-like organ). Within the shell, Vetigastropods have a single pair of cephalic tentacles, and a distinct snout containing the mouth. The lateral sides of the body typically have sensory epipodial tentacles.

== Distribution ==
Vetigastropods are found throughout all oceans of the world from shallow coastal waters to deep-sea environments, including tropical areas, temperate regions, and under polar ice.

== Habitat ==
Vetigastropods are present in most marine environments from intertidal zones to the deep sea. Many vetigastropods have adapted to specific ecological niches within their marine environments. They exist on rocky substrates, in soft sediments, and some have been found at deep-sea hydrothermal vents and cold seeps.

== Behaviour ==
Most vetigastropods are dioecious, although some deep-sea varieties are hermaphrodites. Vetigastropods usually eject their gametes directly into the sea for fertilization, thus there is no courtship or mating between individuals for most species.

== Diet ==
Vetigastropods typically feed on such organisms as bryozoans, tunicates, and sponges. Several species such as Haliotoidea and Trochoidea have evolved to feed directly on such plant material as algae and marine angiosperms. Deep-sea vetigastropods typically consume sediment.

== Reproduction ==
Vetigastropods typically have separate sexes, with individuals being either male or female. Fertilization usually occurs externally, and they lay eggs that develop into free-swimming larvae before settling as young adults. They normally have very small eggs that produce lecithotrophic (yolk feeding) or non-feeding larvae. Many vetigastropods secrete egg envelopes and have glandular pallial structures that produce masses of jelly-coated eggs.

Larger species typically have yearly cycles of spawning, and produce millions of eggs per reproductive season. Smaller species produce fewer eggs, but can spawn year round.

== Taxonomy ==
The Vetigastropoda have been referred to as a superorder as recently as at least 2007, by M. Harzhauser and in 2005 by D. Heidelberger and L. Koch following Ponder & Lindberg, 1997, although Bouchet & Rocroi, 2005 refer to this group simply as a clade, leaving taxonomic determination as a future option. The World Register of Marine Species (WoRMS) follows Bouchet & Rocroi regarding the taxonomic content of the Gastropoda but gives ranks to the higher taxa and defines Vetigastropoda as a subclass.

Bouchet & Rocroi, 2005 treats the Vetigastropoda as a major clade and as a sister clade to the Caenogastropoda but includes the Vetigastropoda in what are referred to as Basal taxa that are certainly Gastropoda. Ponder & Lindberg, 1997 previously assigned the Vetigastropoda, as a superorder, to the Subclass Orthogastropoda. Phylogenetic analysis indicates that this taxon is one of the four natural groups within the Gastropoda: Vetigastropoda, Caenogastropoda, Patellogastropoda, and Heterobranchia. Research on the mitochondrial genome arrangement has shown that the Vetigastropoda (and Caenogastropoda) mostly retain the ancestral gene arrangement.

In 2022 a new study showed, regardless of whether Vetigastropoda is monophyletic or not, its close affinity to Neomphaliones with high statistical support, thus favoring the concept of Vetigastropoda including Neomphalida and Cocculinida.

=== Superfamilies ===
Superfamilies within the Vetigastropoda include:

- Not assigned to a superfamily within Vetigastropoda are:
  - the families: Ataphridae Cossmann, 1915, Pendromidae Warén, 1991 (synonym: Trachysmatidae Thiele, 1925), † Schizogoniidae
  - the genera: Sahlingia Warén & Bouchet, 2001
- Superfamily †Amberleyoidea
- Superfamily Angarioidea (created as a new superfamily by Williams et al. (2008).)
- Superfamily Cocculinoidea
- Superfamily †Eotomarioidea
- Superfamily Fissurelloidea Flemming, 1822 - keyhole limpets
- Superfamily Haliotoidea Rafinesque, 1815 - abalones
- Superfamily Lepetelloidea
- Superfamily Lepetodriloidea McLean, 1988 - hydrothermal vent limpets
- Superfamily †Murchisonioidea
- Superfamily Neomphaloidea : belongs in its own independent clade, the Neomphalina, outside the Vetigastropoda
- Superfamily Pleurotomarioidea Swainson, 1840 - slit snails: a sister clade to Neomphalina
- Superfamily †Porcellioidea
- Superfamily Scissurelloidea
- Superfamily Seguenzioidea Verrill, 1884
- Superfamily Trochoidea Rafinesque, 1815 - top snails
- Superfamily Turbinoidea - turban snails - In 2008 this superfamily has been split into Trochoidea and Phasianelloidea
