= Hyperacanthus =

Hyperacanthus may refer to:

- Hyperacanthus (gastropod), a genus in the family Cirridae
- Hyperacanthus (plant), a genus in the family Rubiaceae
