= Sclerobiont =

Sclerobionts are collectively known as organisms living in or on any kind of hard substrate (Taylor and Wilson, 2003). A few examples of sclerobionts include Entobia borings, Gastrochaenolites borings, Talpina borings, serpulids, encrusting oysters, encrusting foraminiferans, Stomatopora bryozoans, and "Berenicea" bryozoans.

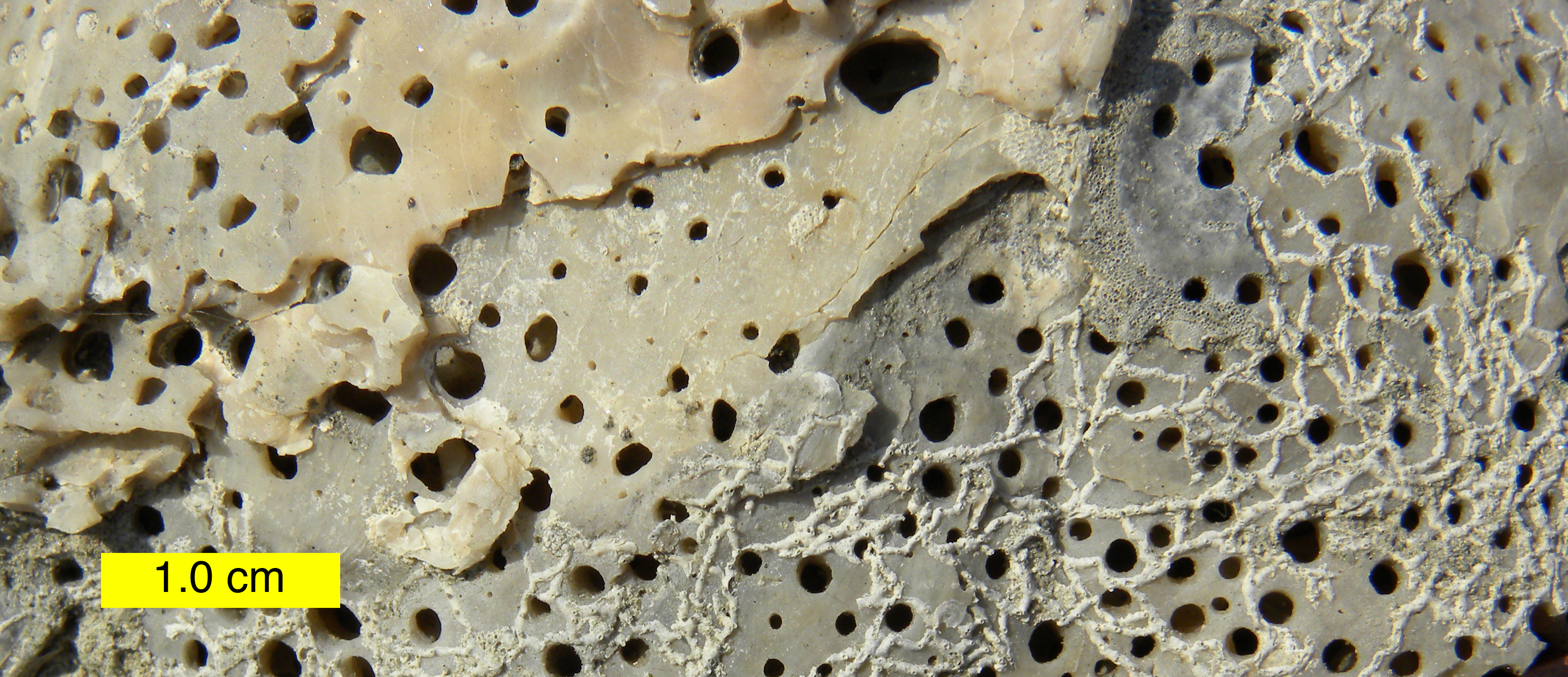
Entobia sponge borings and the cyclostome bryozoan Voigtopora thurni on an oyster valve from the Coon Creek Beds of the Ripley Formation (Upper Cretaceous) near Blue Springs, Mississippi.

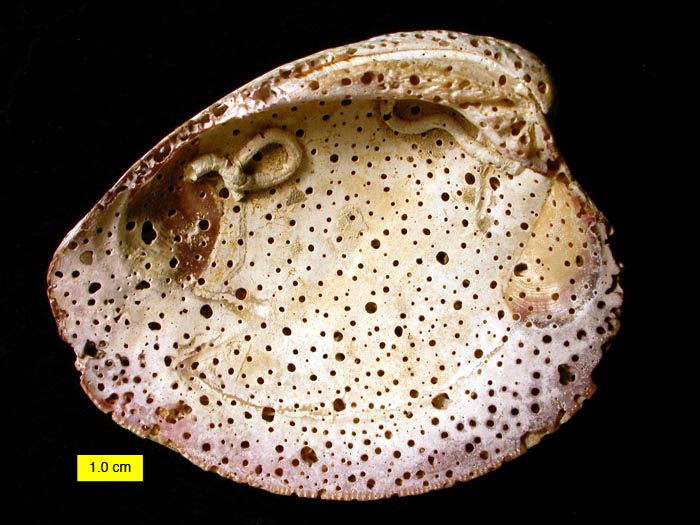
Another example of Entobia sponge borings and encrusting serpulid worms on a modern shell of the bivalve Mercenaria in North Carolina.

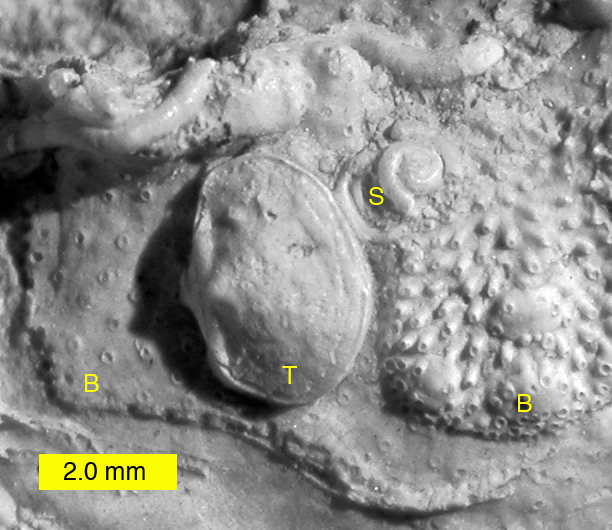
Thecideide brachiopod (T), sabellid worm tube (S) and bryozoans (B) on the shell of the bivalve Ctenostreon from the Upper Jurassic of Poland.

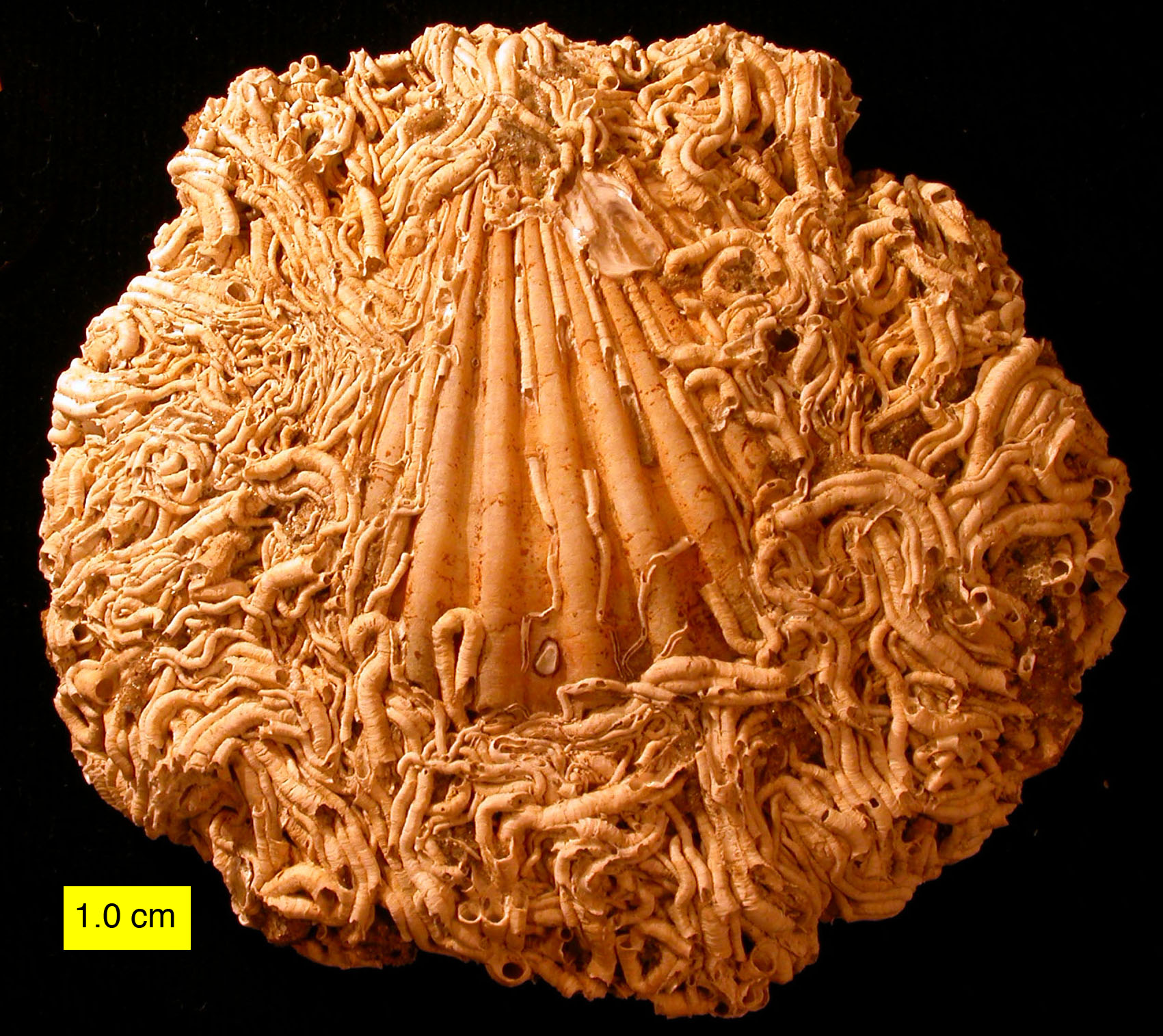
Serpulid worms enrusting Pecten; Duck Harbor Beach on Cape Cod Bay, Wellfleet, Massachusetts.

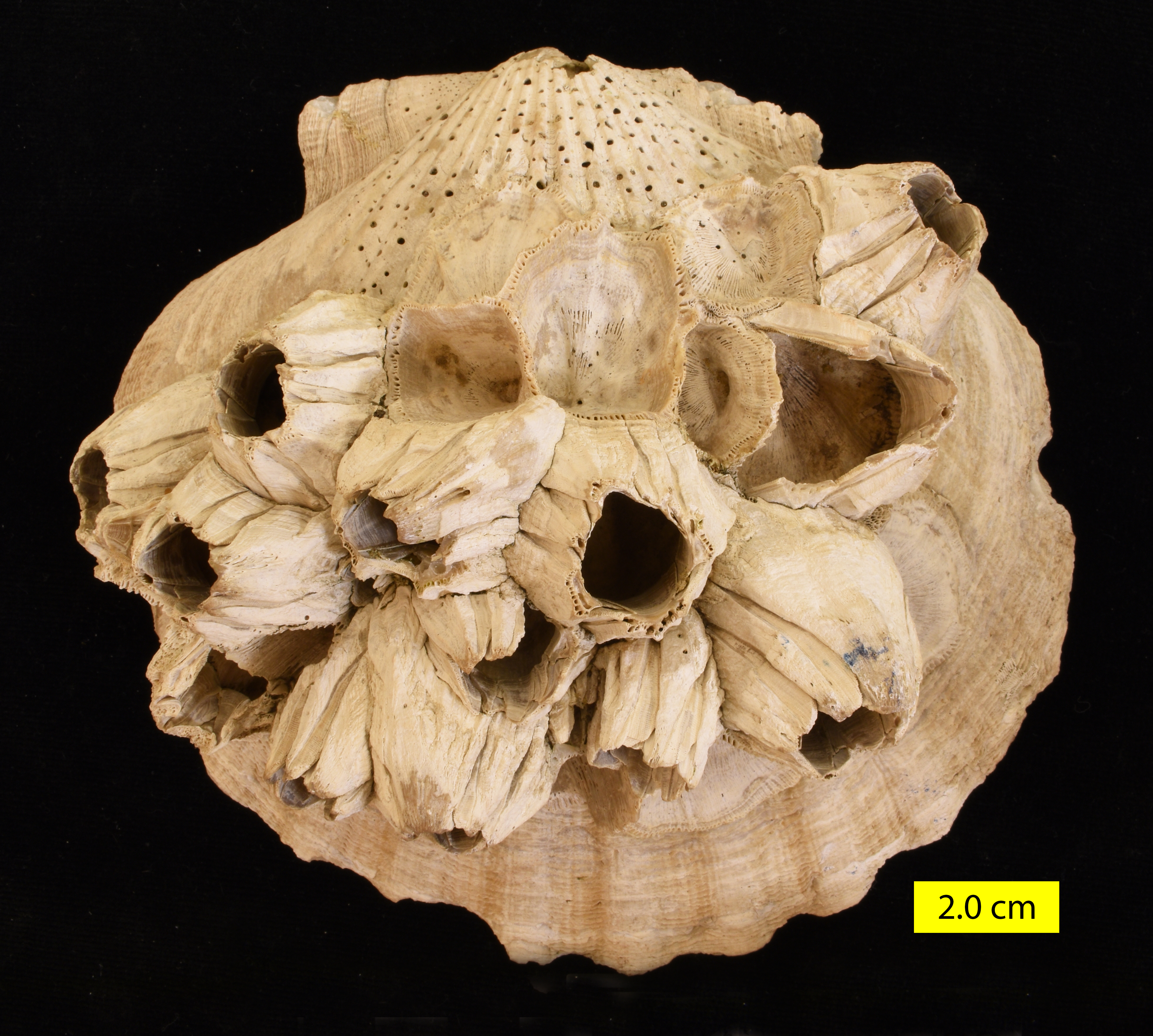
Chesapecten, barnacles and sponge borings (Entobia) from the Pliocene of York River, Virginia, USA.

== See also ==
Bioerosion
