= Matmor Formation =

Geologic formation in Israel

- Stratigraphic range: Late Callovian; ~164–160 Ma
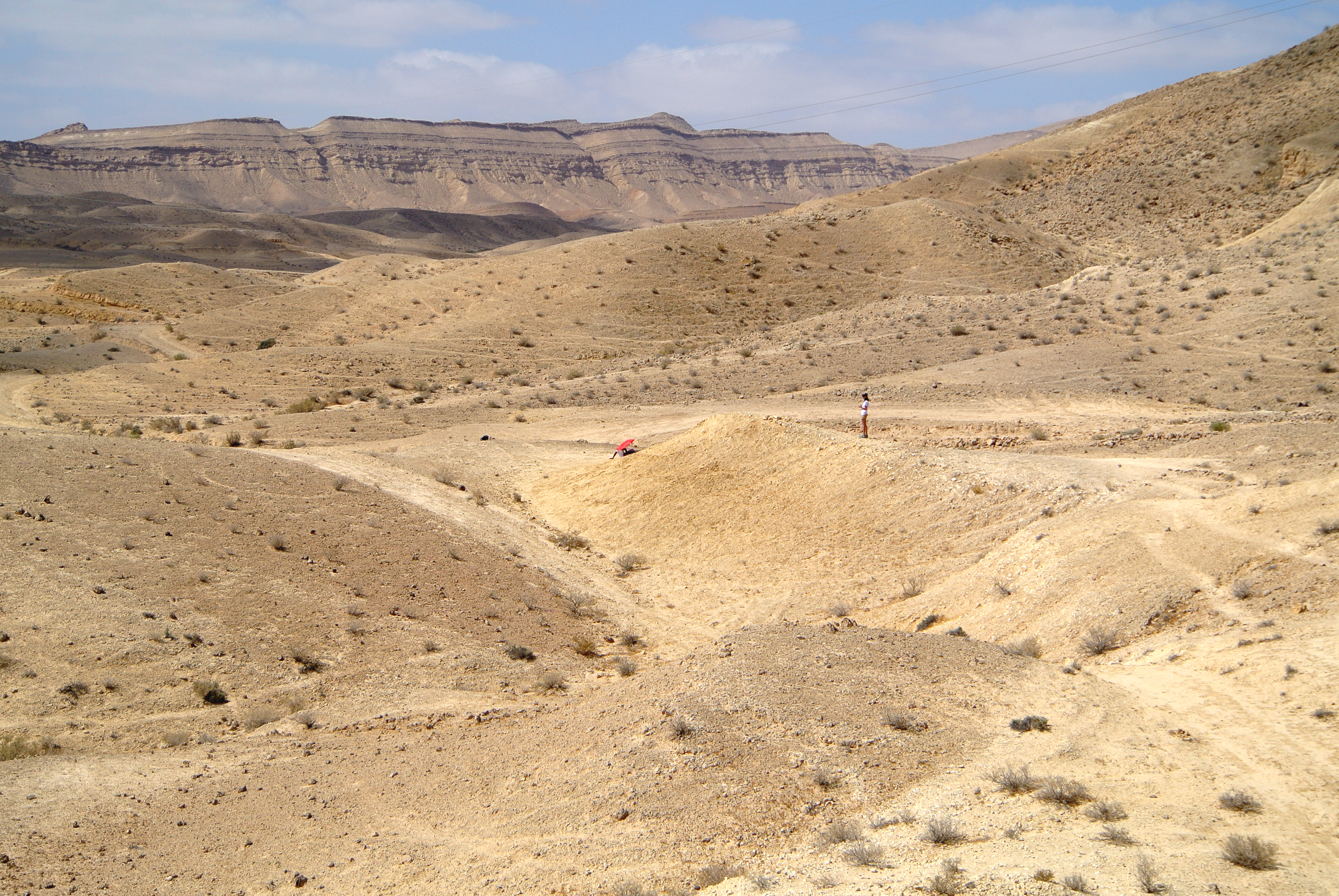
- Matmor Formation (foreground and middle ground) in Hamakhtesh Hagadol, Israel
- Type: Sedimentary
- Underlies: Hatira Formation
- Overlies: Kidod Formation
- Thickness: Up to 100 m (330 ft)

Lithology
- Primary: Limestone
- Other: Marl

Location
- Region: Negev
- Country: Israel
- Extent: Southern Israel

Type section
- Named for: Matmor, Israel
- Named by: Hirsch & Roded
- Year defined: 1996

The Matmor Formation is a geologic formation of up to 100 metres (330 ft) thick, that is exposed in Hamakhtesh Hagadol in southern Israel. The Matmor Formation contains fossils from a Jurassic equatorial shallow marine environment. Bivalves, gastropods, sponges, corals, echinoderms, and sclerobionts are present in the Matmor Formation to various degrees (Wilson et al., 2010). The stratigraphy of the Matmor Formation consists of alternating layers of limestone and marl (Hirsch and Roded, 1996).

== Stratigraphy ==
The Iraq Petroleum Company originally described the Jurassic sequence in Hamakhtesh Hagadol of Israel in the 1930s (Hudson, 1958). These findings were later described and published by Blake (1935). Shaw (1947) published a limited summary of the stratigraphy. Hudson (1958) later subdivided the rocks into the Callovian, Divesian, Argovian, Sequanim biostratigraphic stages. In 1963, Goldberg subdivided the section into the Zohar, Kidod and Be'er Sheva Formations. Goldberg (1963) further divided the Zohar Formation into the Ziyya and Madsus members. In 1966, Mayac dated the Callovian and what appeared to be the Lower Oxfordian stages with forams (Mayac, 1966, in Hirsch and Roded, 1996). Further biostratigraphic work by Hirsch et al. (1998) and Grossowicz et al. (2000) show that the Matmor Formation is entirely Late Callovian.

== Gallery ==
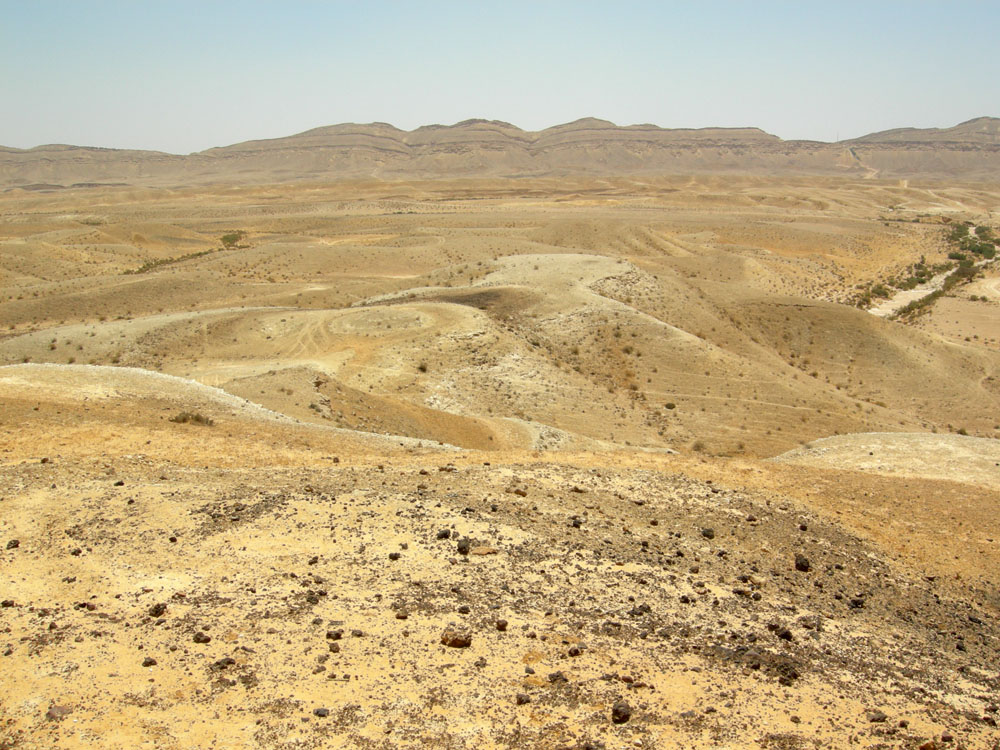
Marls and limestones of the Matmor Formation exposed near the center of Makhtesh Gadol

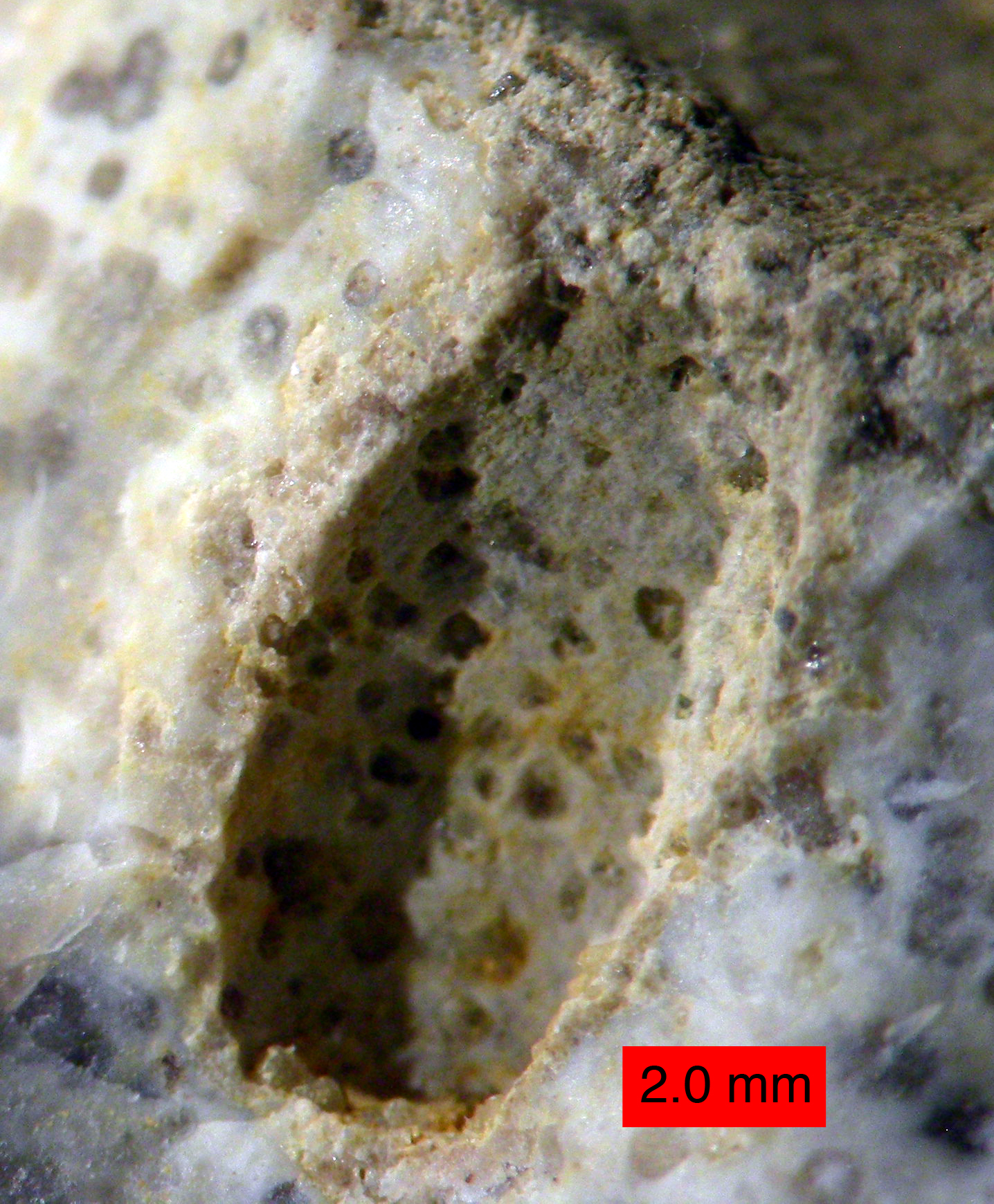
Gastrochaenolites boring in a coral from the Matmor Formation

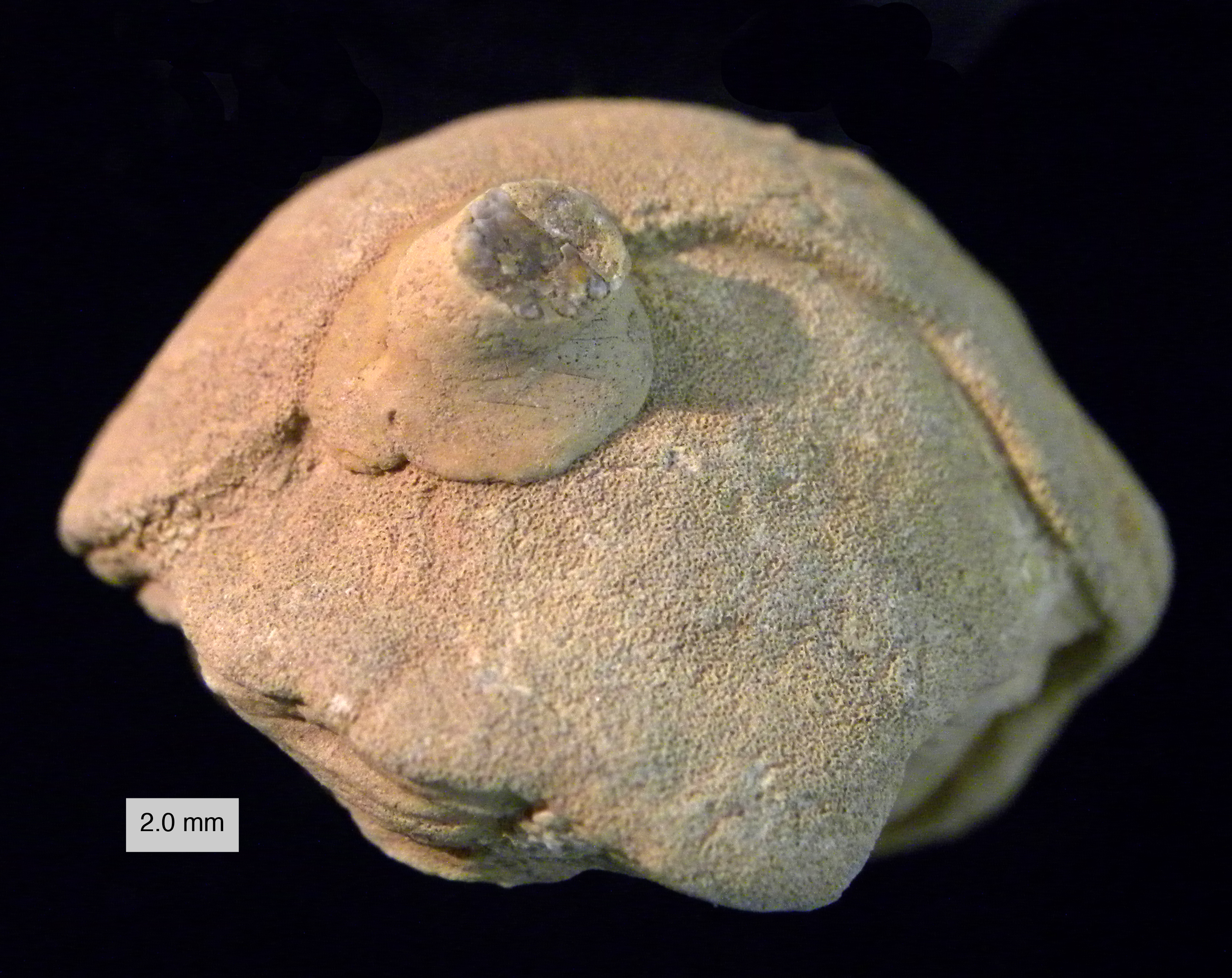
Calcarea sponge and encrusting crinoid from the Matmor Formation

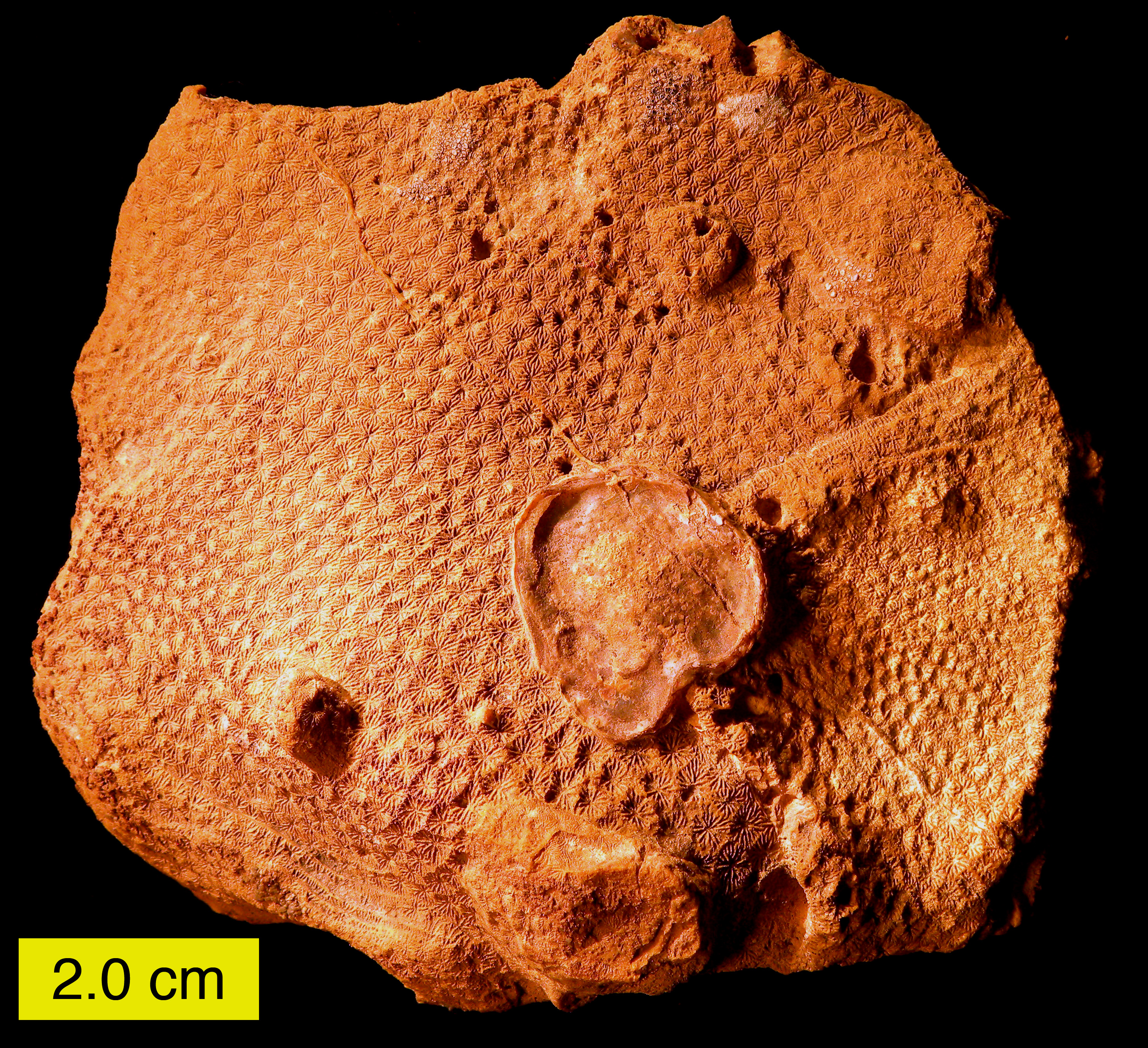
Scleractinian coral from the Matmor Formation

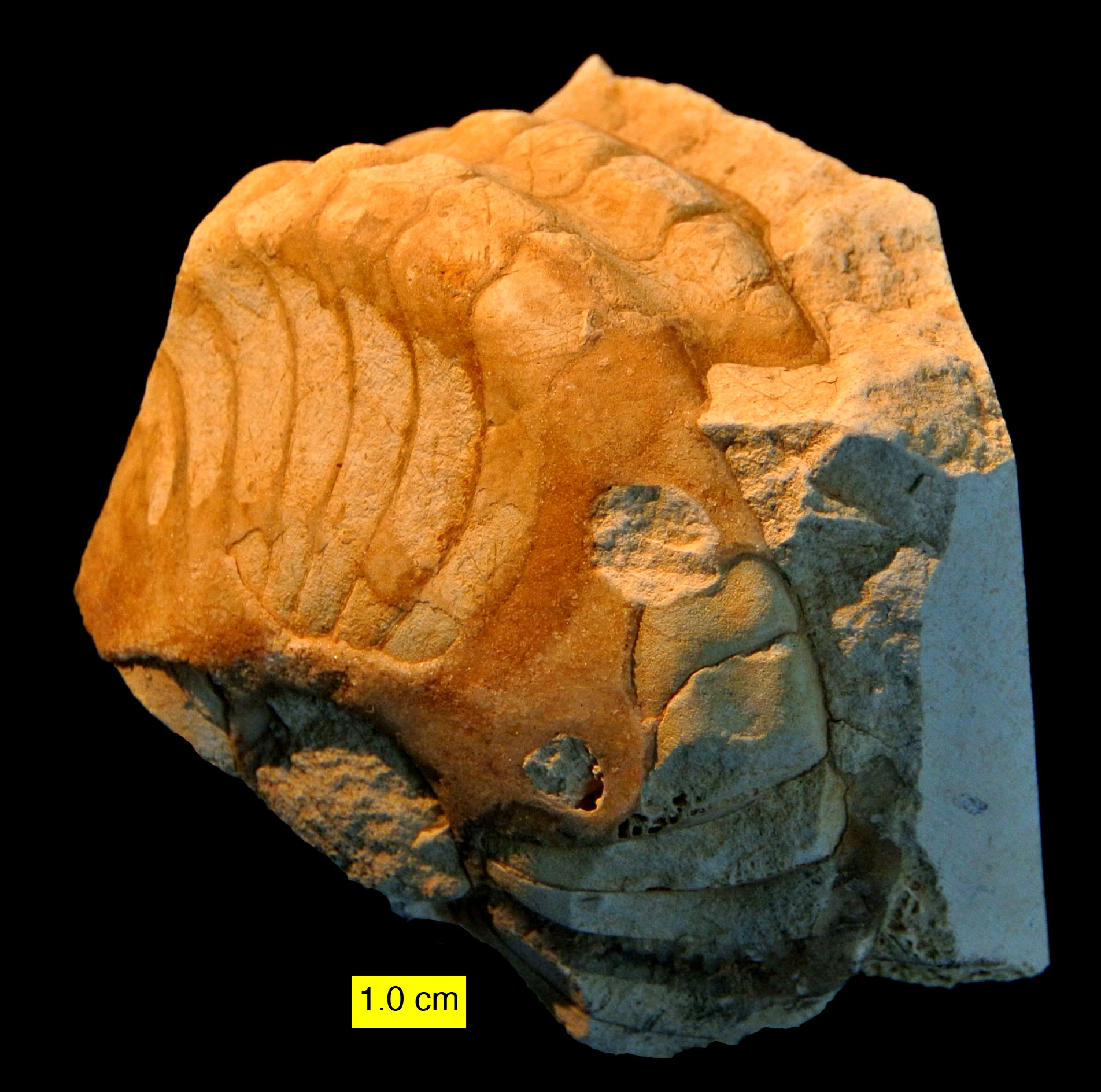
Paracenoceras, a nautiloid from the Matmor Formation

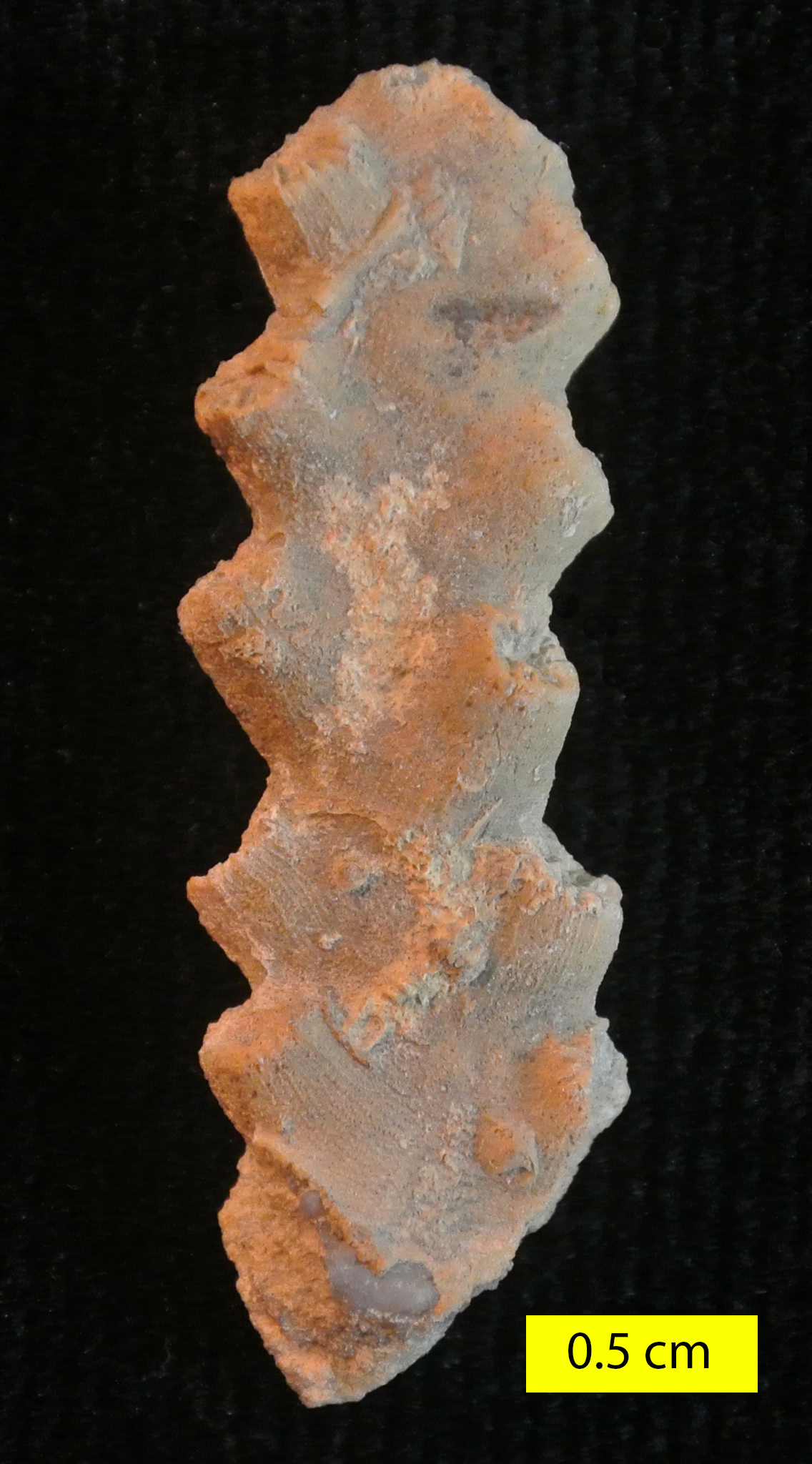
Enallhelia, a scleractinian coral from the Matmor Formation

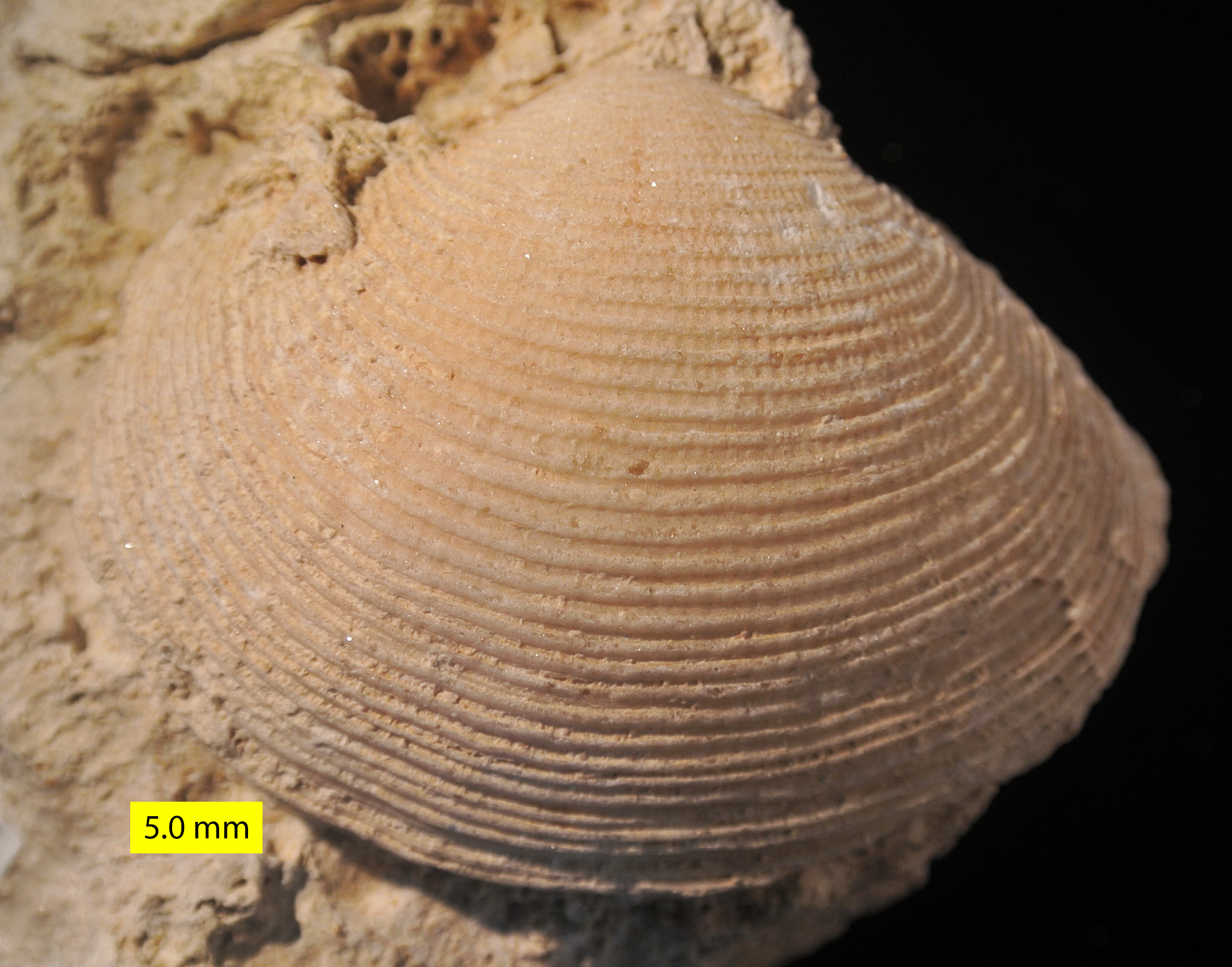
Fimbria sp.; a bivalve from the Matmor Formation

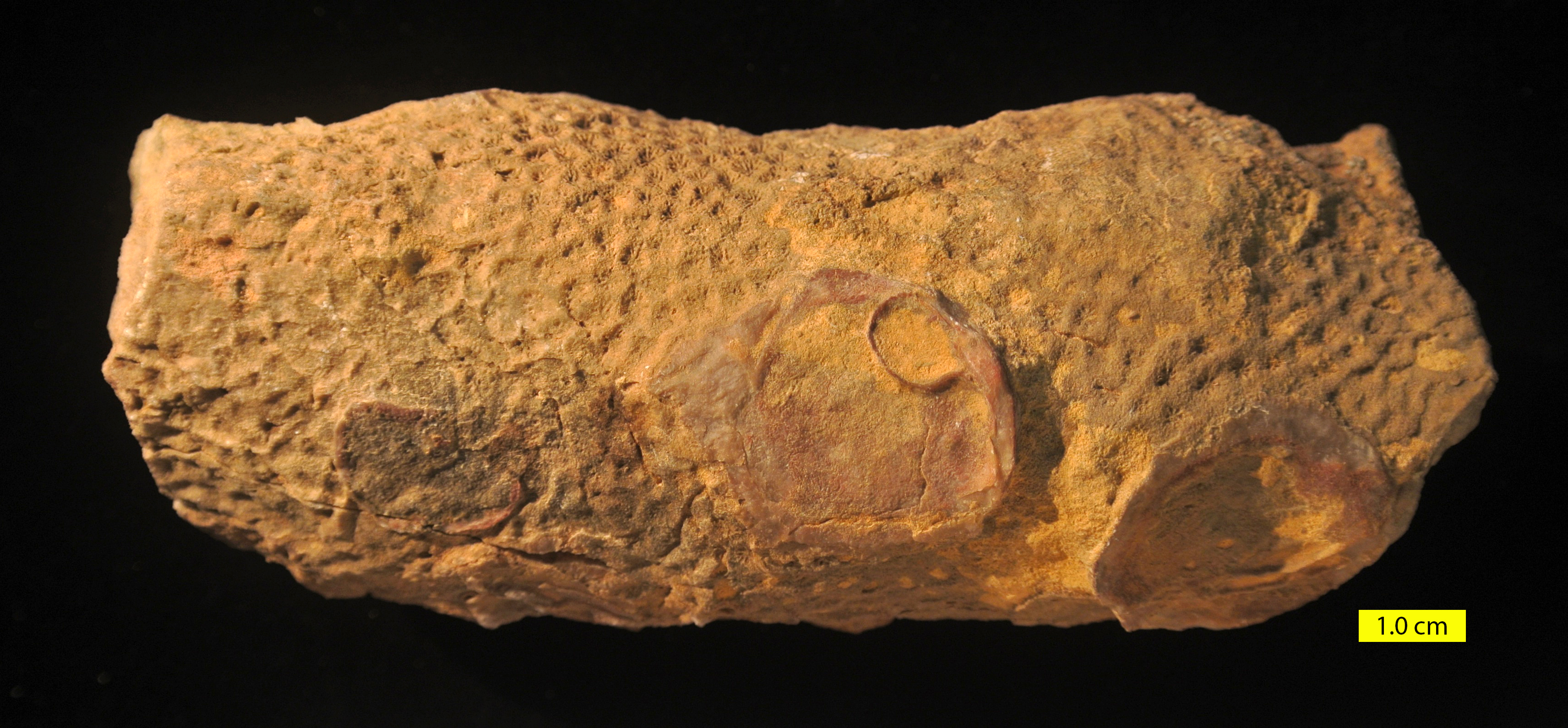
Amphiastrea Etallon 1859; a scleractinian coral from the Matmor Formation

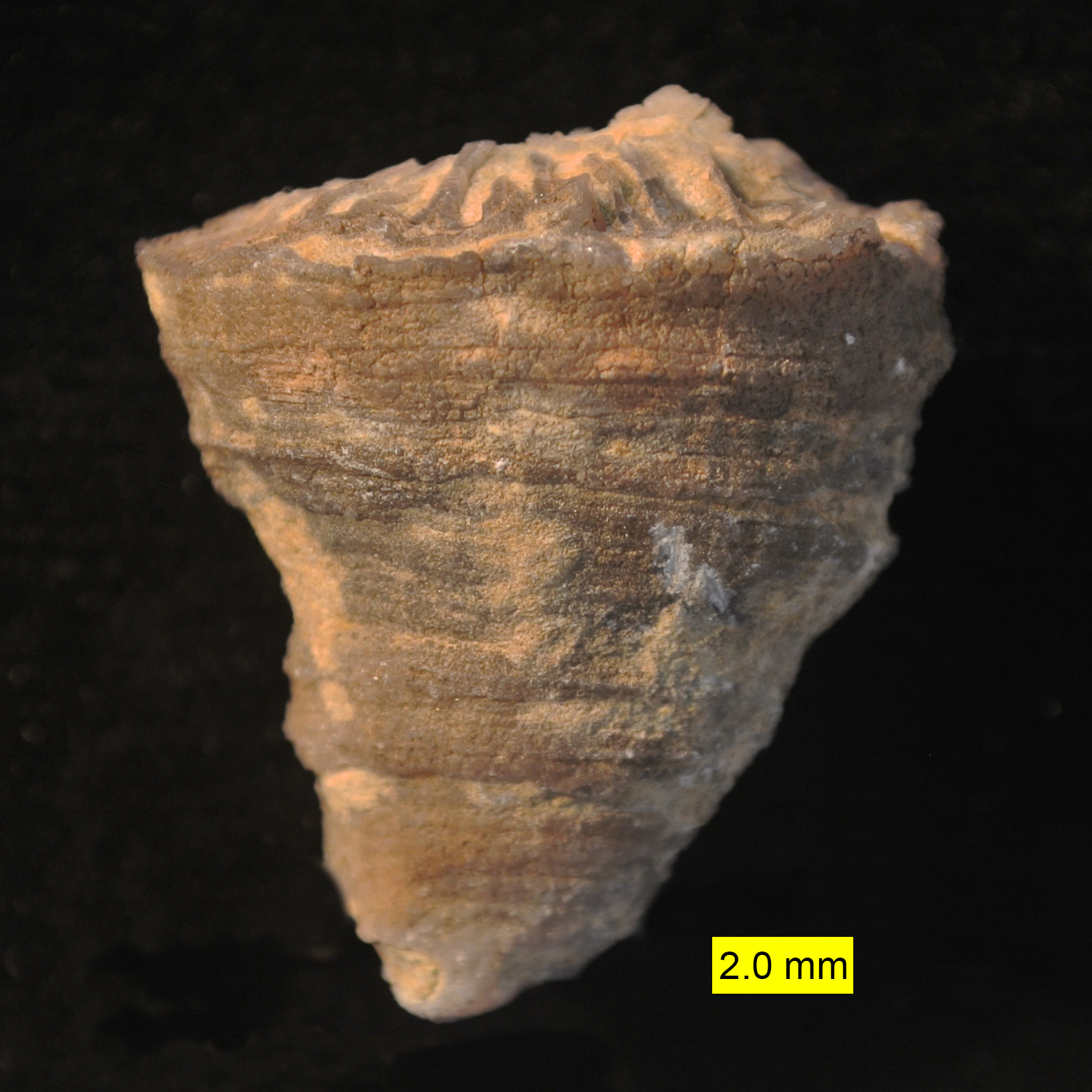
Axosmilia, a scleractinian coral from the Matmor Formation (Middle Jurassic) of southern Israel; side view

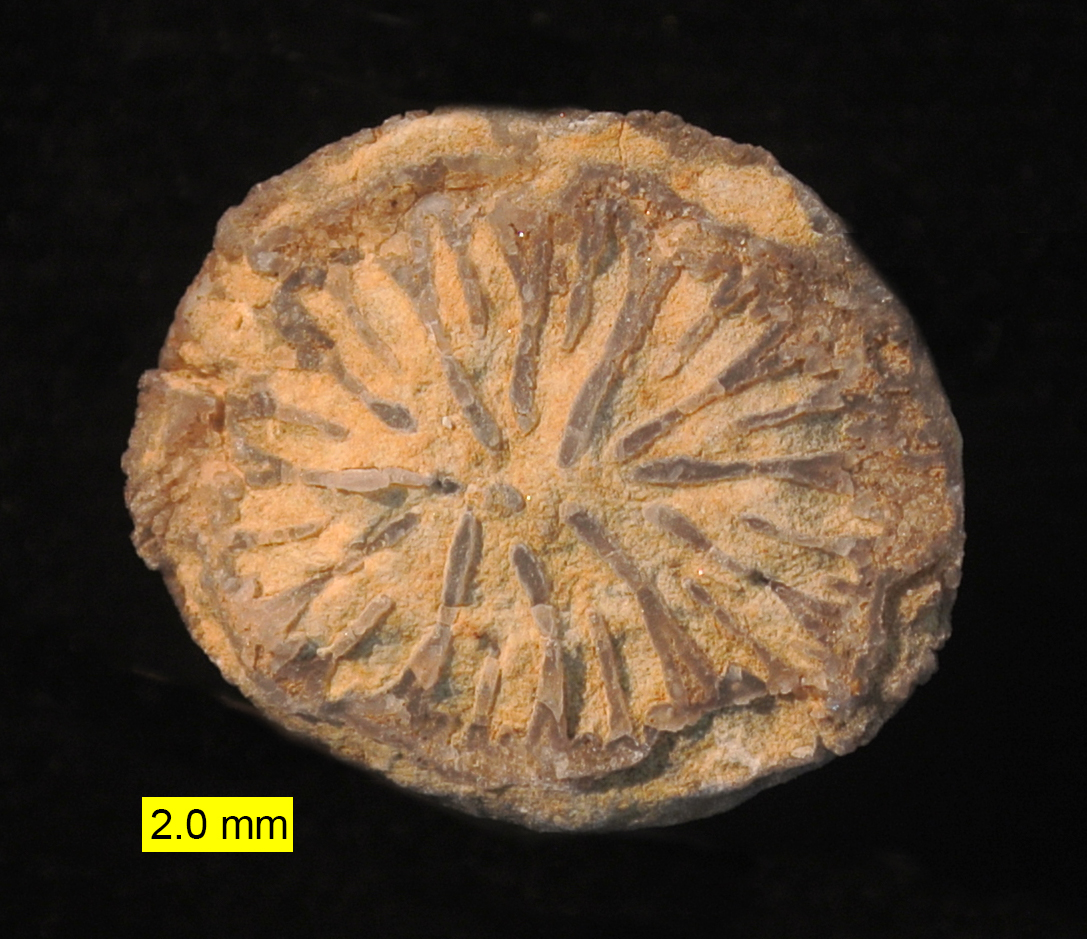
Axosmilia, a scleractinian coral from the Matmor Formation (Middle Jurassic) of southern Israel; oral view

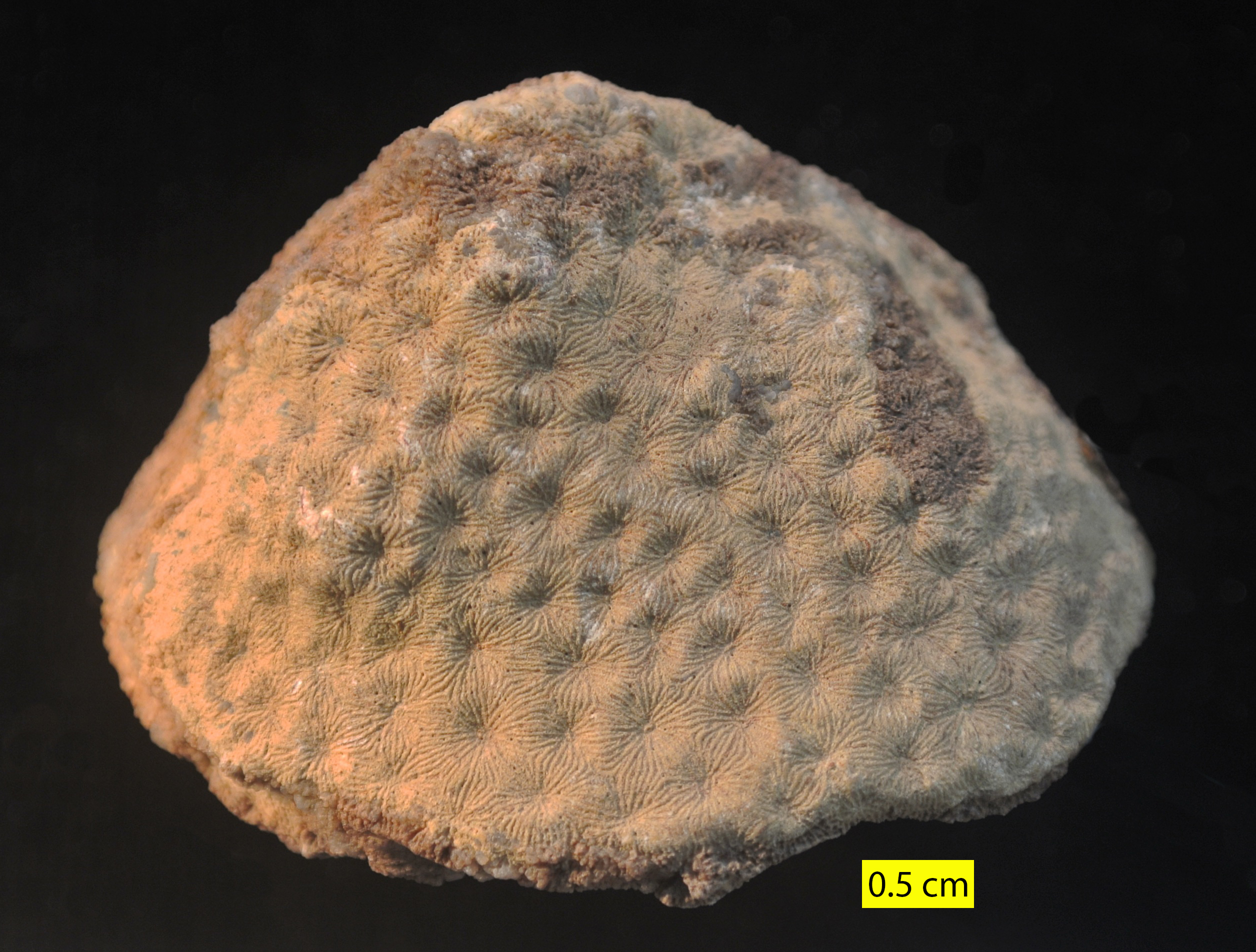
The scleractinian coral Microsolena from the Matmor Formation, Middle Jurassic, southern Israel

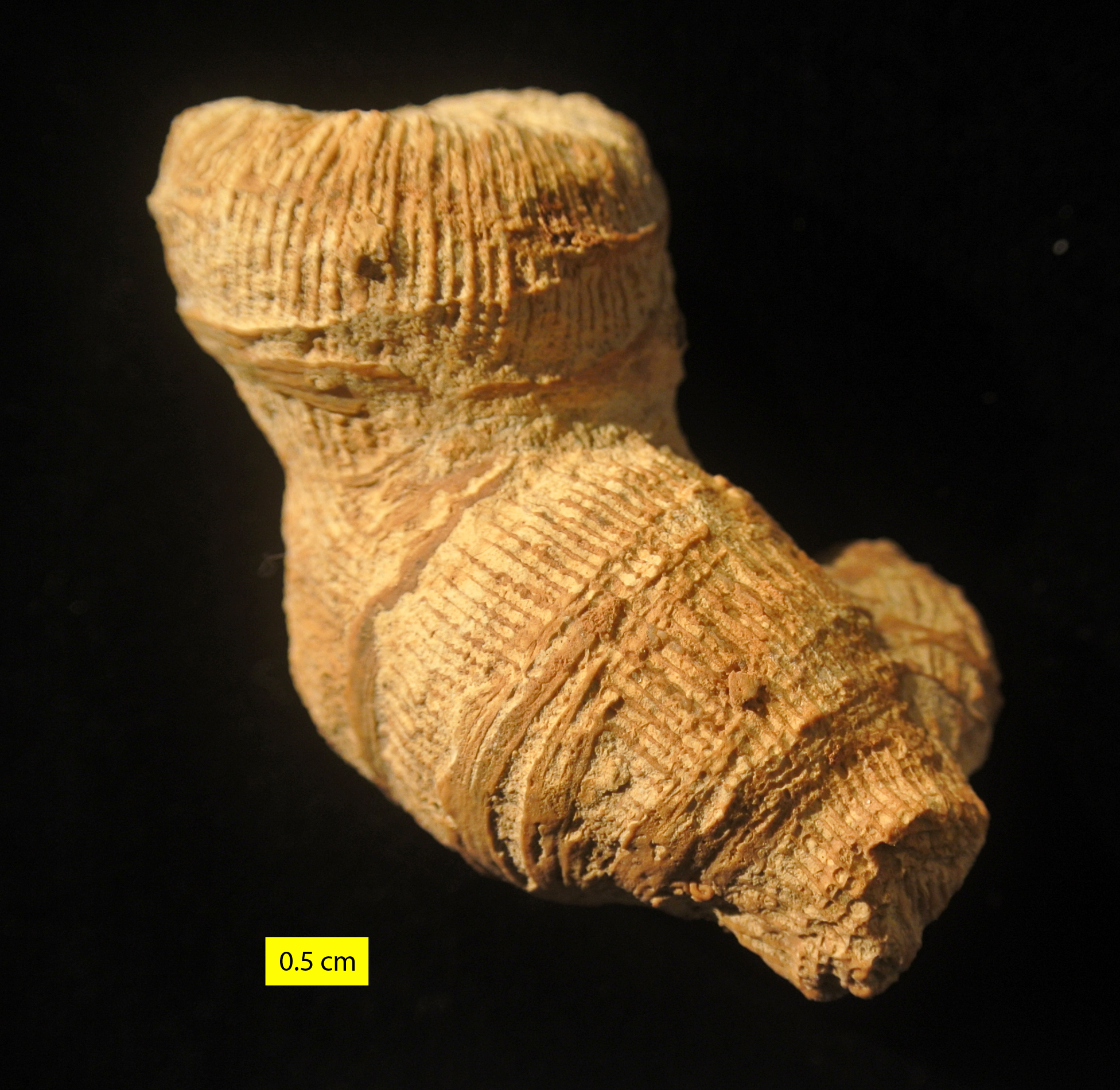
Epistreptophyllum, a scleractinian coral from the Matmor Formation (Middle Jurassic) of southern Israel; side view

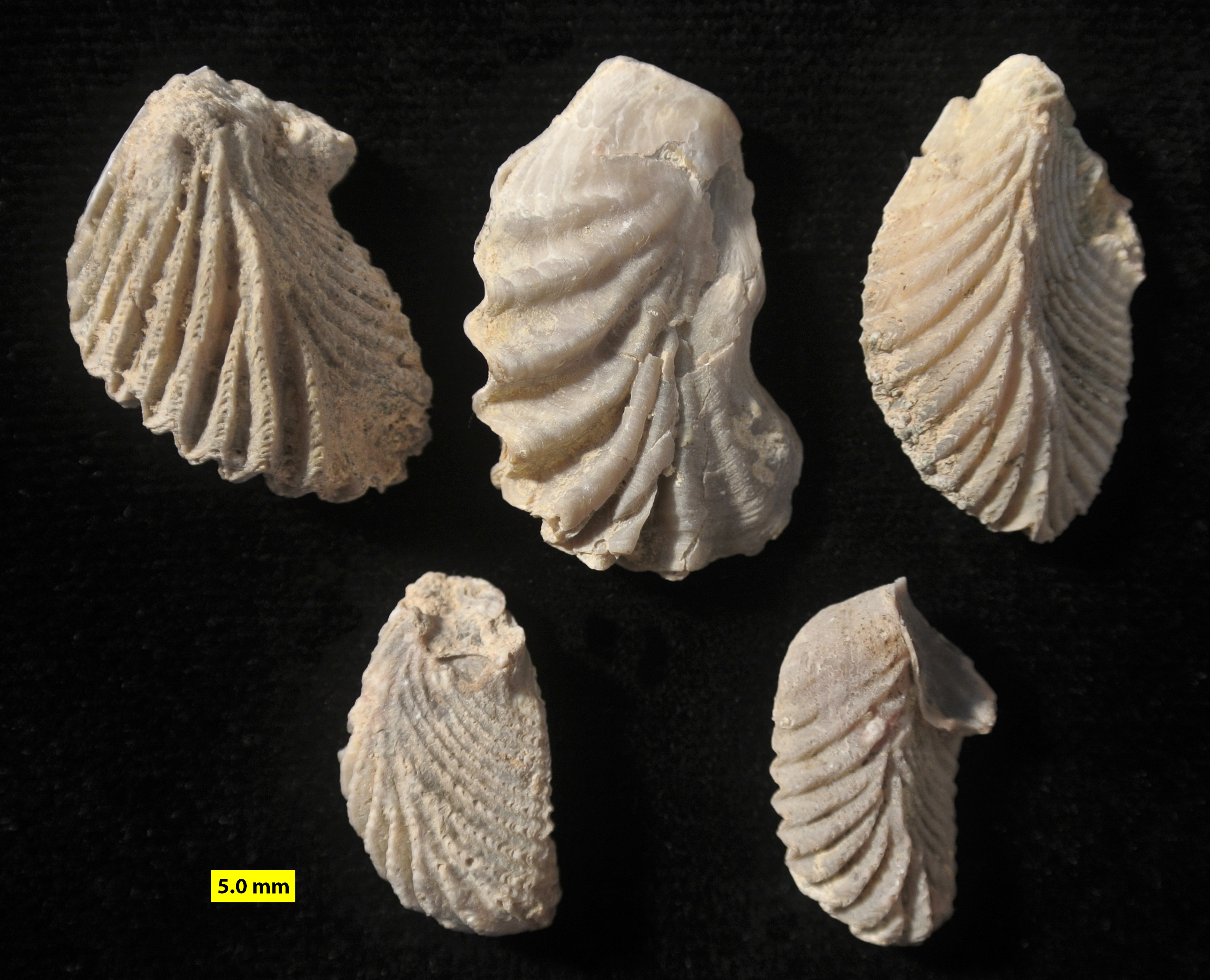
Actinostreon spp. from the Matmor Formation (Middle Jurassic, Callovian) of Makhtesh Gadol, southern Israel

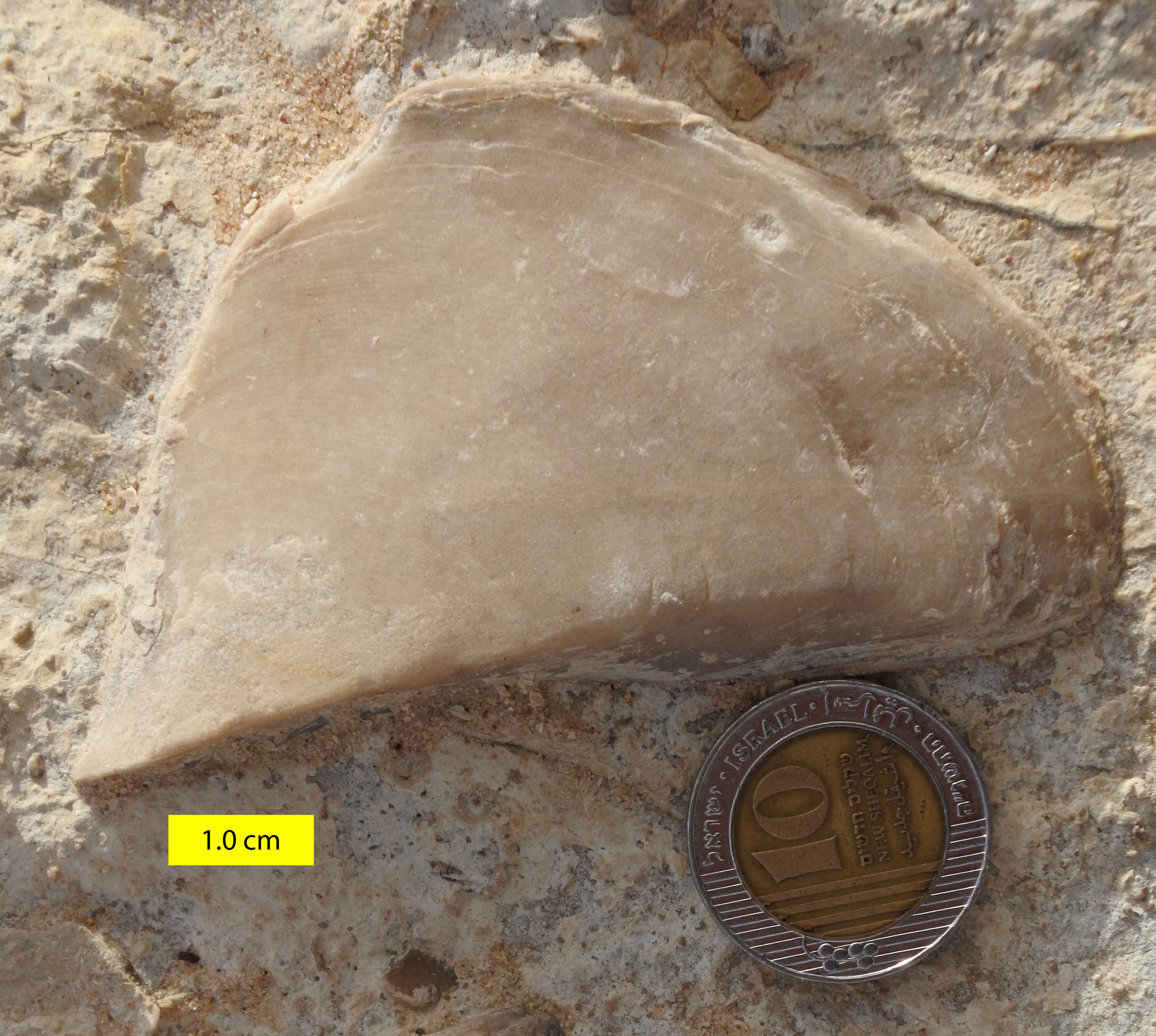
Mytilus (Falcimytilus) jurensis from the Middle Jurassic (Callovian) Matmor Formation of Makhtesh Gadol, southern Israel
