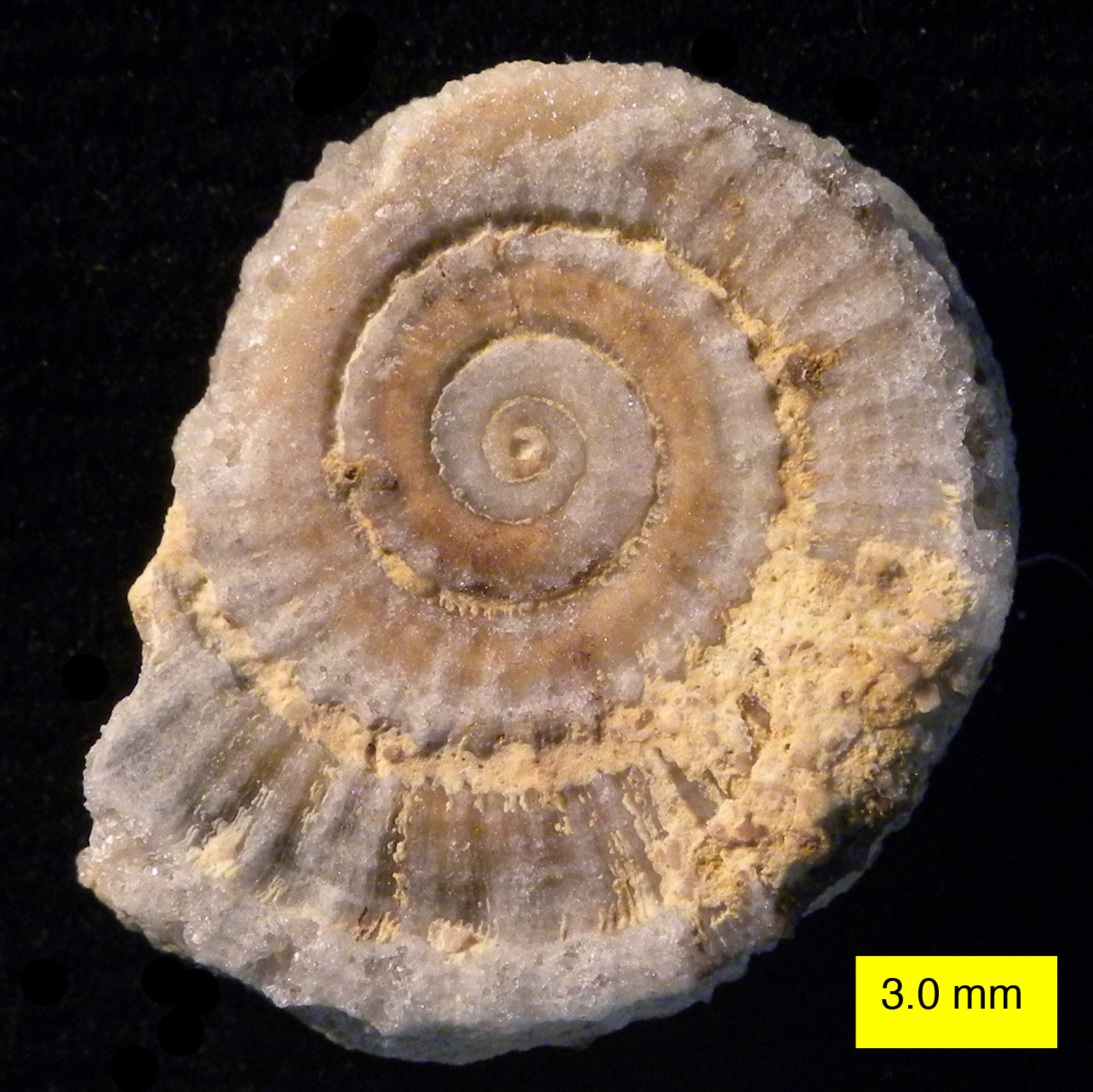
- Discohelix tunisiensis from the Matmor Formation (Middle Jurassic) of southern Israel.

Scientific classification
- Kingdom: Animalia
- Phylum: Mollusca
- Class: Gastropoda
- Subclass: Vetigastropoda
- Order: Pleurotomariida
- Family: †Discohelicidae
- Genus: †Discohelix; Dunker, 1847

= Discohelix =

Genus of gastropods

Discohelix is a genus of extinct sea snails, marine gastropod mollusks in the family Discohelicidae.

== Species ==
The following species were brought into synonymy:

- Discohelix hedleyi Mestayer, 1916 accepted as Zerotula hedleyi (Mestayer, 1916)

The following species are alternate representation:

- Discohelix retifera Dall, 1892 represented as Pseudotorinia retifera (Dall, 1892) (alternate representation), in turn accepted as Pseudotorinia (an unresolved species complex).
