= Carbonate hardgrounds =

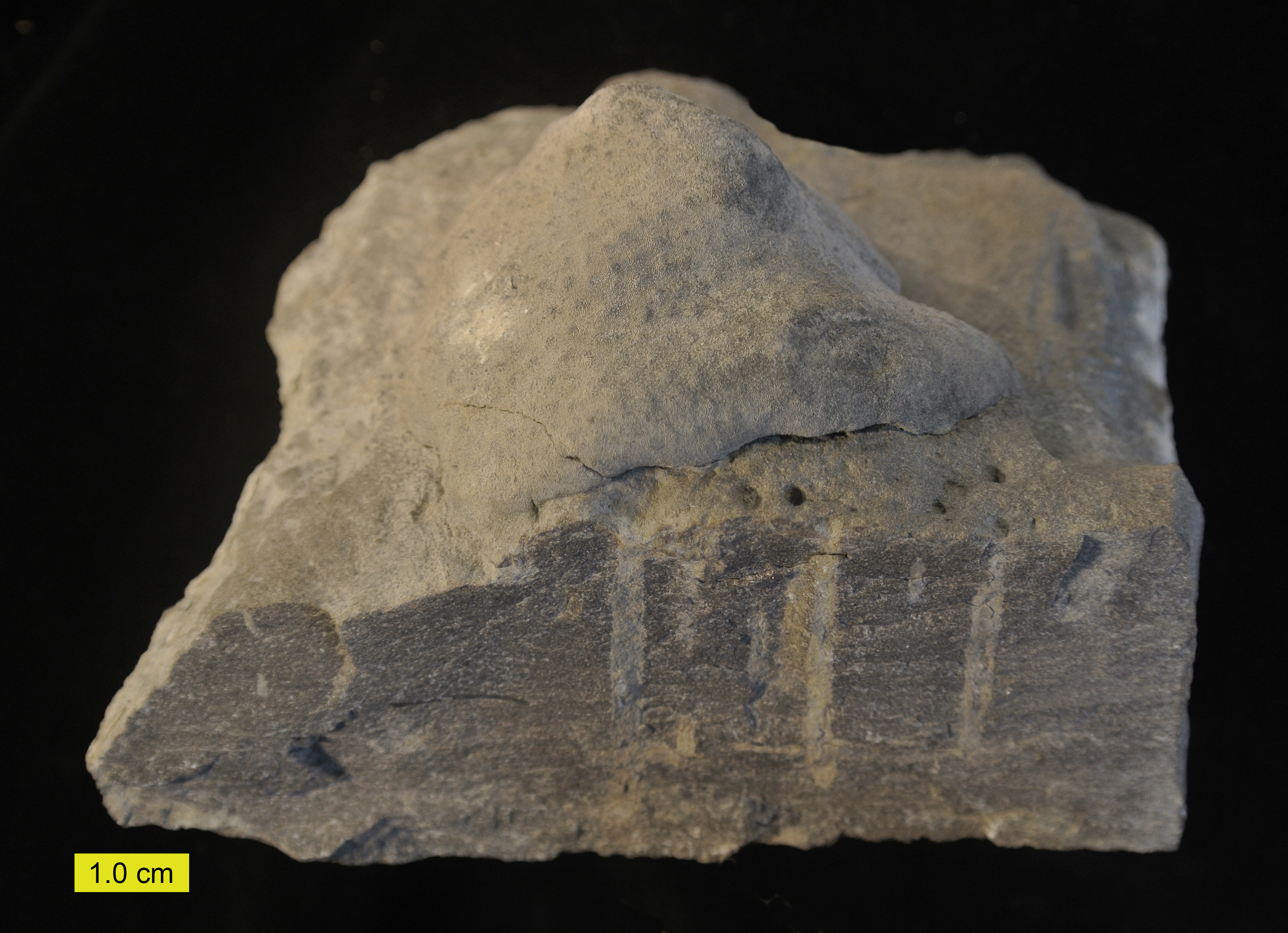
A carbonate hardground surface with a bryozoan and vertical borings (Trypanites) from the Upper Ordovician of Kentucky.

Carbonate hardgrounds are surfaces of synsedimentarily cemented carbonate layers that have been exposed on the seafloor (Wilson and Palmer, 1992). A hardground is essentially, then, a lithified seafloor. Ancient hardgrounds are found in limestone sequences and distinguished from later-lithified sediments by evidence of exposure to normal marine waters. This evidence can consist of encrusting marine organisms (especially bryozoans, oysters, barnacles, cornulitids, hederelloids, microconchids and crinoids), borings of organisms produced through bioerosion, early marine calcite cements, or extensive surfaces mineralized by iron oxides or calcium phosphates (Palmer, 1982; Bodenbender et al., 1989; Vinn and Wilson, 2010; Vinn and Toom, 2015). Modern hardgrounds are usually detected by sounding in shallow water or through remote sensing techniques like side-scan sonar.

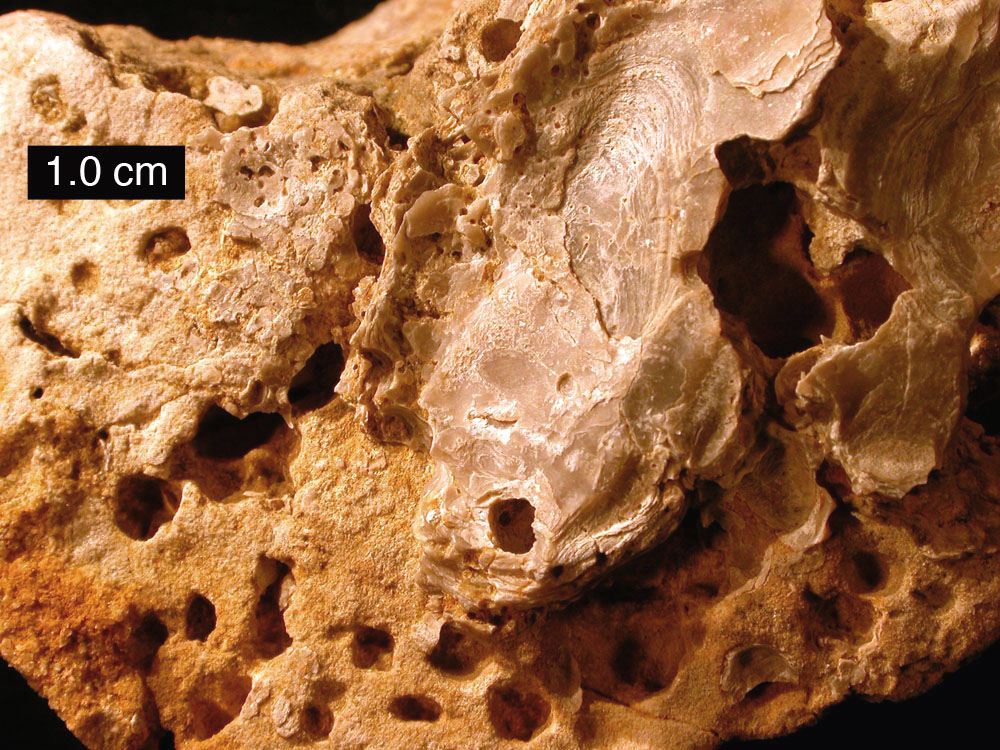
Cretaceous hardground from Texas with encrusting oysters and Gastrochaenolites borings. The scale bar is 1.0 cm.

Carbonate hardgrounds often host a unique fauna and flora adapted to the hard surface. Organisms usually cement themselves to the substrate and live as sessile filter-feeders (Brett and Liddell, 1982). Some bore into the cemented carbonate to make protective domiciles (borings) for filter-feeding. Sometimes hardgrounds are undermined by currents which remove the soft sediment below them, producing shallow cavities and caves which host a cryptic fauna (Palmer and Fürsich, 1974). The evolution of hardground faunas can be traced through the Phanerozoic, from the Cambrian Period to today (Taylor and Wilson, 2003).

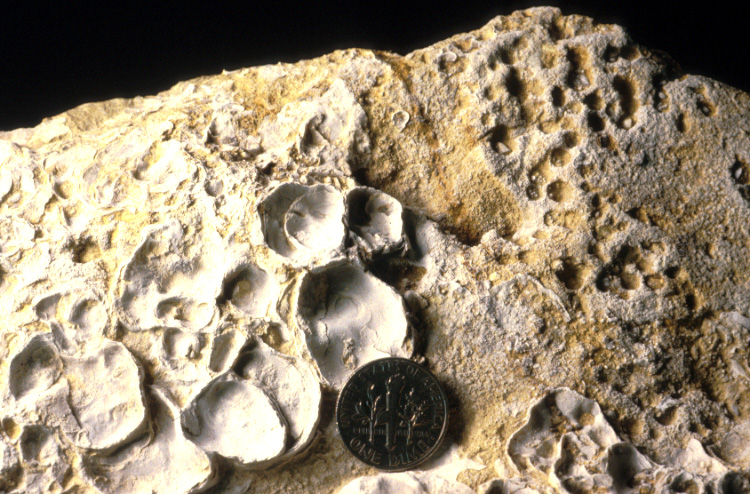
Middle Jurassic hardground (Carmel Formation) with encrusting oysters and borings.

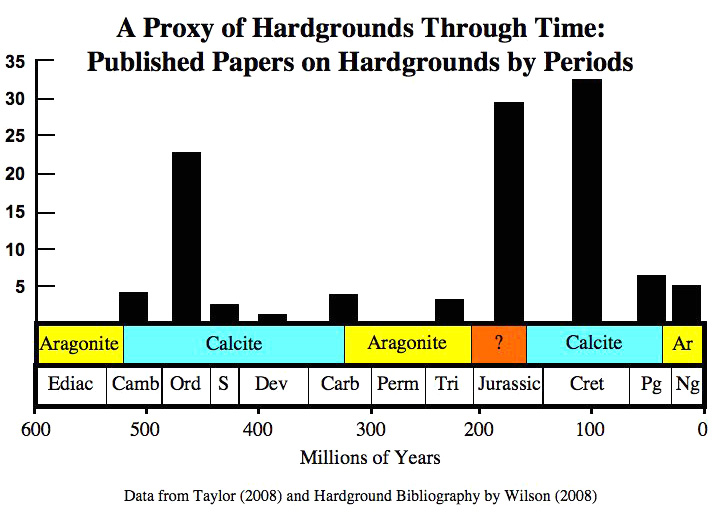
Scientific papers on hardgrounds by period. Serves as a proxy for hardground abundance over time. Aragonite and calcite sea intervals are plotted on the time axis.

Carbonate hardgrounds were most commonly formed during calcite sea intervals in Earth history, which were times of rapid precipitation of low-magnesium calcite and the dissolution of skeletal aragonite (Palmer and Wilson, 2004). The Ordovician-Silurian and the Jurassic-Cretaceous Systems have the most hardgrounds (sometimes hundreds in a single section) and the Permian-Triassic Systems have the least (usually none). This cyclicity in hardground formation is reflected in the evolution of hardground-dwelling communities. There are distinct differences between the Paleozoic and Mesozoic hardground communities: the former are dominated by thick calcitic bryozoans and echinoderms, the latter by oysters, deep bivalve (Gastrochaenolites) and sponge (Entobia) borings (Taylor and Wilson, 2003).

Stratigraphers and sedimentologists often use hardgrounds as marker horizons and as indicators of sedimentary hiatuses and flooding events (Fürsich et al., 1981, 1992; Pope and Read, 1997). Hardgrounds and their faunas can also represent very specific depositional environments such as tidal channels (Wilson et al., 2005) and shallow marine carbonate ramps (Palmer and Palmer, 1977; Malpas et al., 2004)

== Gallery ==
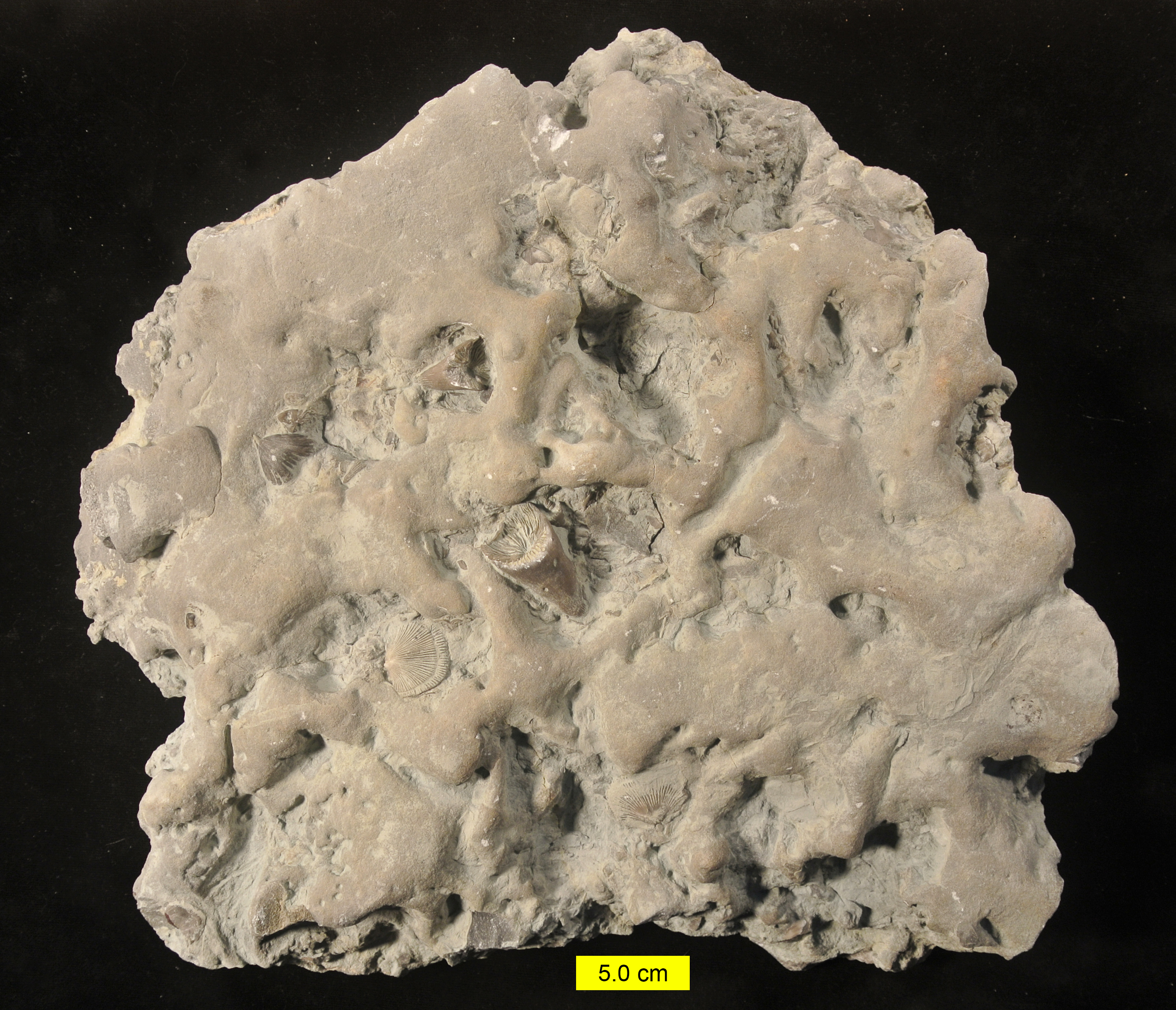
Hardground in the Liberty Formation (Upper Ordovician) of southern Ohio.

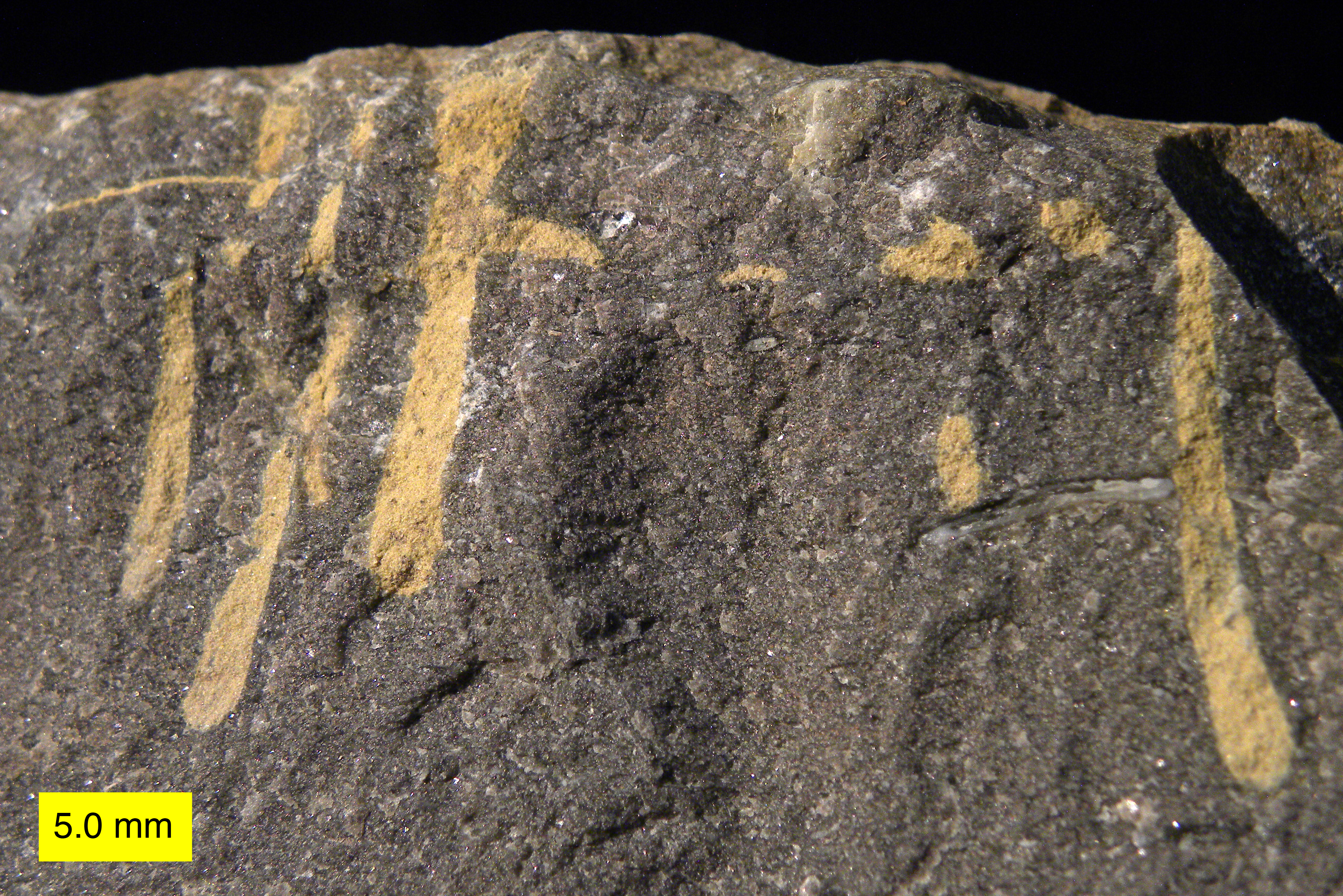
Cross-section of an Upper Ordovician hardground from Kentucky. The light-colored vertical elements are borings (Trypanites) filled with dolomite. The scale bar is 1.0 cm.

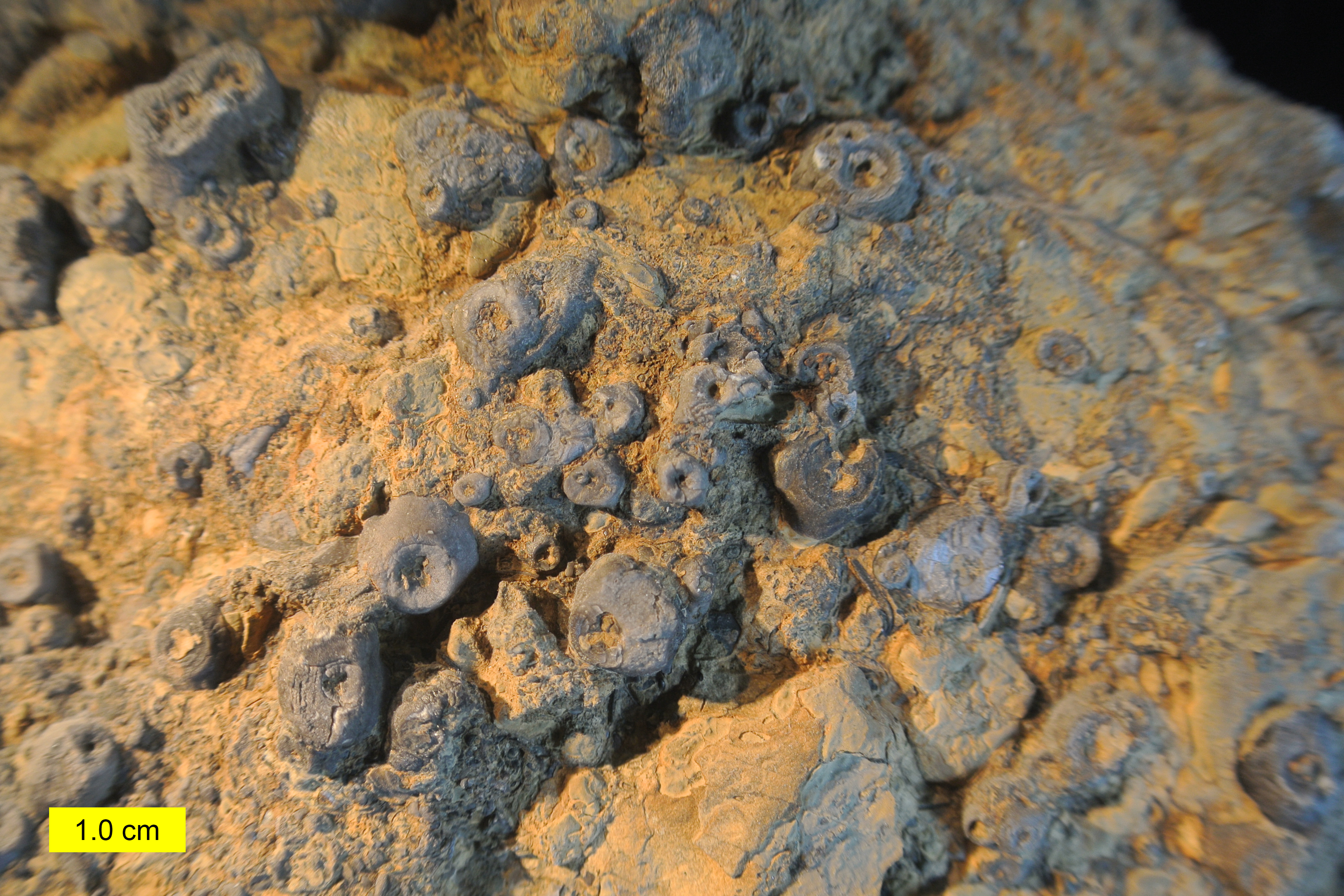
A Middle Ordovician hardground from the Kanosh Formation of Utah with echinoderm holdfasts cemented to its upper surface. The scale bar is 1.0 cm.

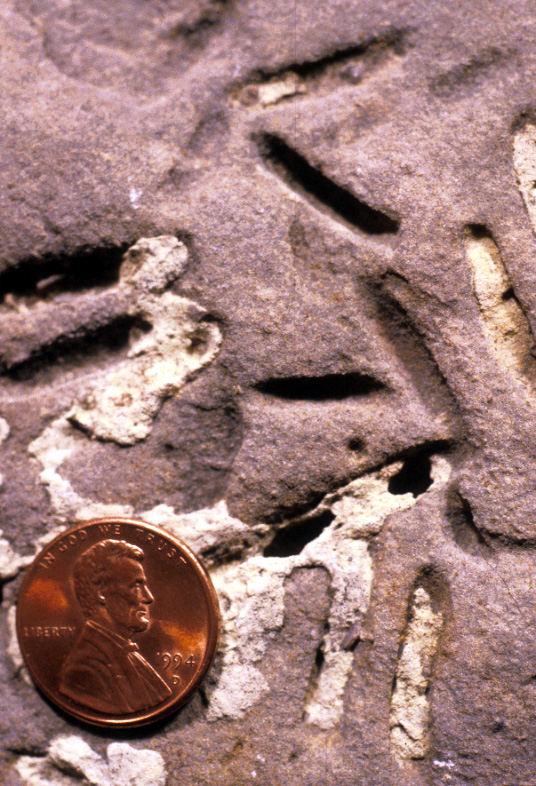
Petroxestes borings in an Upper Ordovician hardground, southern Ohio.

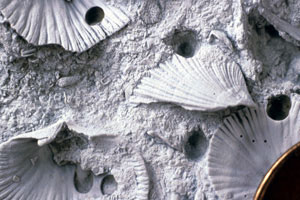
Trypanites borings in an Upper Ordovician hardground, Indiana.

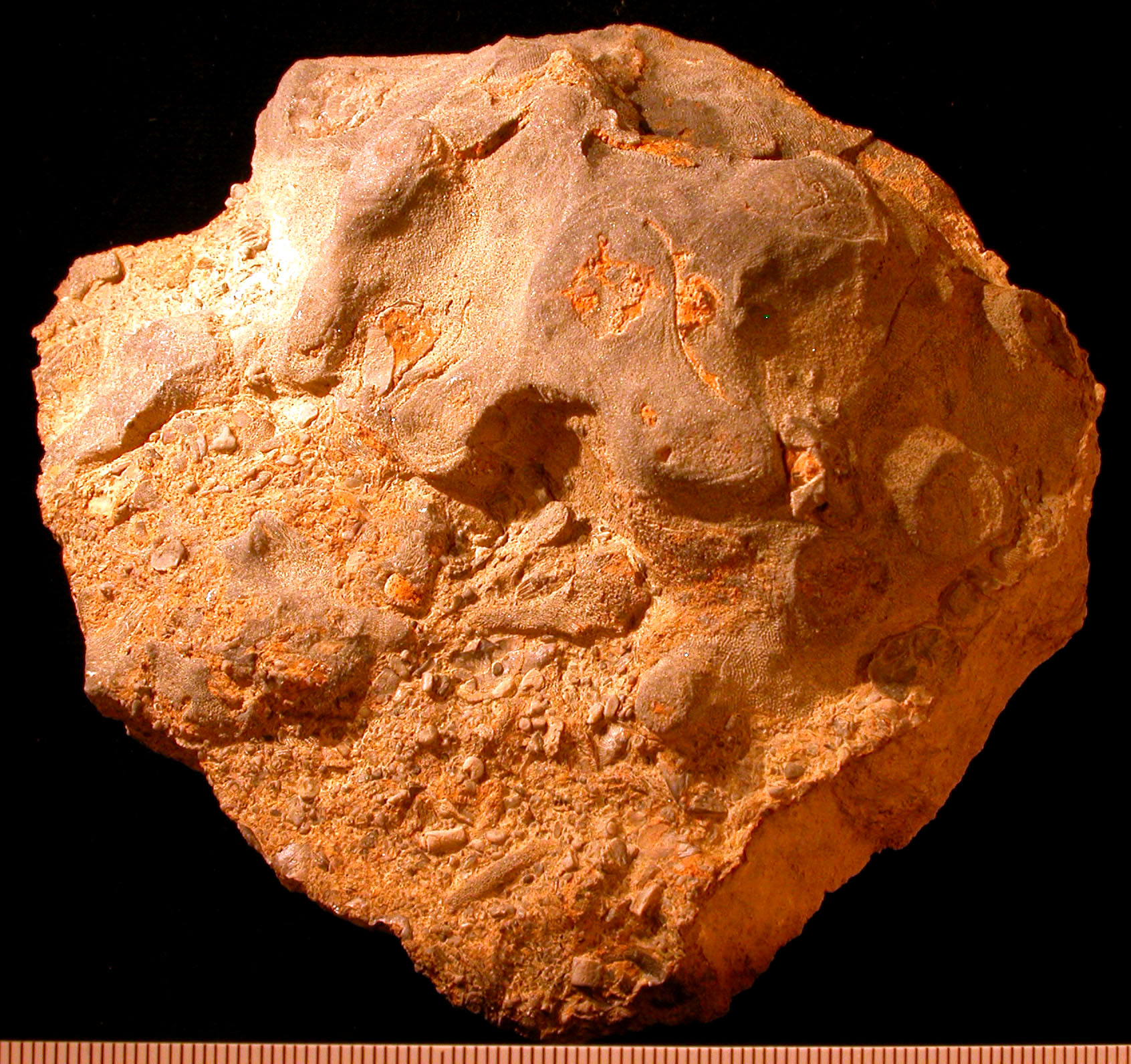
Carbonate hardground with an encrusting bryozoan; Kanosh Formation (Middle Ordovician) of Utah; scale in mm.

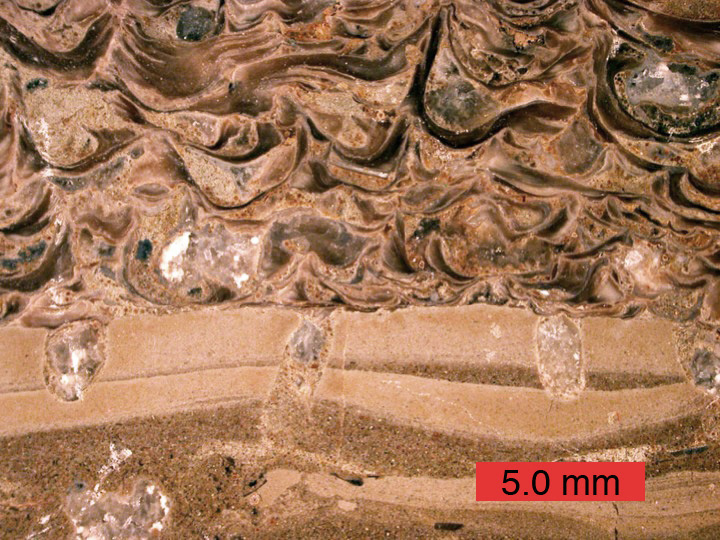
Cross-section of a carbonate hardground encrusted by oysters and bored by bivalves (Gastrochaenolites); Carmel Formation (Middle Jurassic) of southern Utah.

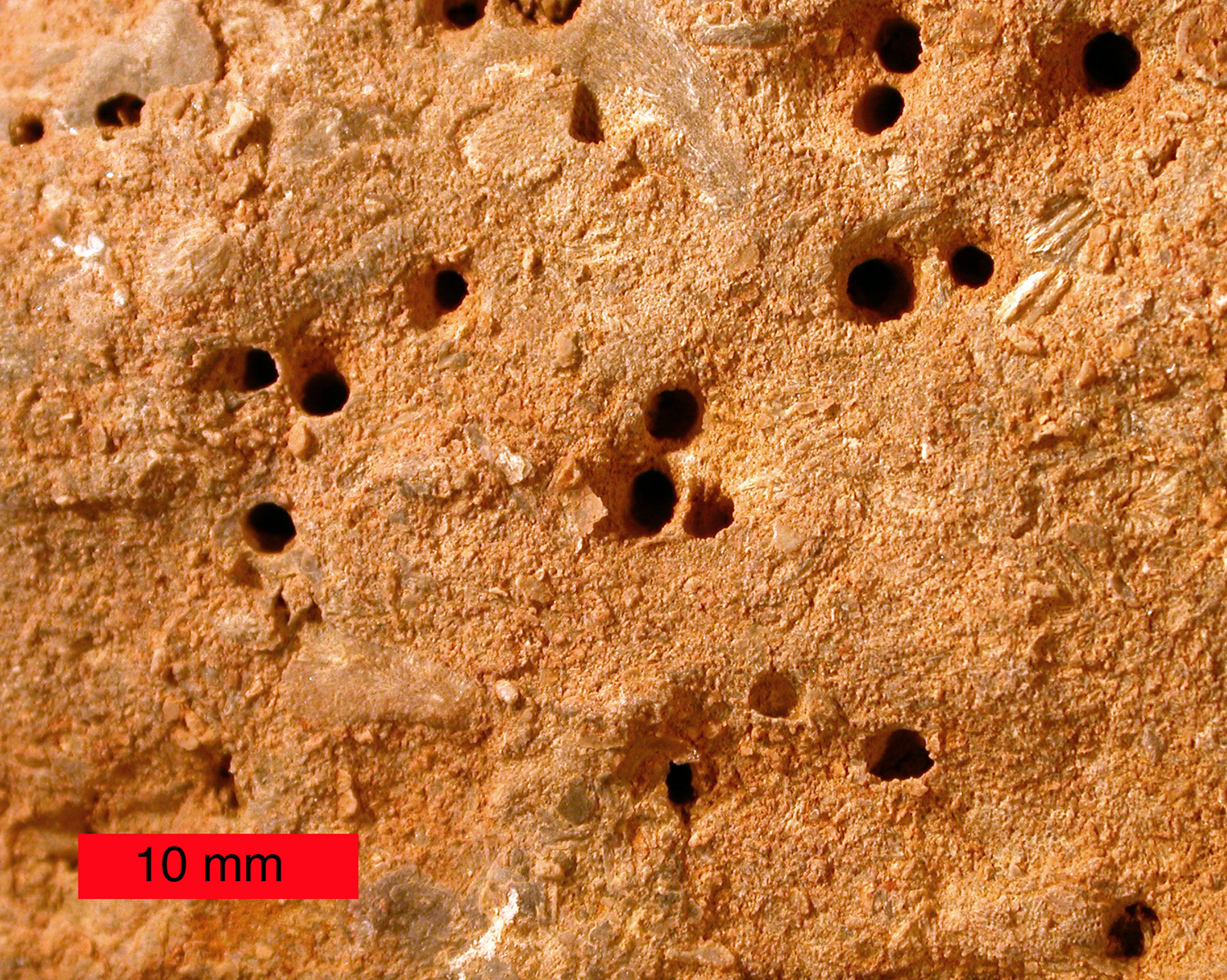
Trypanites borings in an Upper Ordovician hardground from northern Kentucky.

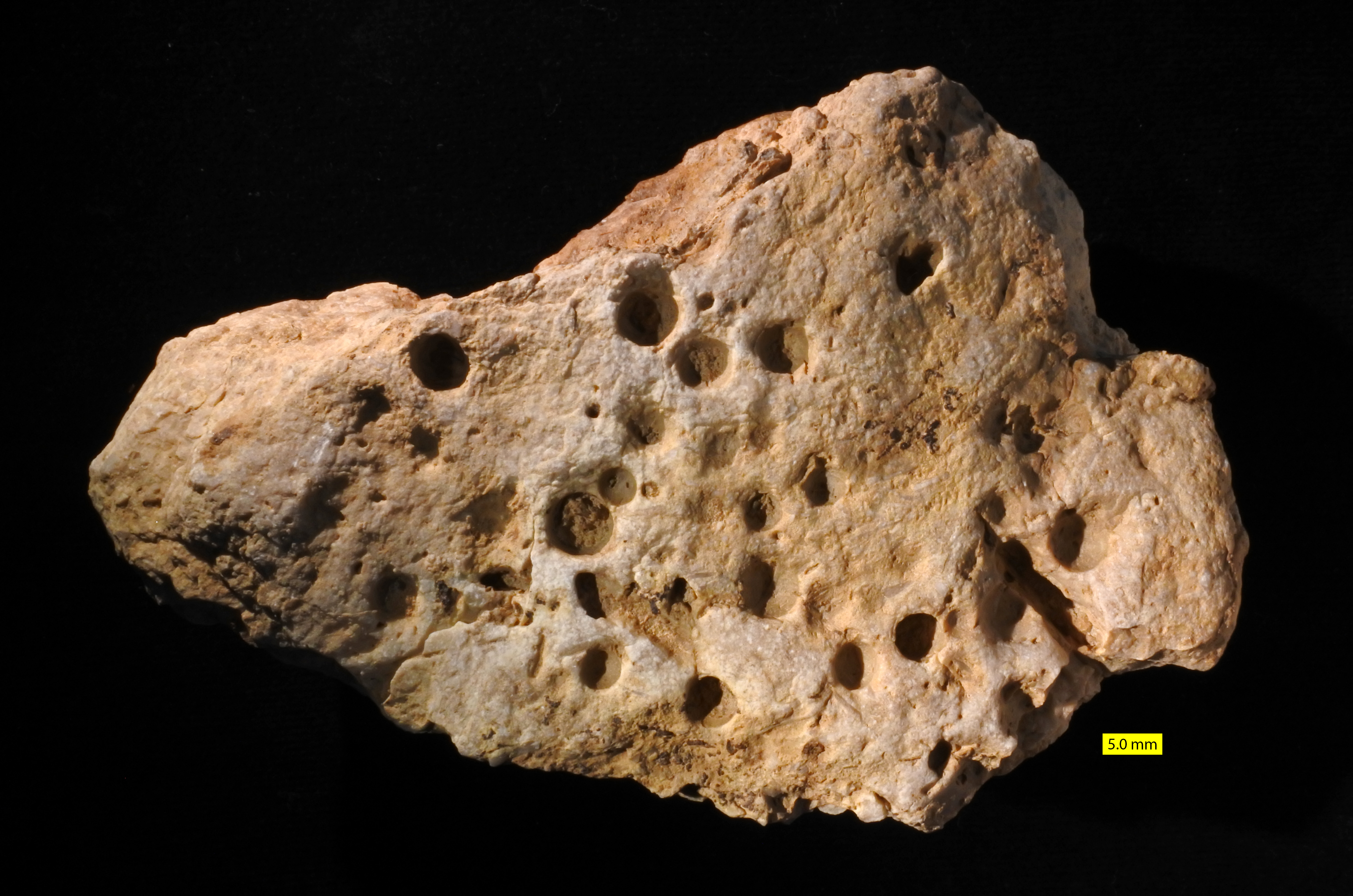
Carbonate hardground; Ora Formation, Upper Cretaceous (Turonian), southern Israel.
