= Discohelicidae =

Scientific classification
- Kingdom: Animalia
- Phylum: Mollusca
- Class: Gastropoda
- Subclass: Vetigastropoda
- Order: Pleurotomariida
- Superfamily: †Porcellioidea
- Family: †Discohelicidae; Schröder, 1995

Extinct family of gastropods

Discohelicidae is an extinct family of sea snails with planispiral shells, marine gastropod mollusks in the clade Vetigastropoda (according to the taxonomy of the Gastropoda by Bouchet & Rocroi, 2005).

This family has no subfamilies.

== Genera ==
Genera within the family Discohelicidae include:

- Amphitomaria
- Discohelix
- Spiniomphalus
