= Porcellioidea =

Scientific classification
- Kingdom: Animalia
- Phylum: Mollusca
- Class: Gastropoda
- Subclass: Vetigastropoda
- Order: Pleurotomariida
- Superfamily: †Porcellioidea; Koken, 1895

Families
- See text

Extinct superfamily of gastropods

Porcellioidea is an extinct superfamily of small to large sea snails, marine gastropod mollusks in the clade Vetigastropoda.

This superfamily dates back to the Paleozoic. They developed sinistrally (left-handed) or planispirally coiled teleoconchs.

== Taxonomy ==
Bouchet & Rocroi based their classification on the study by Bandel, published in 1993. However, the position of the Porcelliidae is unsure, as noted by Peter J. Wagner in 2002. Wagner reported that the Porcelliidae belongs to the subfamily Gosseletininae, family Gosseletinidae, in the superfamily Eotomarioidea.

This superfamily consists of the four following families (according to the taxonomy of the Gastropoda by Bouchet & Rocroi, 2005):

- † family Porcelliidae Koken, 1895
- † family Cirridae Cossmann, 1916
- † family Discohelicidae Schröder, 1995
- † family Pavlodiscidae Frýda, 1998

(Families that are exclusively fossil are indicated with a dagger †)
