= Porcelliidae =

Scientific classification
- Kingdom: Animalia
- Phylum: Mollusca
- Class: Gastropoda
- Subclass: Vetigastropoda
- Order: Pleurotomariida
- Superfamily: †Porcellioidea
- Family: †Porcelliidae; Zittel, 1895

Extinct family of gastropods

Porcelliidae is an extinct family of gastropods in the order Pleurotomariida.

== Taxonomy ==
The following taxa are assigned to this family:

- Family Porcelliidae
  - Subfamily Agnesiinae Knight, 1956 †
    - Tribe Agnesiini Knight, 1956 †
      - Genus Agnesia de Koninck, 1883 †
    - Genus Alaskiella Frýda & Blodgett, 1998 †
    - Tribe Anoriostomatini Frýda & Farrell, 2005 †
      - Genus Anoriostoma Farrell, 1992 †
    - Genus Garraspira Frýda & Farrell, 2005 †
    - Genus Hesperiella Holzapfel, 1889 †
    - Genus Koneprusellia Frýda, 1998 †
    - Genus Paragnesia Blodgett & Frýda, 1999 †
    - Genus Pauquysia Frýda, 2004 †
    - Genus Pernericirrus Frýda, 1997 †
    - Genus Sasakiela Bandel & Frýda, 2004 †
    - Genus Trochagnesia Heidelberger, 2001 †
- Genus Faxetrochus Schnetler & Lozouet, 2012 †
- Subfamily Porcelliinae Zittel, 1895 †
  - Genus Porcellia Léveillé, 1835 †
