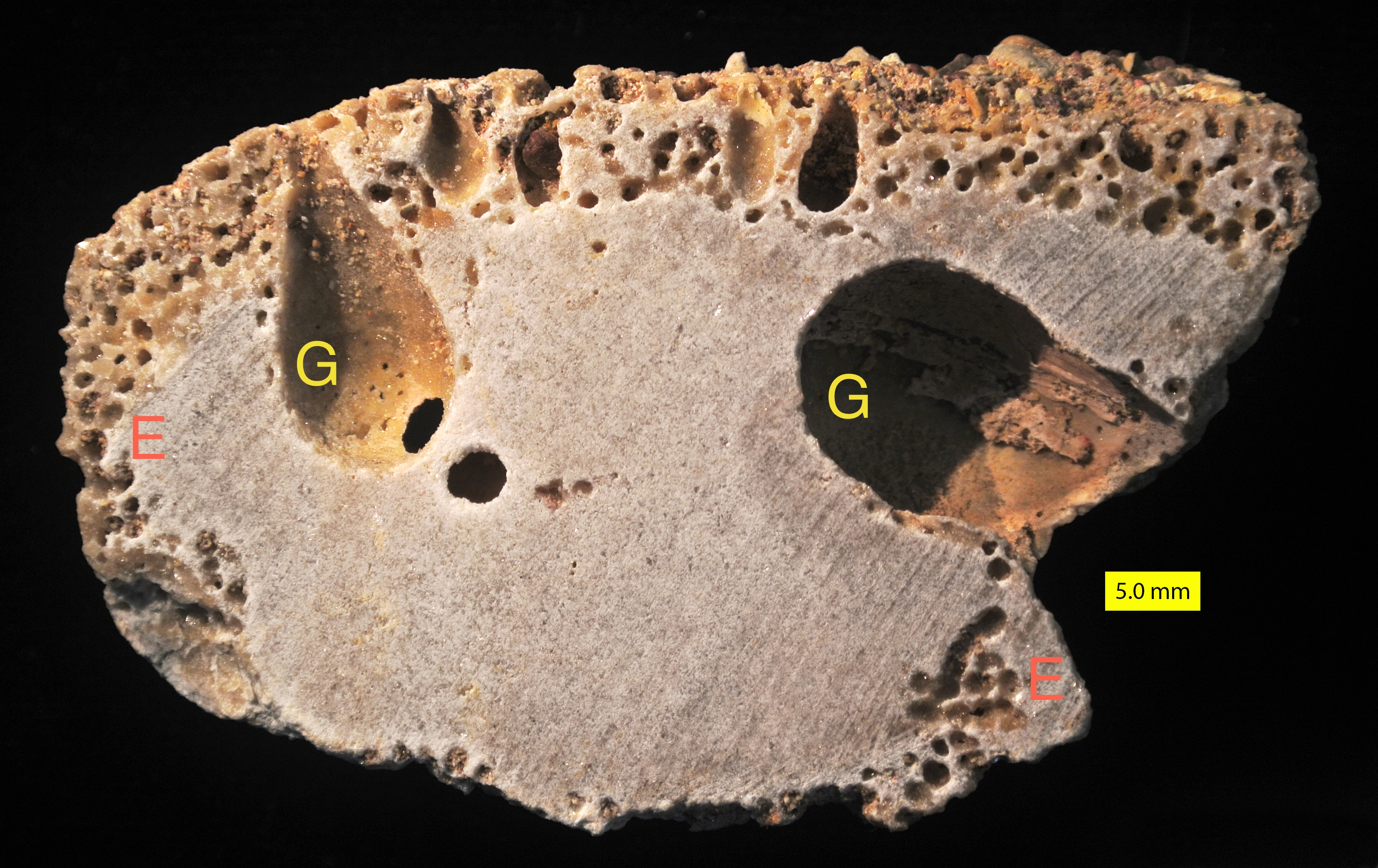
- Gastrochaenolites (G) and Entobia (E) in limestone cobble from the Los Banós Formation, Upper Miocene, SE Spain.

Trace fossil classification
- Ichnofamily: †Gastrochaenolitidae
- Ichnogenus: †Gastrochaenolites; Leymerie, 1842

Type ichnospecies
- Gastrochaenolites lapidicus Kelly & Bromley, 1984

Ichnospecies
- G. ampullatus Kelly & Bromley, 1984; G. anauchen Wilson & Palmer, 1998; G. cluniformis Kelly & Bromley, 1984; G. cor Bromley & D’Alessandro, 1987; G. dijugus Kelly & Bromley, 1984; G. hospitium Kleemann, 2009; G. japonicus (Hatai et al., 1974); G. lapidicus Kelly & Bromley, 1984; G. oelandicus Ekdale & Bromley, 2001; G. orbicularis Kelly & Bromley, 1984; G. ornatus Kelly & Bromley, 1984; G. pickerilli Donovan, 2002; G. raigadensis (Badve & Ghare, 1984); G. turbinatus Kelly & Bromley, 1984; G. vivus Edinger & Risk, 1994

Synonyms
- Moniopterus Hatai et al., 1974; Paleolithophaga Chiplonkar & Ghare, 1976; Paleolithopholas Badve & Ghare, 1984

= Gastrochaenolites =

Trace fossil

Gastrochaenolites is a trace fossil formed as a clavate (club-shaped) boring in a hard substrate such as a shell, rock or carbonate hardground. The aperture of the boring is narrower than the main chamber and may be circular, oval, or dumb-bell shaped. Gastrochaenolites is most commonly attributed to bioeroding bivalves such as Lithophaga and Gastrochaena. The fossil ranges from the Ordovician to the Recent. The first Lower Jurassic Gastrochaenolites ichnospecies is Gastrochaenolites messisbugi Bassi, Posenato, Nebelsick, 2017. This is the first record of boreholes and their producers (mytilid bivalves) in one of the larger bivalves of the globally occurring Lithiotis fauna which is a unique facies in the Lower Jurassic Tethys and Panthalassa.
