= Cirridae =

Scientific classification
- Kingdom: Animalia
- Phylum: Mollusca
- Class: Gastropoda
- Subclass: Vetigastropoda
- Order: Pleurotomariida
- Superfamily: †Porcellioidea
- Family: †Cirridae; Cossmann, 1916

Extinct family of gastropods

Cirridae is an extinct family of fossil sea snails, marine gastropod mollusks in the superfamily Porcellioidea (according to the taxonomy of the Gastropoda by Bouchet & Rocroi, 2005).

These snails date from the Mesozoic era, and are sinistral in their shell-coiling.

== Taxonomy ==
This family consists of three following subfamilies (according to the taxonomy of the Gastropoda by Bouchet & Rocroi, 2005):

- Cirrinae Cossmann, 1916
- Platyacrinae Wenz, 1938 – synonym: Hesperocirrinae O. Haas, 1953
- Cassianocirrinae Bandel, 1993

== Genera and species ==
Genera and species within the family Cirridae include:

- Alaskacirrus Frýda & Blodgett, 1998 -=– from the Devonian of west-central Alaska
  - Alaskacirrus bandeli Frýda & Blodgett, 1998
