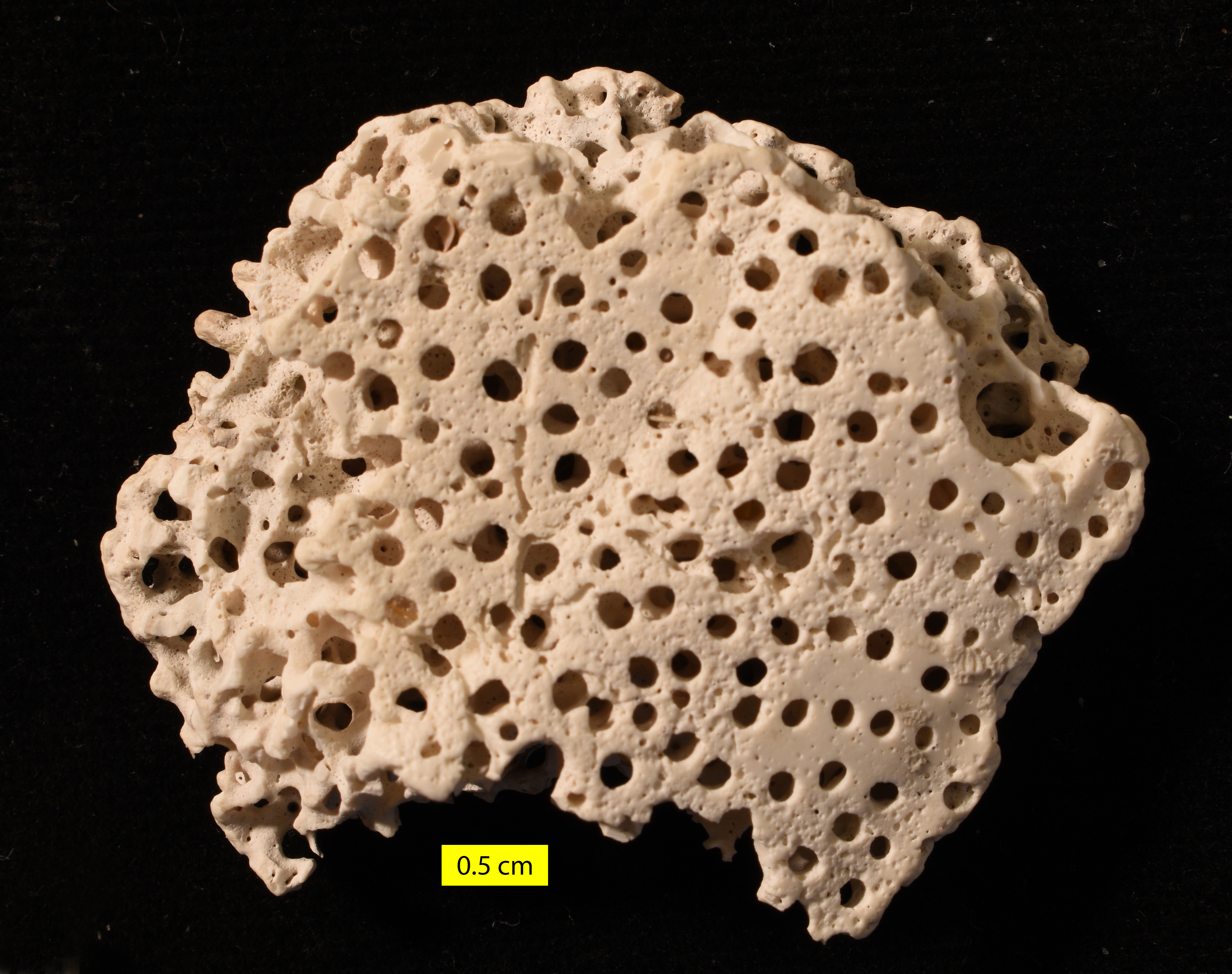
- Modern Entobia borings in a bivalve shell

Trace fossil classification
- Ichnofamily: †Entobiaidae
- Ichnogenus: †Entobia; Bronn, 1838

Type ichnospecies
- Entobia cretacea Portlock, 1843

Ichnospecies
- List: E. cretacea Portlock, 1843; E. michelini (Nardo, 1845); E. glomerata (Michelin, 1846); E. nardina (Michelin, 1846); E. duvernoyi (Michelin, 1847); E. irregularis (d'Orbigny, 1850); E. ramosa (d'Orbigny, 1850); E. parisiensis (d'Orbigny, 1850); E. dissociata (Duchassaing, 1850); E. duvernoysii (Duchassaing, 1850); E. pectita (Michelotti, 1861); E. strombi (Duchassaing de Fonbressin & Michelotti, 1864); E. megastoma (Fischer in d'Archiac et al., 1866); E. falunica (Fischer in d'Archiac et al., 1866); E. cerithii (Fraas, 1867); E. paradoxa (Fischer, 1868); E. praecursor (Fischer, 1868); E. cerithiorum (Fischer, 1868); E. tubulosa (Seguenza, 1879); E. perforata (Seguenza, 1882); E. intricata (Seguenza, 1882); E. catenata (Frič, 1883); E. exogyrarum (Frič, 1883); E. mammillata (Chapman, 1907); E. peregrinator (Chapman, 1907); E. bullini (Annandale, 1920); E. devonica (Clarke, 1921); E. radiciformis (Lehner, 1937); E. microtuberum (Stephenson, 1941); E. retiformis (Stephenson, 1952); E. cateniformis Bromley & D'Alessandro, 1984; E. geometrica Bromley & D'Alessandro, 1984; E. laquea Bromley & D'Alessandro, 1984; E. ovula Bromley & D'Alessandro, 1984; E. volzi Bromley & D'Alessandro, 1984; E. depressa Ghare, 1985; E. dendritica Pleydell & Jones, 1988; E. gigantea Bromley & D'Alessandro, 1989; E. magna Bromley & D'Alessandro, 1989; E. parva Bromley & D'Alessandro, 1989; E. astrologica Mikuláš, 1992; E. solaris Mikuláš, 1992; E. goniodes Bromley & Asgaard, 1993; E. cervicornis Fürsich et al., 1994; E. convoluta Edinger & Risk, 1994; E. micra Wisshak, 2008; E. nana Wisshak, 2008; E. cracoviensis Bromley & Uchman in Bromley et al., 2009; E. resinensis Santos et al., 2011; E. colaria Wisshak et al., 2017; E. morrisi Wisshak, Knaust & Bertling, 2019; E. tuberculata Wisshak, Knaust & Bertling, 2019

Synonyms
- Clionites Morris in Mantell, 1850; Topsentia Clarke, 1921 (junior homonym); Topsentopsis de Laubenfels in Moore, 1955; Uniglobites Pleydell & Jones, 1988

= Entobia =

Entobia Temporal range: Devonian–Holocene

Trace fossil

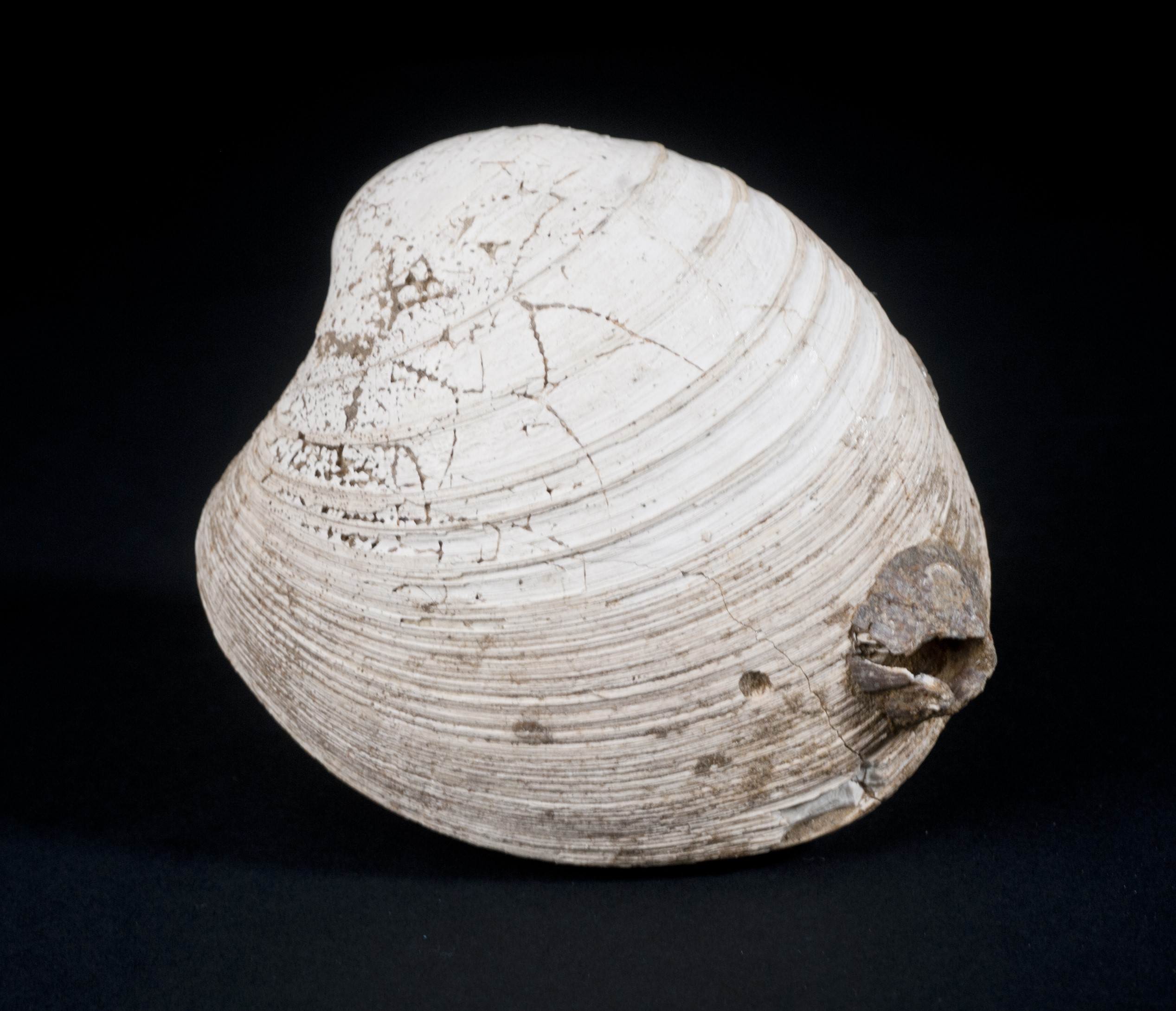
Entobia borings on the fossil shell of the bivalve "Pelecyora gigas" (Lamarck, 1818), Pliocene of Tuscany, Italy, (Natural History Museum University of Pisa)

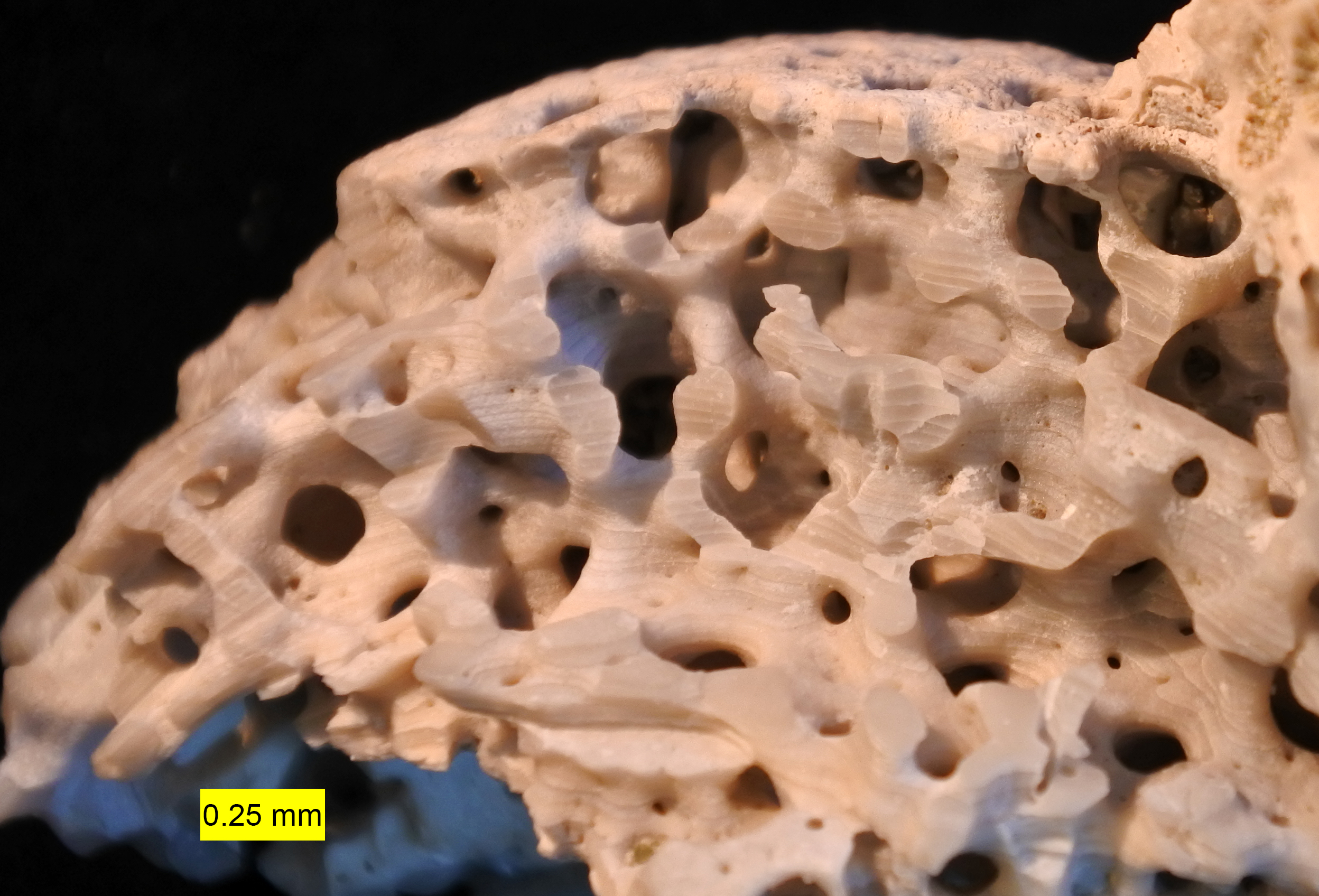
Entobia in a bivalve shell, Florida.

Entobia is a trace fossil in a hard substrate (typically a shell, rock or hardground made of calcium carbonate) formed by sponges as a branching network of galleries, often with regular enlargements termed chambers. Apertural canals connect the outer surface of the substrate to the chambers and galleries so the sponge can channel water through its tissues for filter feeding. The fossil ranges from the Devonian to the Recent.
