= Anthracopupidae =

Scientific classification
- Kingdom: Animalia
- Phylum: Mollusca
- Class: Gastropoda
- Order: Stylommatophora
- Suborder: Helicina
- Infraorder: Pupilloidei
- Superfamily: †Dendropupoidea
- Family: †Anthracopupidae; Wenz, 1938

Extinct family of gastropods

Anthracopupidae is an extinct family of fossil land snails in the clade Caenogastropoda.
