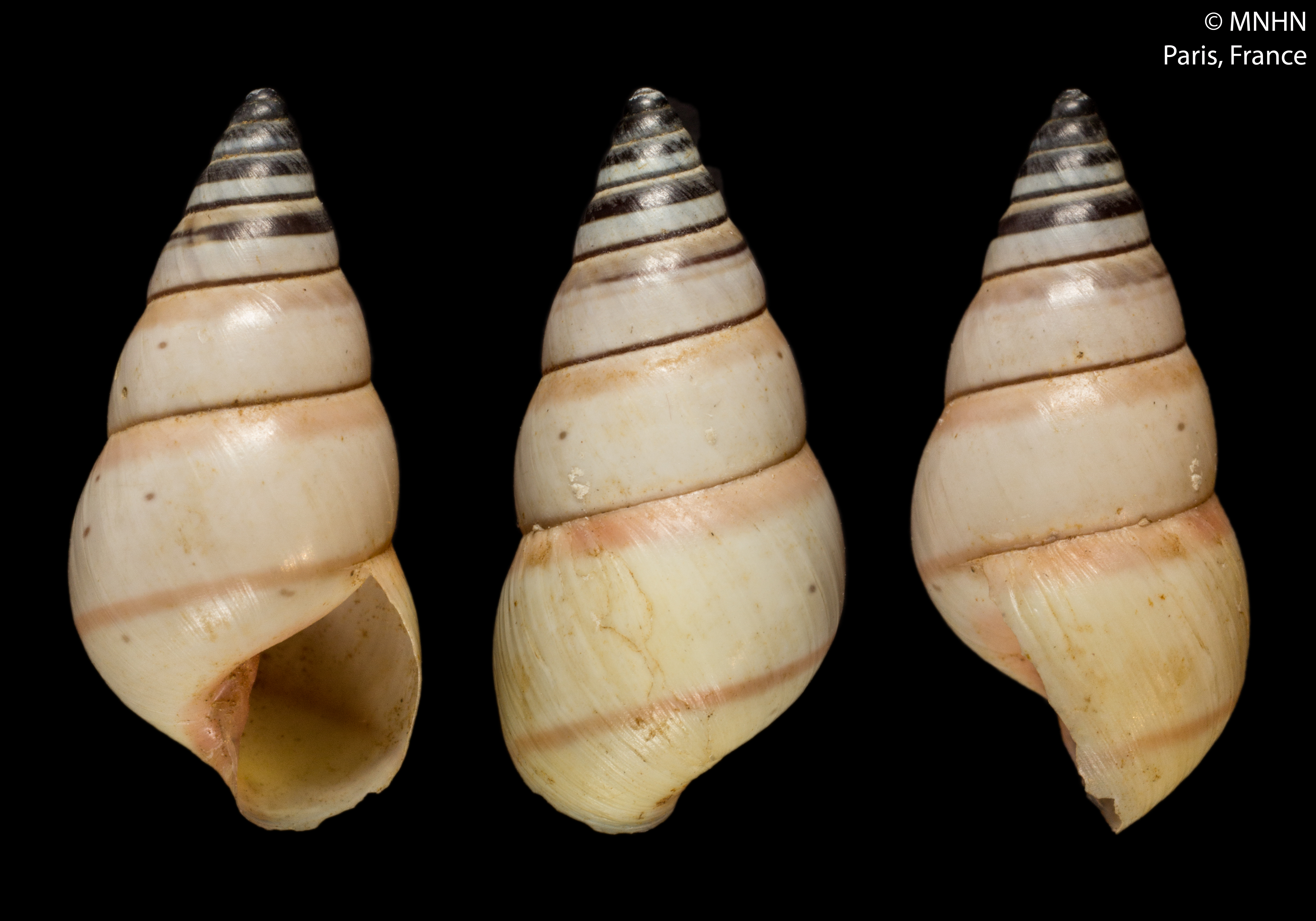
- Shell of Rachis venusta (syntype at MNHN, Paris)

Scientific classification
- Kingdom: Animalia
- Phylum: Mollusca
- Class: Gastropoda
- Order: Stylommatophora
- Infraorder: Pupilloidei
- Superfamily: Pupilloidea
- Family: Cerastidae
- Genus: Rachis; Albers, 1850

Type species
- Bulimus pallens Jonas, 1843

Synonyms
- Buliminus (Rachis) Albers, 1850; Buliminus (Rhachis) L. Pfeiffer, 1856; Bulimus (Rachis) Albers, 1850 (original rank); Bulimus (Rhachis) L. Pfeiffer, 1856 (superseded combination); Ena (Rachisellus) Bourguignat, 1890 (junior synonym); Rachis (Rachis) Albers, 1850; Rachisellus Bourguignat, 1890; Rhachis L. Pfeiffer, 1856 (invalid: unjustified emendation of Rachis Albers, 1850)

= Rachis (gastropod) =

Genus of gastropods

Rachis is a genus of air-breathing land snails, terrestrial pulmonate gastropod molluscs in the family Cerastidae.

This genus is also spelled as “Rhachis” as a synonym. Rachis is a Latinised version of rhachis (a midrib or ridge) or rhachos (a thorn or thorn bush), both of which are Greek nouns of feminine gender.

== Species ==
- Rachis ambongoensis Fischer-Piette, 1964
- Rachis aurea (Heude, 1890)
- Rachis badiola (Morelet, 1881)
- Rachis bewsheri (Morelet, 1877)
- Rachis catenata (E. von Martens, 1860)
- Rachis comorensis (Morelet, 1881)
- Rachis cunctatoris van Bruggen, 1975
- Rachis electrina (Morelet, 1864)
- Rachis elongatula Bourguignat, 1890
- Rachis fagotiana (Ancey, 1885)
- Rachis genalensis Kobelt, 1910
- Rachis gracillima F. Haas, 1936
- Rachis humbloti (Morelet, 1888) (accepted > unreplaced junior homonym)
- Rachis ingenua (Morelet, 1864)
- Rachis jejuna (Melvill & Ponsonby, 1893)
- Rachis nigrilineata (Reeve, 1849)
- Rachis obeliscus C. R. Boettger, 1913
- Rachis pachistoma Bourguignat, 1890
- Rachis punctata (Anton, 1838)
- Rachis stahlbergi C. R. Boettger, 1913
- Rachis tulearensis Fischer-Piette, 1964
- Rachis venusta (Morelet, 1861)
- Rachis zonulata (L. Pfeiffer, 1846)

Synonyms

- Rachis aldabrae (E. von Martens, 1898): synonym of Rhachistia aldabrae (E. von Martens, 1898) (unaccepted combination)
- Rachis badiolus: synonym of Rachis badiola (Morelet, 1881) (incorrect grammatical agreement of specific epithet)
- Rachis bidwilli (Cox, 1868): synonym of Rhachistia histrio (L. Pfeiffer, 1855)
- Rachis bloyeti Bourguignat, 1890: synonym of Rhachidina braunsii (E. von Martens, 1869): synonym of Rhachistia braunsii (E. von Martens, 1869) (junior synonym)
- Rachis boehmi (E. von Martens, 1895): synonym of Rhachistia boehmi (E. von Martens, 1895)
- Rachis braunsii (E. von Martens, 1869): synonym of Rhachistia braunsii (E. von Martens, 1869) (superseded combination)
- Rachis burnayi (Dohrn, 1866): synonym of Gittenedouardia burnayi (Dohrn, 1866)
- Rachis burtoi (Bourguignat, 1890): synonym of Rachis punctata (Anton, 1838) (junior synonym)
- Rachis chalcedonica (Gredler, 1887): synonym of Mirus chalcedonicus (Gredler, 1887) (unaccepted combination)
- Rachis dohrni (Greeff, 1882): synonym of Aporachis dohrni (Greeff, 1882)
- Rachis eminula (Morelet, 1848): synonym of Gittenedouardia eminula (Morelet, 1848)
- Rachis erlangeri Kobelt, 1910: synonym of Rhachistia erlangeri (Kobelt, 1910) (unaccepted combination)
- Rachis fagotianus: synonym of Rachis fagotiana (Ancey, 1885) (incorrect grammatical agreement of specific epithet)
- Rachis hieroglyphicus Preston, 1910: synonym of Rachis hieroglyphica Preston, 1910 (incorrect grammatical agreement of specific epithet)
- Rachis hispida (Greeff, 1882): synonym of Aporachis hispida (Greeff, 1882)
- Rachis ingenuus: synonym of Rachis ingenua (Morelet, 1864) (incorrect grammatical agreement of specific epithet)
- Rachis jouberti Bourguignat, 1890: synonym of Rhachidina braunsii var. succincta (E. von Martens, 1879): synonym of Rhachistia braunsii (E. von Martens, 1869)
- Rachis libbahensis (Tomlin, 1910): synonym of Zebrinops libbahensis (Tomlin, 1910)
- Rachis moluensis Kobelt, 1910: synonym of Rhachistia moluensis (Kobelt, 1910)
- Rachis nigrilineatus (Reeve, 1849): synonym of Rachis nigrilineata (Reeve, 1849) (incorrect grammatical agreement of specific epithet)
- Rachis onychinus (Heude, 1885): synonym of Sinorachis onychinus (Heude, 1885) (unaccepted combination
- Rachis petersi (Pfeiffer, 1855): synonym of Pleurorhachis petersi (L. Pfeiffer, 1855) (superseded combination)
- Rachis punctatus (Anton, 1838): synonym of Rachis punctata (Anton, 1838) (incorrect grammatical agreement of specific epithet)
- Rachis rorkorensis Kobelt, 1910: synonym of Rhachistia rorkorensis (Kobelt, 1910)
- Rachis succincta (E. von Martens, 1879): synonym of Rhachistia braunsii (E. von Martens, 1869) (junior synonym)
- Rachis turricula Preston, 1911: synonym of Gittenedouardia turricula (Preston, 1911) (original combination)
- Rachis venustus (Morelet, 1861): synonym of Rachis venusta (Morelet, 1861) (incorrect grammatical agreement of specific epithet)
- Rachis vesiculatus (Benson, 1859): synonym of Rhachistia vesiculata (Benson, 1859) (incorrect grammatical agreement of specific epithet)
- Rachis vicinus Preston, 1910: synonym of Rhachistia chiradzuluensis (E.A. Smith, 1899) (junior synonym)
- Rachis virginea Preston, 1911: synonym of Rhachistia chiradzuluensis var. virginea (Preston, 1911) (original combination)
