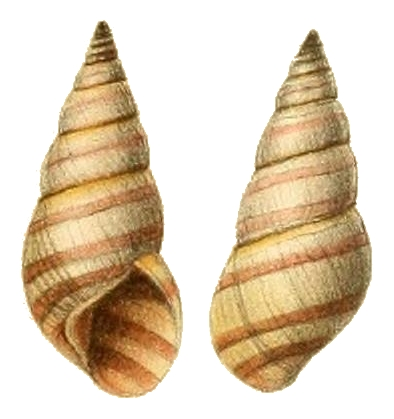
- Drawing of apertural and abapertural view of the shell of Rhachistia rhodotaenia.

Scientific classification
- Kingdom: Animalia
- Phylum: Mollusca
- Class: Gastropoda
- Order: Stylommatophora
- Infraorder: Pupilloidei
- Superfamily: Pupilloidea
- Family: Cerastidae
- Genus: Rhachistia; Connolly, 1922

Type species
- Buliminus (Rhachis) rhodotaenia E. von Martens, 1869

Synonyms
- Eorrhachis Tomlin & Peile, 1930; Rachispeculum Iredale, 1933; Rachistia (misspelling)

= Rhachistia =

Genus of gastropods

Rhachistia is a genus of air-breathing land snails, terrestrial pulmonate gastropod molluscs in the family Cerastidae.

The genus Rhachistia is found in Eastern Africa and Asia.

== Species ==
Species in the genus Rhachistia include:

- Rhachistia adumbratus (L. Pfeiffer, 1855)
- Rhachistia aldabrae (von Martens, 1898) - Aldabra banded snail - assumed extinct since 2000, small population found 2014
- Rhachistia bengalensis (Lamarck, 1822)
- Rhachistia boehmi (E. von Martens, 1895)
- Rhachistia braunsii (von Martens, 1869) (synonym: Rhachidina braunsi (von Martens, 1869))
- Rhachistia catenata (E. von Martens, 1860)
- Rhachistia chiradzuluensis (E.A. Smith, 1899)
- Rhachistia conformalis Sutcharit, Naggs & Panha, 2010
- Rhachistia dubiosa (Sturany, 1898)
- Rhachistia erlangeri (Kobelt, 1910)
- Rhachistia festiva (Connolly, 1925)
- Rhachistia ganalensis (Kobelt, 1910)
- Rhachistia hildebandti (von Martens, 1878)
- Rhachistia histrio (Pfeiffer, 1855)
- Rhachistia infracincta (Gould, 1850)
- Rhachistia lilacina Connolly, 1930
- Rhachistia melanacme (L. Pfeiffer, 1855)
- Rhachistia moluensis (Kobelt, 1910)
- Rhachistia mozambicensis (L. Pfeiffer, 1846)
- Rhachistia picturata (Morelet, 1889)
- Rhachistia praetermissa (W. T. Blanford & H. F. Blanford, 1861)
- Rhachistia pulchra (Gray, 1825)
- Rhachistia rhodotaenia (von Martens, 1901) - type species of the genus Rhachistia
- Rhachistia rochebruniana (Bourguignat, 1883)
- Rhachistia rorkorensis (Kobelt, 1910)
- Rhachistia sanguinea (Benson, 1857)
- Rhachistia spilogramma (E. von Martens, 1860)
- Rhachistia sticta (E. von Martens, 1860)
- Rhachistia sulphurea (Tomlin & Peile, 1930)
- Rhachistia trutta (W. T. Blanford, 1866)
- Rhachistia vesiculata (Benson, 1859)

Synonyms

- Rhachistia praetermissus (W. T. Blanford & H. F. Blanford, 1861): synonym of Rhachistia praetermissa (W. T. Blanford & H. F. Blanford, 1861) (incorrect gender ending)
- Rhachistia pulcher (Gray, 1825): synonym of Rhachistia pulchra (Gray, 1825) (incorrect gender ending)
- Rhachistia sanguineus (Benson, 1857): synonym of Rhachistia sanguinea (Benson, 1857) (incorrect grammatical agreement of specific epithet)
- Rhachistia vesiculatus (Benson, 1859): synonym of Rhachistia vesiculata (Benson, 1859) (incorrect grammatical agreement of specific epithet)
