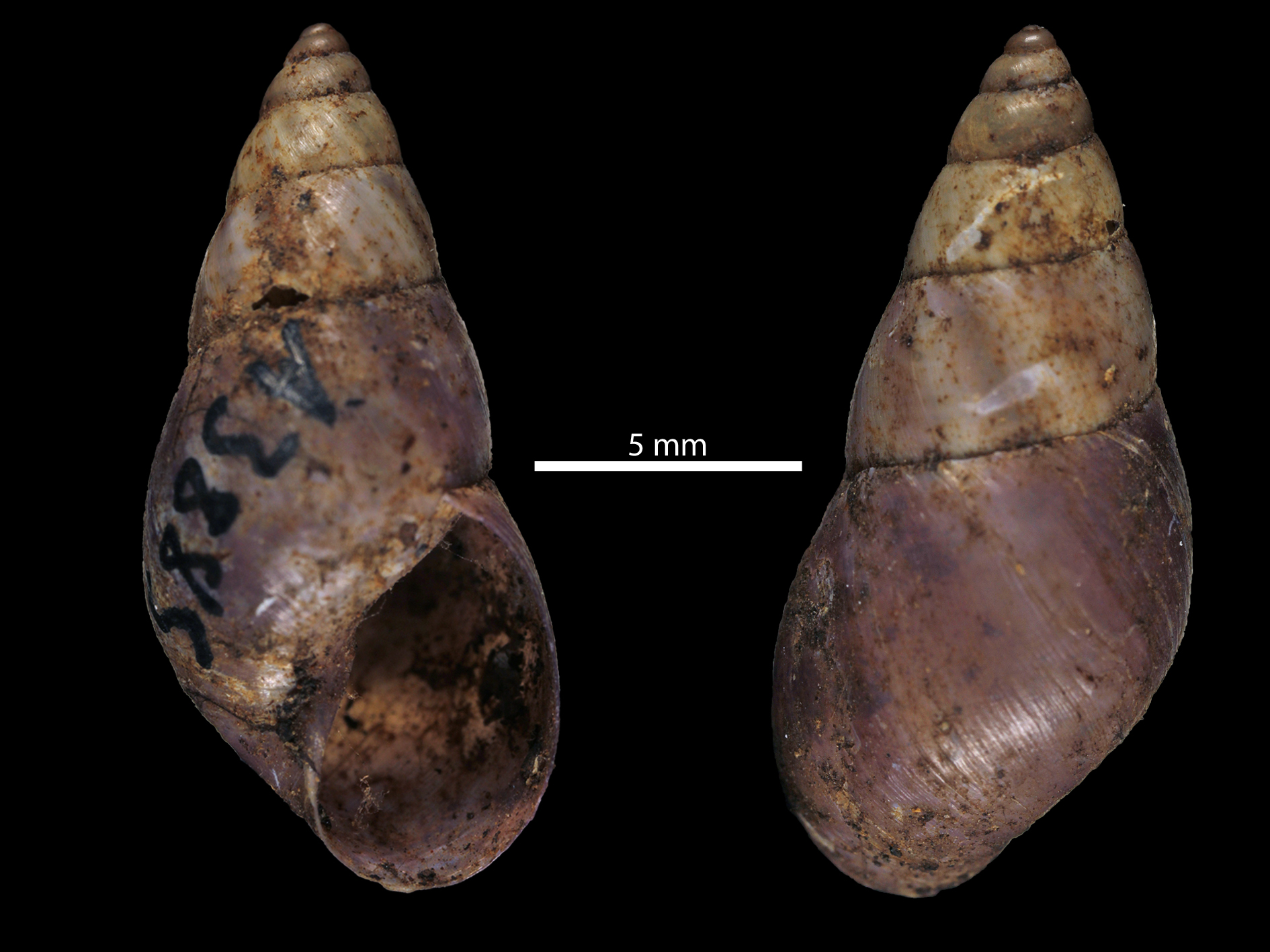
- Shell of Gittenedouardia randalanai (paratype at MNHN, Paris)

Scientific classification
- Domain: Eukaryota
- Kingdom: Animalia
- Phylum: Mollusca
- Class: Gastropoda
- Order: Stylommatophora
- Infraorder: Pupilloidei
- Superfamily: Pupilloidea
- Family: Cerastidae
- Genus: Gittenedouardia; Bank & Menkhorst, 2008

Type species
- Bulimus spadiceus L. Pfeiffer, 1846

= Gittenedouardia =

Genus of gastropods

Gittenedouardia is a genus of air-breathing land snails, terrestrial pulmonate gastropod mollusks in the family Cerastidae.

== Species ==
Species within the genus Gittenedouardia include:

- Gittenedouardia alycaeoides (Verdcourt, 1957)
- Gittenedouardia arenicola (Benson, 1856)
- Gittenedouardia athiensis (Connolly, 1925)
- Gittenedouardia burnayi (Dohrn, 1866)
- Gittenedouardia caffra (F. Krauss in L. Pfeiffer, 1848)
- Gittenedouardia carinifera (Melvill & Ponsonby, 1897)
- Gittenedouardia cockerelli (Pilsbry, 1933)
- Gittenedouardia conulina (E. von Martens, 1869)
- Gittenedouardia conulus (L. Reeve, 1849)
- Gittenedouardia dimera (Melvill & Ponsonby, 1901)
- Gittenedouardia drakensbergensis (E.A. Smith, 1877)
- Gittenedouardia eminula (Morelet, 1848)
- Gittenedouardia hanningtoni (G. B. Sowerby III, 1890)
- Gittenedouardia herbigrada (Pilsbry, 1919)
- Gittenedouardia junodi (Connolly, 1922)
- Gittenedouardia kaokoensis (Connolly, 1929)
- Gittenedouardia lourdeli (Bourguignat, 1889)
- Gittenedouardia maritzburgensis (Melvill & Ponsonby, 1893)
- Gittenedouardia mcbeaniana (Burnup, 1905)
- Gittenedouardia meridionalis (L. Pfeiffer, 1848)
- Gittenedouardia metula (E. von Martens, 1895) (synonym: Edouardia metula (E. von Martens, 1895))
- Gittenedouardia metuloides (E.A. Smith, 1899)
- Gittenedouardia nakuroensis (Dautzenberg, 1908)
- Gittenedouardia natalensis (F. Krauss in L. Pfeiffer, 1846)
- Gittenedouardia orbus (W. T. Blanford & H. F. Blanford, 1861)
- Gittenedouardia prestoni (Connolly, 1925)
- Gittenedouardia randalanai (Griffiths & Herbert, 2013)
- Gittenedouardia rufonigra (L. Reeve, 1849)
- Gittenedouardia sordidula (E. von Martens, 1897)
- Gittenedouardia spadicea (L. Pfeiffer, 1846)
- Gittenedouardia subeminula (Bourguignat, 1883)
- Gittenedouardia transvaalensis (Melvill & Ponsonby, 1893)
- Gittenedouardia tumida (J.S. Gibbons in J.W. Taylor, 1877)
- Gittenedouardia turricula (Preston, 1911)
- Gittenedouardia vesconis (Morelet, 1860)
