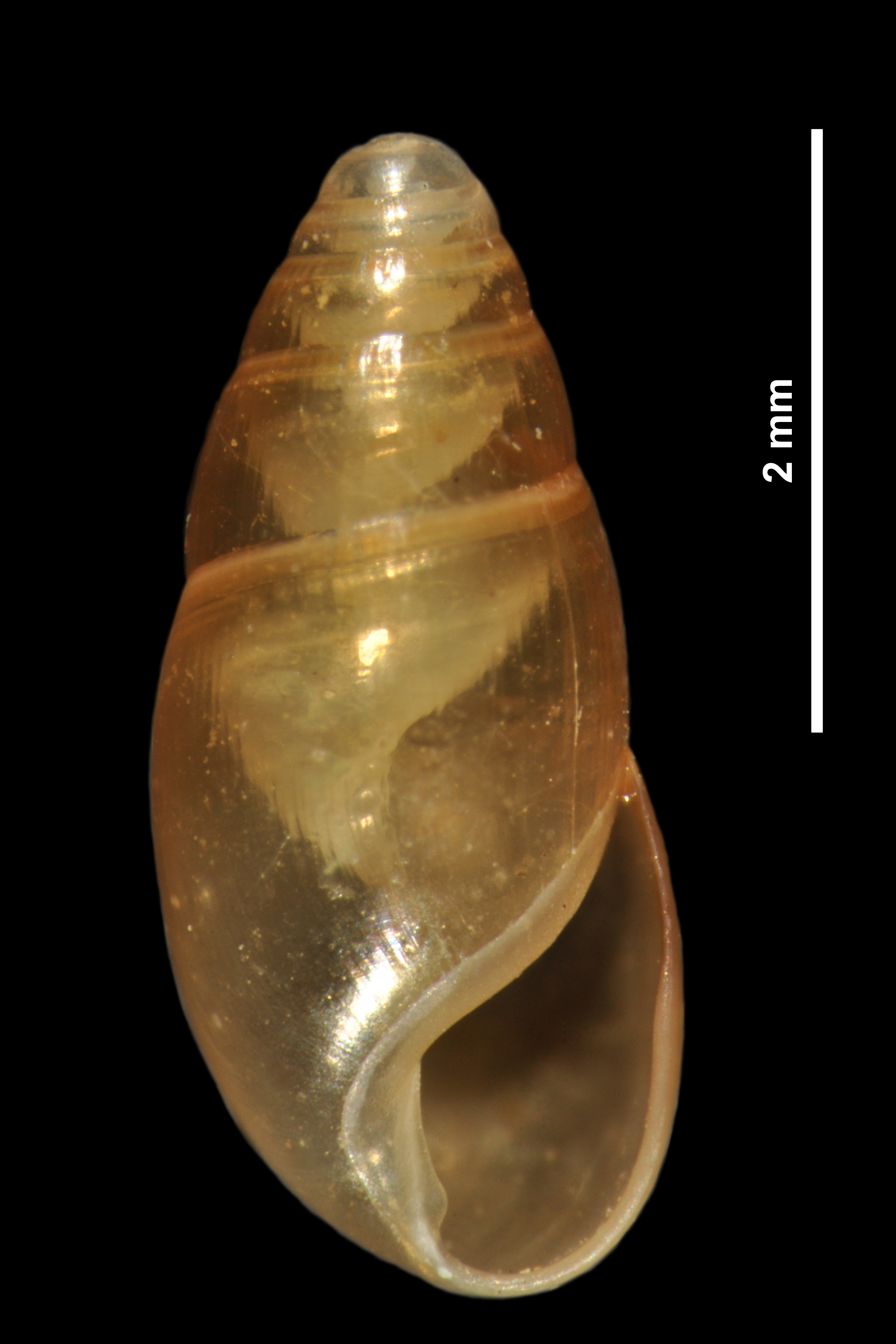
- Shell of Cryptazeca monodonta (specimen at MNHN, Paris)

Conservation status
- Endangered (IUCN 3.1)

Scientific classification
- Kingdom: Animalia
- Phylum: Mollusca
- Class: Gastropoda
- Order: Stylommatophora
- Family: Azecidae
- Genus: Cryptazeca
- Species: C. monodonta

Binomial name
- Cryptazeca monodonta (de Folin & Bérillon 1877)

= Cryptazeca monodonta =

Species of gastropod

Cryptazeca monodonta is a species of small, air-breathing land snail, a terrestrial pulmonate gastropod mollusc in the family Azecidae.

== Distribution ==
This species is found in France and Spain.
