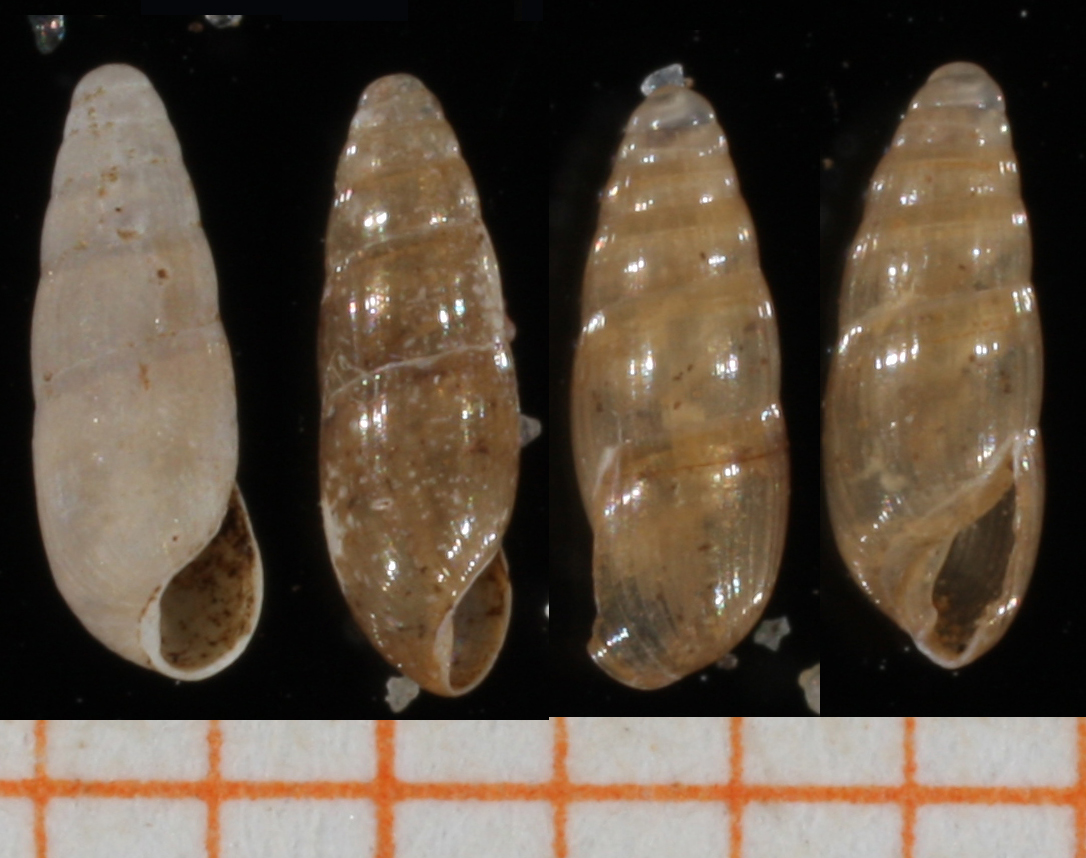
- Cryptazeca subcylindrica shells

Conservation status
- Least Concern (IUCN 3.1)

Scientific classification
- Kingdom: Animalia
- Phylum: Mollusca
- Class: Gastropoda
- Order: Stylommatophora
- Family: Azecidae
- Genus: Cryptazeca
- Species: C. subcylindrica

Binomial name
- Cryptazeca subcylindrica Folin & Bérillon, 1877

= Cryptazeca subcylindrica =

Species of gastropod

Cryptazeca subcylindrica is a species of gastropod in the family Azecidae. It is endemic to France.
