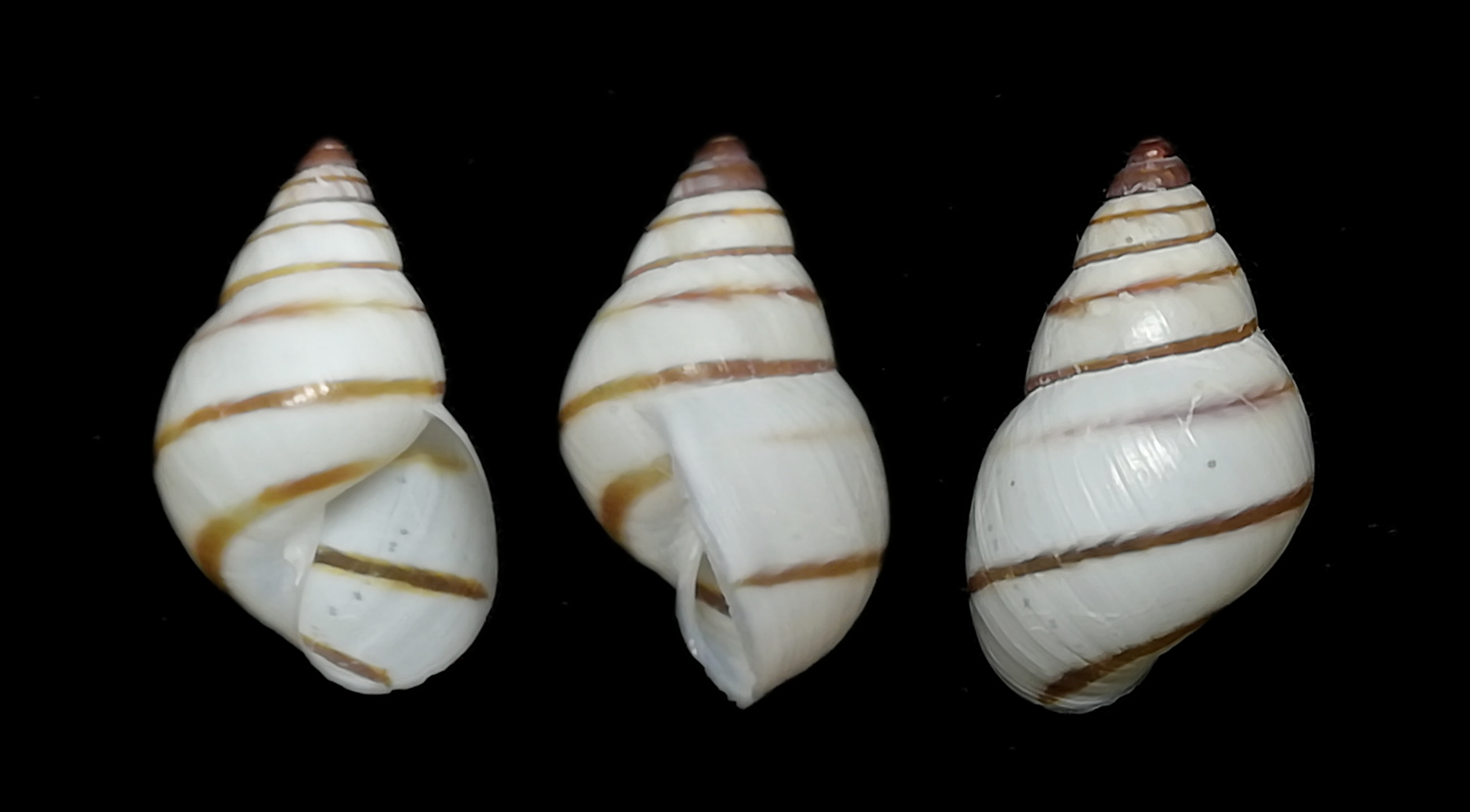

Scientific classification
- Kingdom: Animalia
- Phylum: Mollusca
- Class: Gastropoda
- Order: Stylommatophora
- Family: Cerastidae
- Genus: Rachis
- Species: R. tulearensis

Binomial name
- Rachis tulearensis (Fischer-Piette, 1964)

Synonyms
- Rhachis tulearensis Fischer-Piette, 1964

= Rachis tulearensis =

Species of gastropod

Rachis tulearensis is a species of conical air-breathing land snail, a gastropod mollusc in the family Cerastidae.

== Distribution ==
Madagascar.

== Etymology ==
This species is named after Tuléar, a city in Madagascar.
