= Cryptazeca elongata =

Conservation status
- Critically Endangered (IUCN 3.1)

Scientific classification
- Kingdom: Animalia
- Phylum: Mollusca
- Class: Gastropoda
- Order: Stylommatophora
- Family: Azecidae
- Genus: Cryptazeca
- Species: C. elongata

Binomial name
- Cryptazeca elongata Gomez, 1990

Species of gastropod

Cryptazeca elongata is a species of gastropod in the family Azecidae. It was first discovered in 1990 by BJ Gomez Moliner within a cave 2 kilometers northwest of the Covalanas Cave of Cantabria. The species was listed as critically endangered in 2015.
