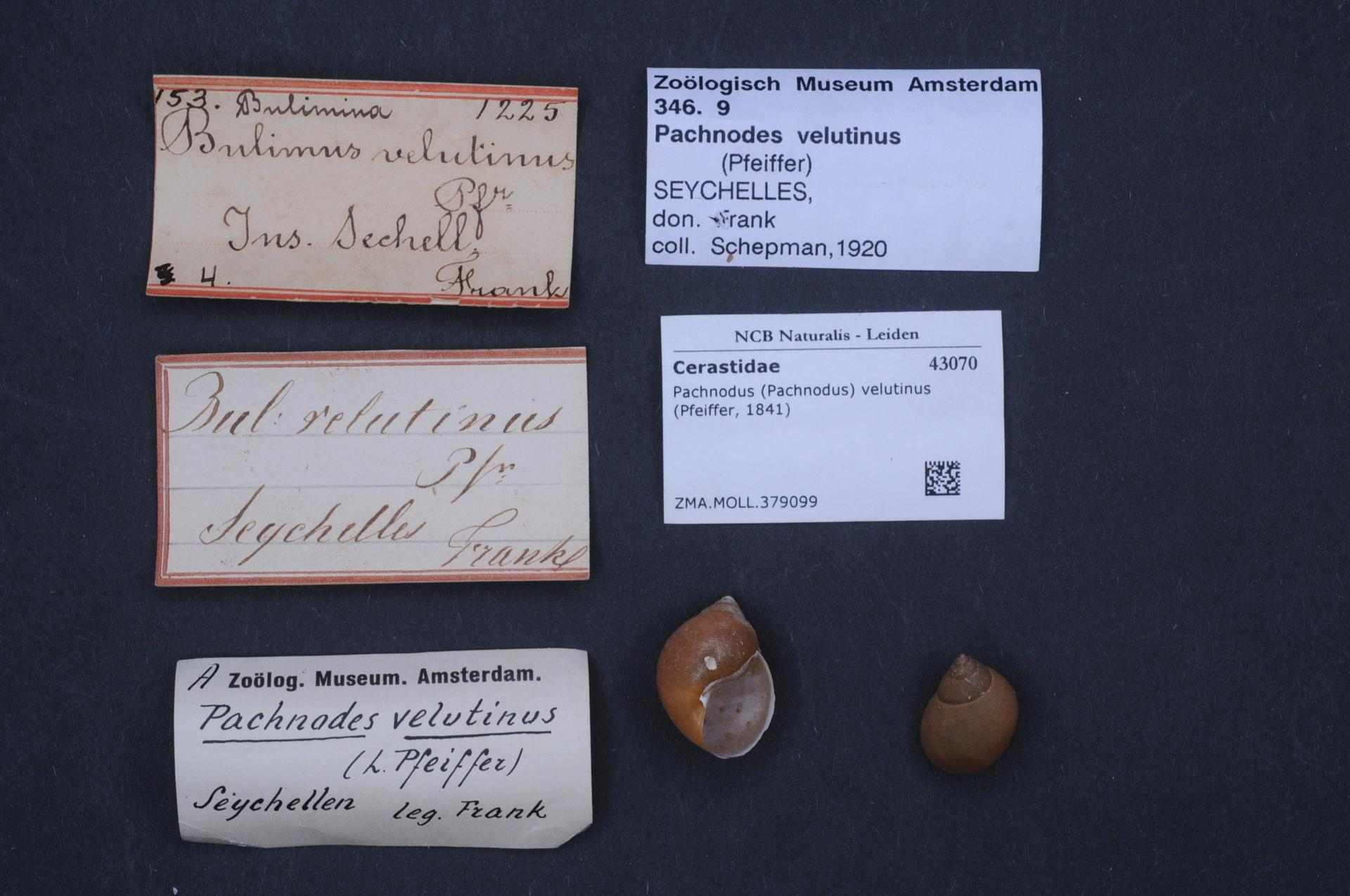
- Pachnodus velutinus shells

Conservation status
- Extinct (2000) (IUCN 3.1)

Scientific classification
- Kingdom: Animalia
- Phylum: Mollusca
- Class: Gastropoda
- Order: Stylommatophora
- Family: Cerastidae
- Genus: Pachnodus
- Species: †P. velutinus

Binomial name
- †Pachnodus velutinus (Pfeiffer, 1841)

= Pachnodus velutinus =

Species of gastropod

Pachnodus velutinus was a species of air-breathing land snail, a terrestrial pulmonate gastropod mollusk in the family Cerastidae. This species was endemic to the Seychelles. It is now extinct.

Hybridisation with Pachnodus niger caused the extinction. Hybrids Pachnodus niger × velutinus still exist.
