= Rhachistia catenata =

Scientific classification
- Kingdom: Animalia
- Phylum: Mollusca
- Class: Gastropoda
- Order: Stylommatophora
- Family: Cerastidae
- Genus: Rhachistia
- Species: R. catenata

Binomial name
- Rhachistia catenata (E. von Martens, 1860)

Synonyms
- Buliminus (Rhachis) braunsii

Species of gastropod

Rhachistia catenata is a species of air-breathing land snail, a pulmonate gastropod mollusk in the family Cerastidae. It was subsequently re-described as Buliminus (Rhachis) braunsii in 1869 when found in Zanzibar.

== Distribution ==
This species occurs in Africa. The type locality is contained in Mozambique.
