= Cryptazeca kobelti =

Conservation status
- Endangered (IUCN 2.3)

Scientific classification
- Kingdom: Animalia
- Phylum: Mollusca
- Class: Gastropoda
- Order: Stylommatophora
- Family: Azecidae
- Genus: Cryptazeca
- Species: C. kobelti

Binomial name
- Cryptazeca kobelti Gittenberger, 1983

Species of gastropod

Cryptazeca kobelti is a species of gastropod in the family Azecidae. It is endemic to Spain.
