= Cochlicopa nitens =

Conservation status
- Least Concern (IUCN 2.3)

- Secure (NatureServe)

Scientific classification
- Kingdom: Animalia
- Phylum: Mollusca
- Class: Gastropoda
- Order: Stylommatophora
- Family: Cochlicopidae
- Genus: Cochlicopa
- Species: C. nitens

Binomial name
- Cochlicopa nitens Gallenstein, 1848

Species of gastropod

Cochlicopa nitens is a species of small air-breathing land snail, a terrestrial pulmonate gastropod mollusk in the family Cochlicopidae.

== Distribution ==
This species is found in Armenia, Austria, Azerbaijan, Belarus, Bulgaria, the Czech Republic, Denmark, Estonia, Georgia, Germany, Hungary, Kazakhstan, Latvia, Lithuania, Moldova, the Netherlands, Poland, Romania, Russia, Serbia and Montenegro, Slovakia, Sweden, Switzerland, Turkmenistan, and the Ukraine.
