= Hill End Pit =

Nature reserve in North Hertfordshire

Coordinates: 51.9008°N 0.26017°W

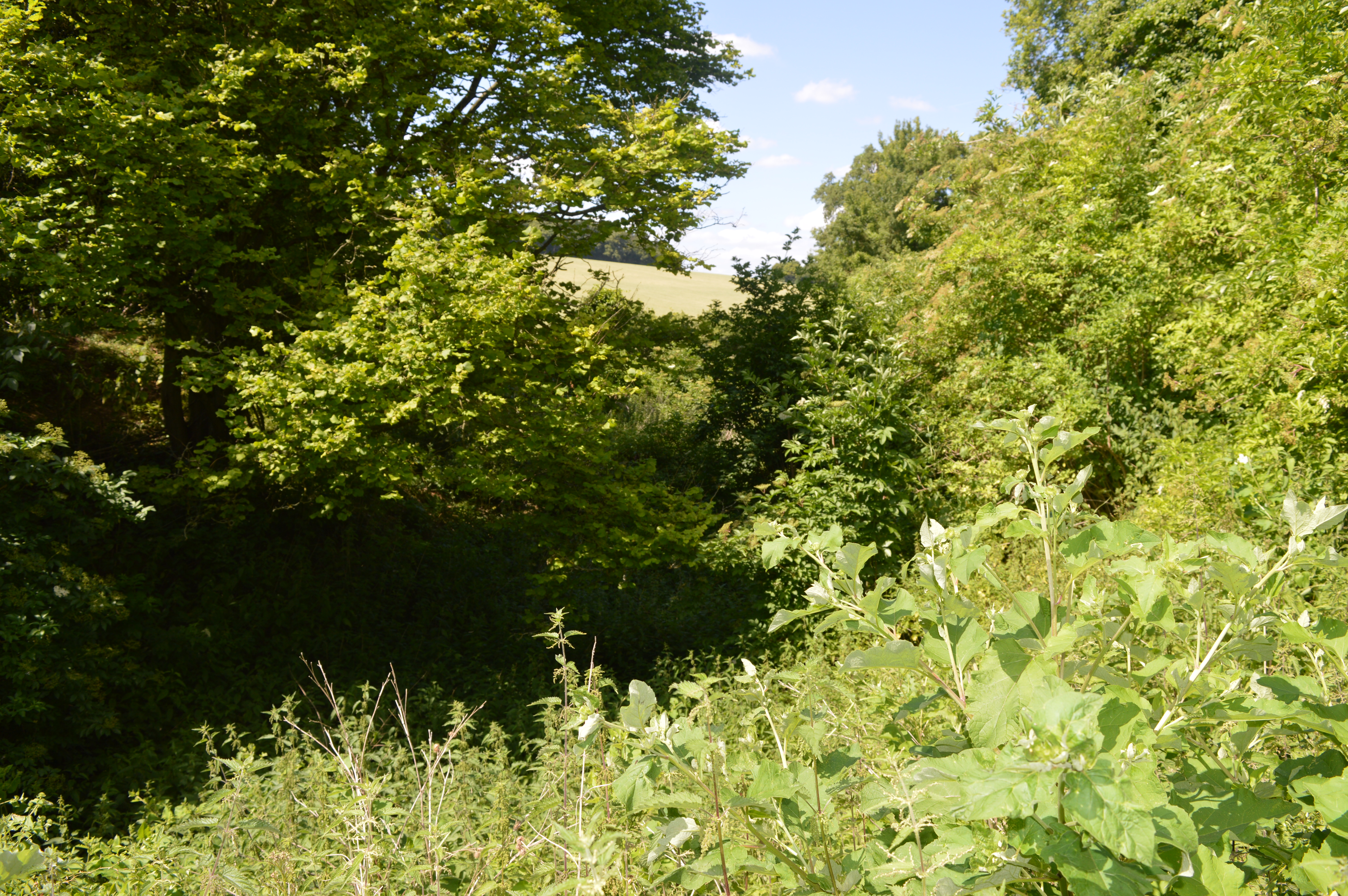

Hill End Pit (also called Hill End Farm Pit or Hitch Wood Pit) is a 0.7-hectare (1.7-acre) nature reserve on the site of a former chalk pit, in St Paul's Walden in North Hertfordshire. It was formerly managed by the Herts and Middlesex Wildlife Trust (HMWT). In February 2016 HMWT announced that three sites, Barkway Chalk Pit, Hill End Pit and Pryor's Wood, which HMWT managed on behalf of their owner, North Hertfordshire District Council, were to return to Council management as the Trust was no longer able to meet the cost. It has the largest colony of Azeca goodalli snails in Hertfordshire. Plants include viper's bugloss, cowslip and marjoram, there are butterflies such as common blue and gatekeeper, and many birds including woodpeckers.

The site is a Regionally important geological site (RIGS), dating to the Turonian age of the late Cretaceous around 90 million years ago, and was formerly a Site of Special Scientific Interest. According to A Geological Conservation Strategy for Hertfordshire, published by the Hertfordshire RIGS Group:

This pit is of national stratigraphic and international palaeontological importance, but has lost its original SSSI status and is now very degraded. It is the type locality of the Hitch Wood Hardground at the top of the Chalk Rock. This hardground is exceptionally fossiliferous here, and has probably yielded more fossils of all groups (notably ammonites) than any other Chalk Rock locality apart from the Kensworth Chalk Pit GCR site, Bedfordshire.

The site gives its name to the siliceous sponge genus Hillendia, and is the type locality of the genus, and two fossil ammonite species, Subprionocyclus hitchinensis and Subprionocyclus branneri have been described from this site after being discovered there.

It is shown on the Natural England Magic map as one of the "Geological places to visit".

The site is located off a track leading from Hitchwood Lane to Hill End Farm Lane. It is difficult to find, but the site noticeboard is visible through a gap in the hedge on the left hand side of the track.
