= Cryptazeca spelaea =

Conservation status
- Near Threatened (IUCN 3.1)

Scientific classification
- Kingdom: Animalia
- Phylum: Mollusca
- Class: Gastropoda
- Order: Stylommatophora
- Family: Azecidae
- Genus: Cryptazeca
- Species: C. spelaea

Binomial name
- Cryptazeca spelaea Gomez, 1990

Species of gastropod

Cryptazeca spelaea is a species of gastropod in the family Azecidae. It is endemic to Spain.
