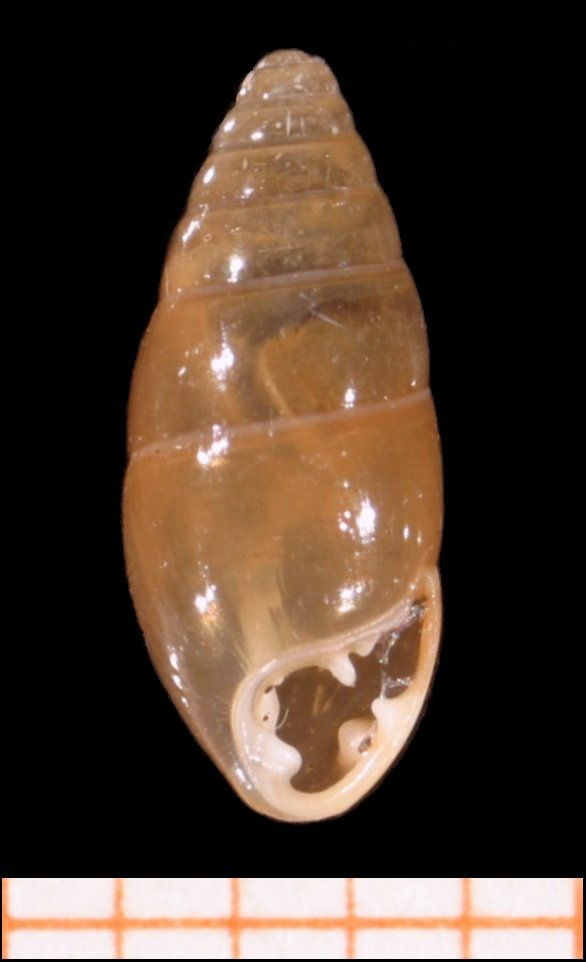

Scientific classification
- Domain: Eukaryota
- Kingdom: Animalia
- Phylum: Mollusca
- Class: Gastropoda
- Order: Stylommatophora
- Family: Azecidae
- Genus: Azeca
- Species: A. goodalli

Binomial name
- Azeca goodalli (Férussac, 1821)

Synonyms
- Azeca tridens (Pulteney, 1799) (Original name suppressed by Opinion 335); Turbo tridens Pulteney, 1799; Helix (Cochlodonta) goodalli Férussac, 1821

= Azeca goodalli =

Species of gastropod

Azeca goodalli is a species of small air-breathing land snail, a terrestrial pulmonate gastropod mollusk in the family Cochlicopidae.

This is the only still existent species in the genus Azeca.

== Distribution ==
This species is known to occur in a number of countries and islands in Western Europe to Central Europe, including:

- Great Britain
- Other areas
