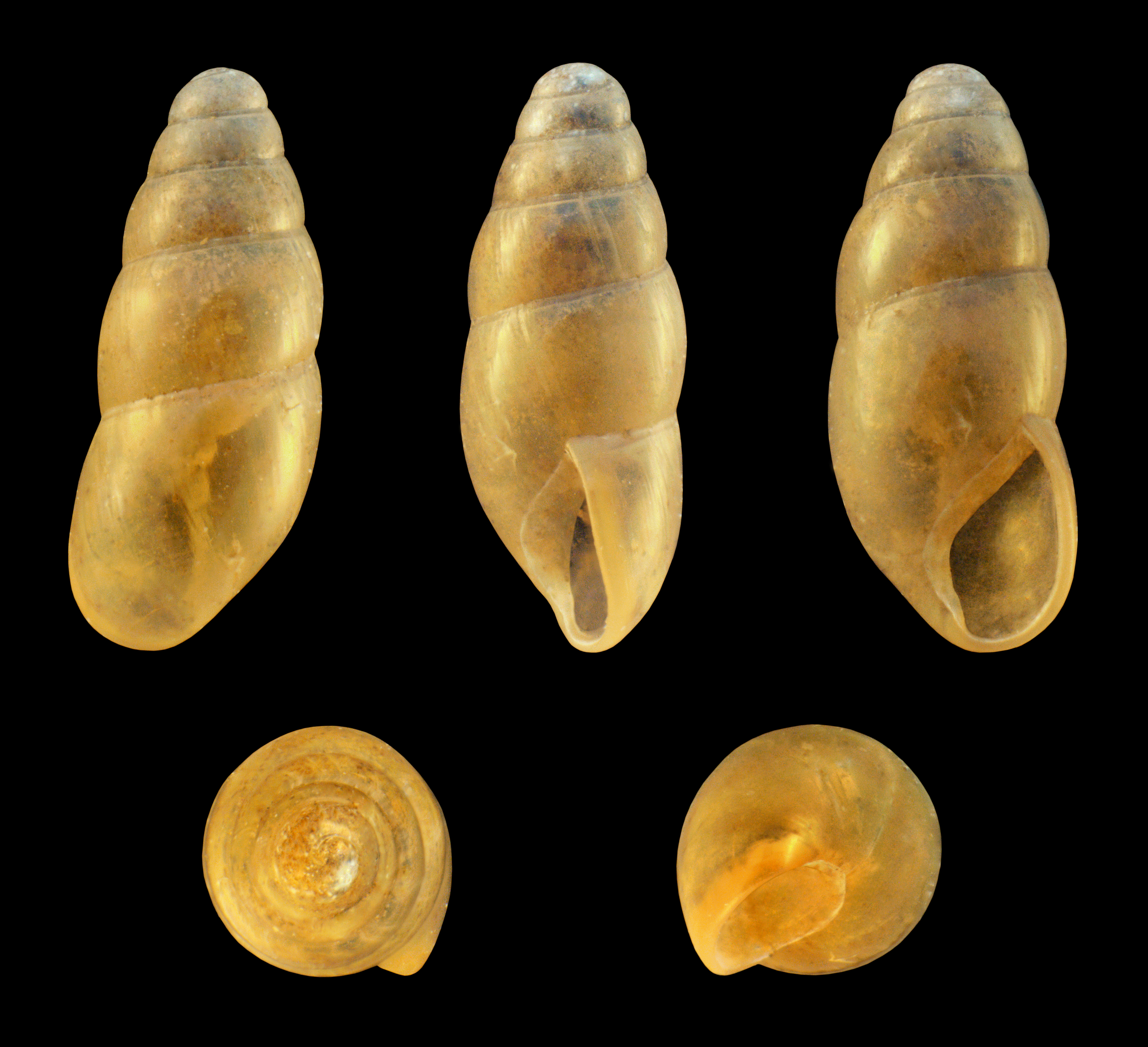

Conservation status
- Secure (NatureServe)

Scientific classification
- Kingdom: Animalia
- Phylum: Mollusca
- Class: Gastropoda
- Order: Stylommatophora
- Family: Cochlicopidae
- Genus: Cochlicopa
- Species: C. lubricella

Binomial name
- Cochlicopa lubricella (Rossmässler, 1835)

Synonyms
- Bulimus lubricus var. lubricella Porro, 1838; Zua lubrica f. lacteola Lindholm, 1911 (a junior synonym)

= Cochlicopa lubricella =

Species of gastropod

Cochlicopa lubricella is a European species of small air-breathing land snail, a terrestrial pulmonate gastropod mollusk in the family Cochlicopidae.

This species is closely related to Cochlicopa lubrica, but the shell is narrower in proportion.

== Distribution ==
Distribution of Cochlicopa lubricella include:

- Czech Republic
- Netherlands
- Slovakia
- Ukraine
- Great Britain
- Ireland
