= Cryptazeca vasconica =

Conservation status
- Near Threatened (IUCN 2.3)

Scientific classification
- Kingdom: Animalia
- Phylum: Mollusca
- Class: Gastropoda
- Order: Stylommatophora
- Family: Azecidae
- Genus: Cryptazeca
- Species: C. vasconica

Binomial name
- Cryptazeca vasconica Kobelt, 1884

Species of gastropod

Cryptazeca vasconica is a species of gastropod in the family Azecidae. It is endemic to Spain.
