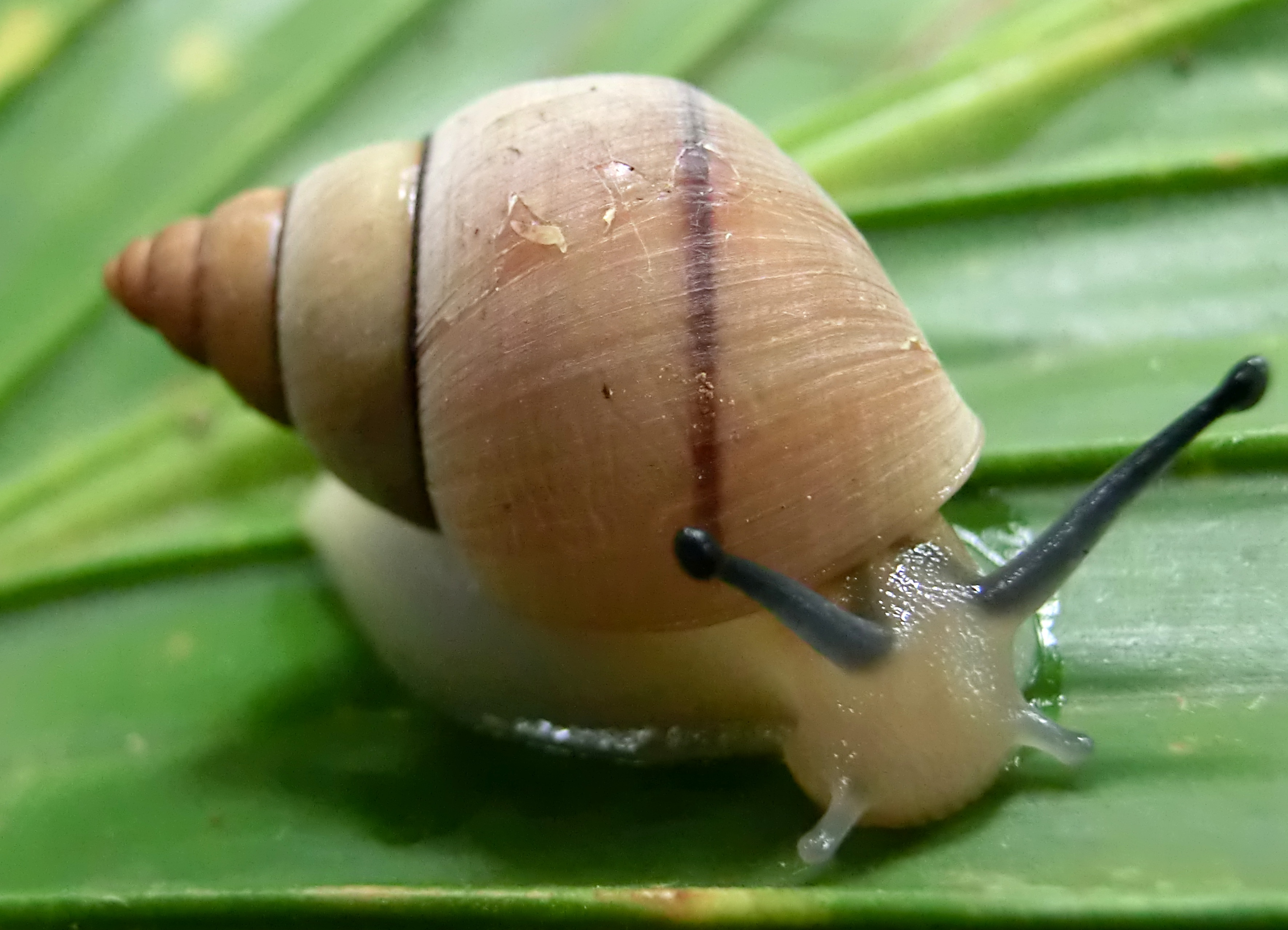
- Pachnodus praslinus
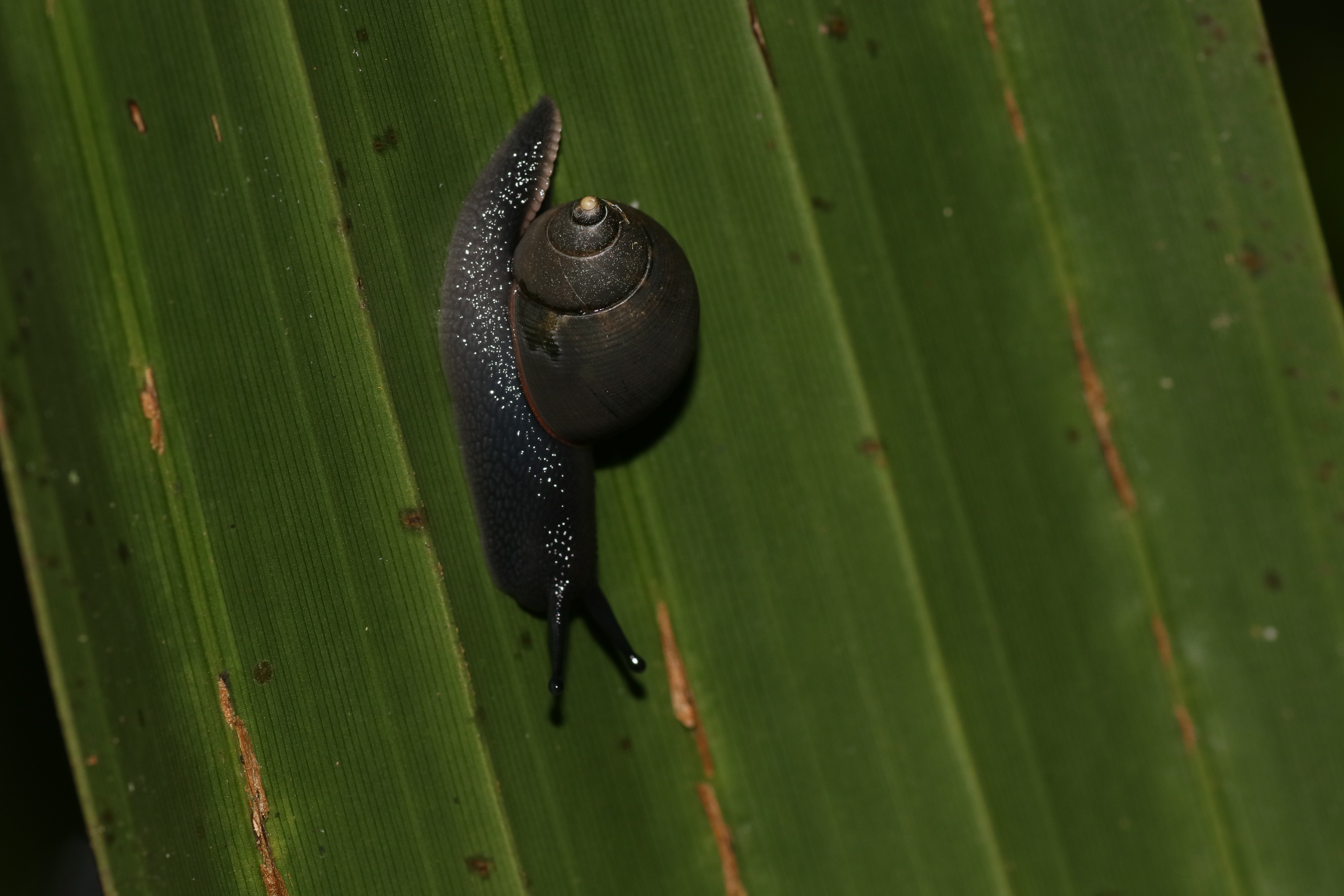
- Pachnodus niger

Scientific classification
- Domain: Eukaryota
- Kingdom: Animalia
- Phylum: Mollusca
- Class: Gastropoda
- Order: Stylommatophora
- Infraorder: Pupilloidei
- Superfamily: Pupilloidea
- Family: Cerastidae
- Genus: Pachnodus; Martens, 1860

= Pachnodus =

Genus of gastropods

Pachnodus is a genus of air-breathing land snails, terrestrial pulmonate gastropod mollusks in the family Cerastidae.

== Distribution ==
The genus Pachnodus is endemic to the Seychelles.

== Species ==
Species within the genus Pachnodus include:

subgenus Pachnodus

- Pachnodus becketti Gerlach, 1994
- Pachnodus leroyi Bourguignat, 1890
- Pachnodus lionneti Von Mol & Coppois, 1980
- Pachnodus niger (Dufo, 1840)
  - Pachnodus niger niger (Dufo, 1840)
  - Pachnodus niger subfuscus Gerlach, 1994
- † Pachnodus velutinus (Pfeiffer, 1942)
- Pachnodus niger × velutinus
- Pachnodus sesamorum Bourguignat, 1890

subgenus Nesiocerastus

- Pachnodus fregatensis Von Mol & Coppois, 1980
- Pachnodus kantilali Von Mol & Coppois, 1980
- Pachnodus ornatus (Dufo, 1840)
- Pachnodus ornatus var. biornatus
- Pachnodus oxoniensis Gerlach, 1994
- Pachnodus praslinus Gerlach, 1990
- Pachnodus silbouettanus Von Mol & Coppois, 1980
