= Dendropupoidea =

Scientific classification
- Kingdom: Animalia
- Phylum: Mollusca
- Class: Gastropoda
- Order: Stylommatophora
- Suborder: Helicina
- Infraorder: Pupilloidei
- Superfamily: †Dendropupoidea; Wenz, 1938

Families
- See text

Extinct superfamily of gastropods

Dendropupoidea is an extinct superfamily of fossil land snails in the clade Caenogastropoda.

== Taxonomy ==
Families within the superfamily Dendropupoidea include:

- † Family Dendropupidae
- † Family Anthracopupidae
