= Azecoidea =

Scientific classification
- Kingdom: Animalia
- Phylum: Mollusca
- Class: Gastropoda
- Order: Stylommatophora
- Suborder: Helicina
- Infraorder: Pupilloidei
- Superfamily: Azecoidea; H. Watson, 1920

Superfamily of gastropods

Azecoidea is a superfamily of small and very small air-breathing land snails, terrestrial gastropod mollusks in the infraorder Pupilloidei.

== Families ==
- Azecidae H. Watson, 1920
  - Subfamily Cryptazecinae Schileyko, 1999: synonym of Azecidae H. Watson, 1920
