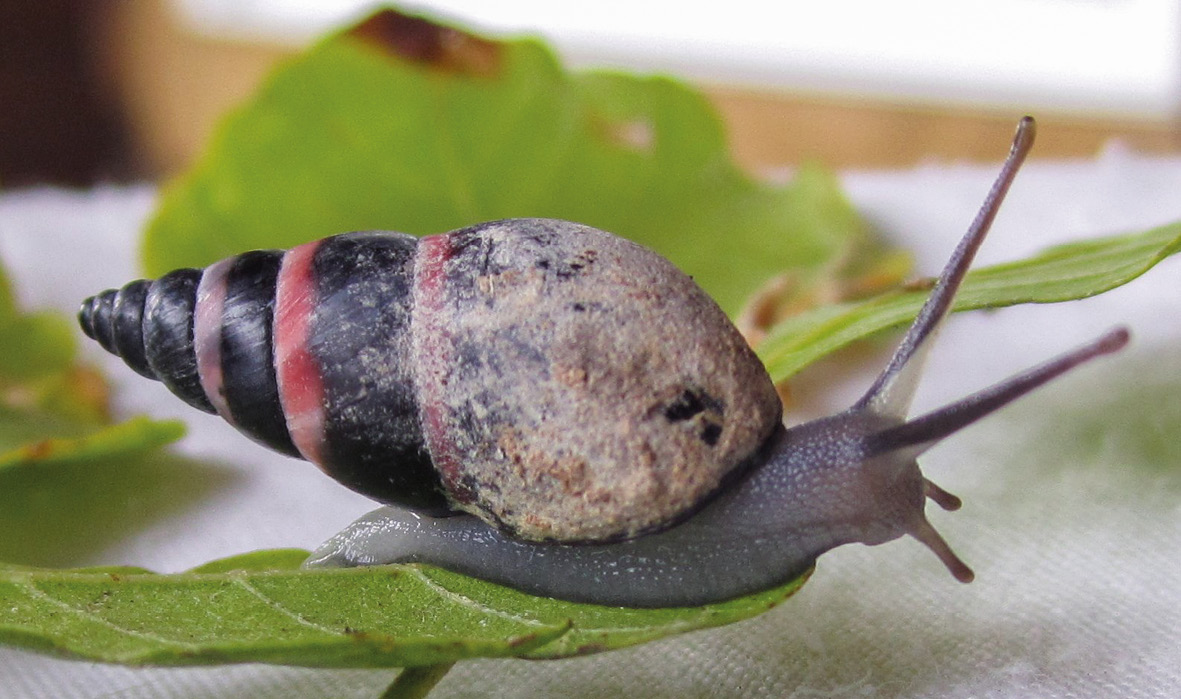

Conservation status
- Critically Endangered (IUCN 3.1)

Scientific classification
- Kingdom: Animalia
- Phylum: Mollusca
- Class: Gastropoda
- Order: Stylommatophora
- Family: Cerastidae
- Genus: Rhachistia
- Species: R. aldabrae

Binomial name
- Rhachistia aldabrae (von Martens, 1898)

Synonyms
- Buliminus (Rhachis) aldabrae von Martens, 1898; Rachis aldabrae

= Rhachistia aldabrae =

Species of gastropod

Rhachistia aldabrae, the Aldabra banded snail, is a species of air-breathing land snail, a pulmonate gastropod mollusc in the family Cerastidae. The species lives on one atoll in the Seychelles Islands, Indian Ocean, and is easily recognizable for its purplish-blue banded shell. The species was thought to have died out because of climate change, but was rediscovered in 2014.

The original 1898 type description of Rhachistia aldabrae in German language by Eduard von Martens.

== Description ==
The shell of this snail is very unusual in its coloring: purple, indigo blue, and orange, and this makes the snail very easy to recognize and identify. The Aldabra snail grazes on algae, and thus it is very low on the food chain.

The shell of this species is oblong, ovate-conical, rather thick, slightly striated, glossy, in the upper part is pale, in the lower part it is black brown. The shell has seven slightly curved and regularly increasing whorls. The upper 3-4 whorls are blackish, the following are dim bluish.

== Distribution ==
The Aldabra banded snail is endemic to Aldabra Atoll in the Indian Ocean. In 1906 it was the most common snail species on the atoll.

After 1976 however, only adult snails were found on Aldabra, and no live individuals had been found at all between 1997 and August 2014. Researchers had believed that this species became extinct during the late 1990s, after a series of unusually long, hot, and dry summers caused by climate change. These summers appear to have killed off a large number of the younger snails.

== Cause of apparent extinction ==
The habitat of this snail suffered a sudden decline in rainfall in the 1990s, which was essential to the survival of this species, and this dryness appeared to have caused its extinction. Living snails were discovered on 23 August 2014.

== Rediscovery ==
A number of specimens of the snail were discovered on August 23, 2014. A team of Seychelles Islands Foundation (SIF) staff were exploring infrequently visited parts of Malabar Island, the second largest island of Aldabra, when the snails were found. Dr Frauke Fleischer-Dogley, CEO of the CIF, commented:

The re-discovery of the Aldabra banded snail provides a beacon of hope. Despite major global environmental threats like climate change, this discovery shows that investments into protecting unique island biodiversity are well-placed. This snail provides hope for other island species, of which we have already lost too many. I hope that those of the international community, who are meeting at the Third International Conference on Small Island Developing States, take note that their investment is needed to generate such success. Nature has a resilience that may surprise us.
