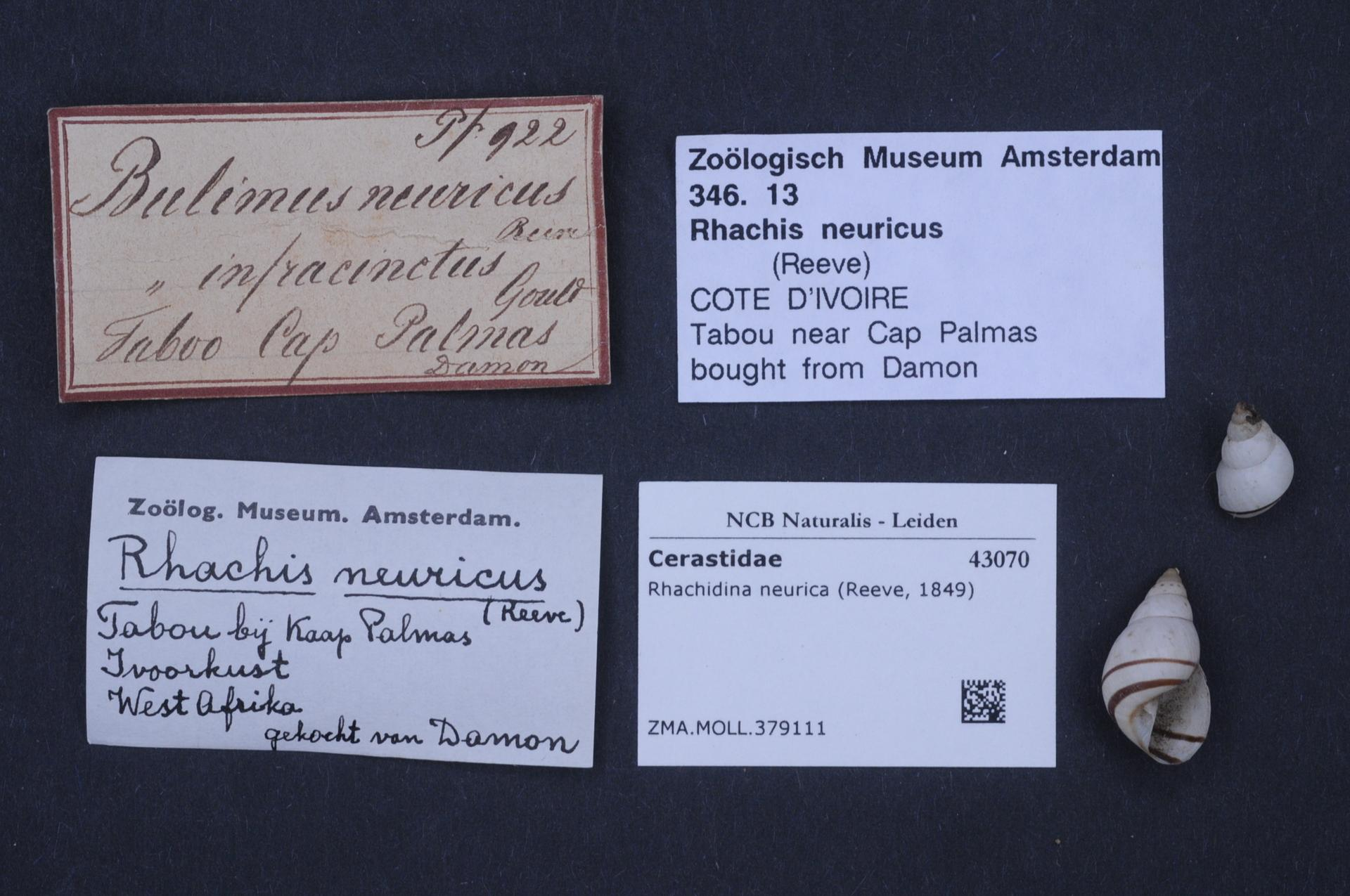
- Rhachidina neurica

Scientific classification
- Kingdom: Animalia
- Phylum: Mollusca
- Class: Gastropoda
- Order: Stylommatophora
- Family: Cerastidae
- Genus: Rhachidina; Thiele, 1911

= Rhachidina =

Genus of land snails

Rhachidina is a genus of gastropods belonging to the family Cerastidae.

The species of this genus are found in Central Africa and Australia.

Species:

- Rhachidina hieroglyphica (Preston, 1910)
- Rhachidina usagarica (Smith, 1890)
