= Pryor's Wood =

Nature reserve in Great Ashby, Hertfordshire, England

Coordinates: 51.9218°N 0.16338°W

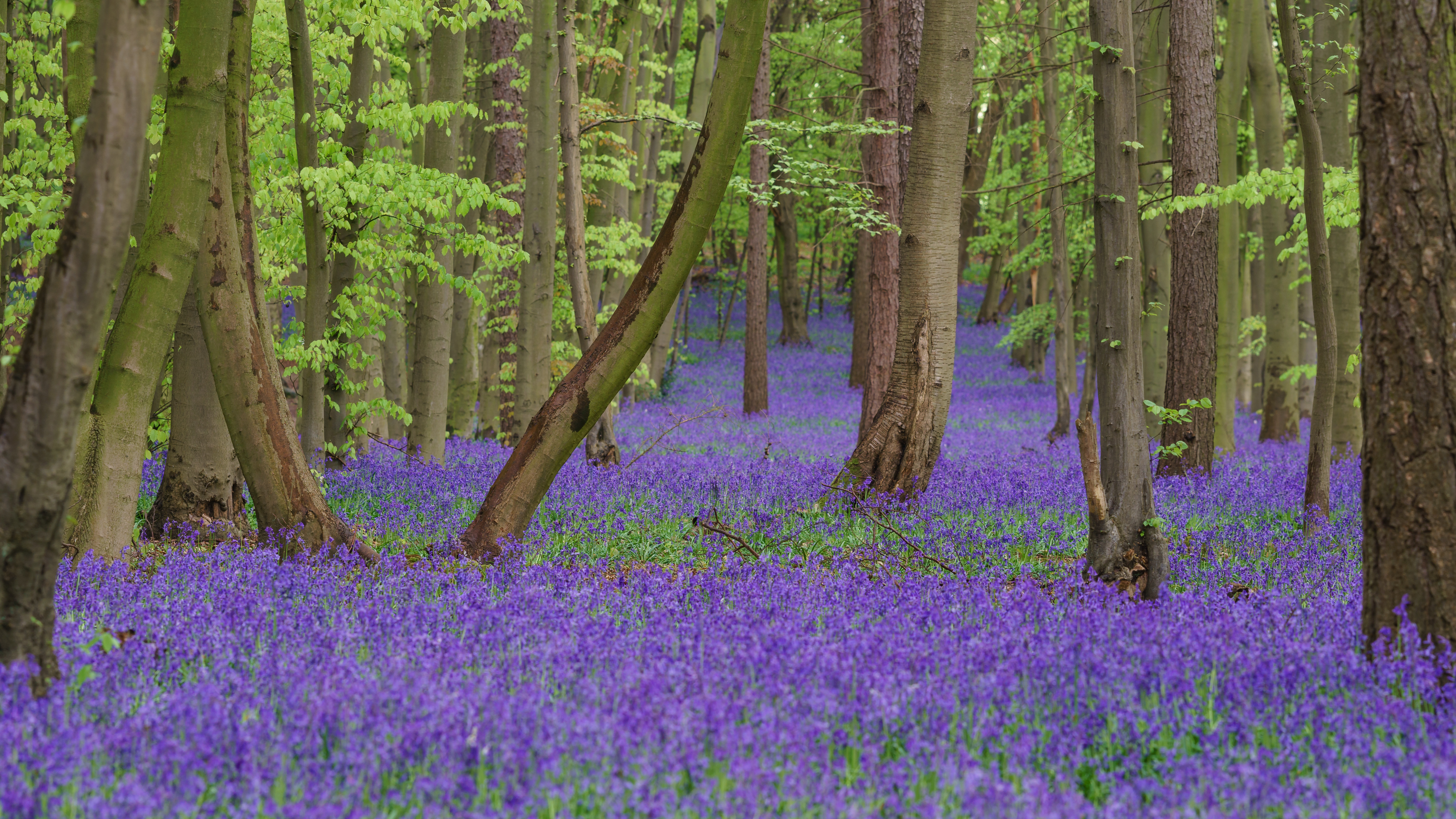
Bluebells in Pryor's Wood

Pryor's Wood is an 8.7-hectare (21-acre) nature reserve in Great Ashby, near Stevenage in Hertfordshire. It was formerly managed by the Herts and Middlesex Wildlife Trust (HMWT). In February 2016 HMWT announced that three sites, Barkway Chalk Pit, Hill End Pit and Pryor's Wood, which HMWT managed on behalf of their owner, North Hertfordshire District Council, were to return to Council management as the Trust was no longer able to meet the cost.

The site is mainly oak woodland but in some areas there is hazel coppice and hornbeam, with ground flora of bluebells and dog's mercury. There are many muntjac and fallow deer, and birds include sparrow hawks.

There is access from Gresley Way and Great Ashby District Park.
