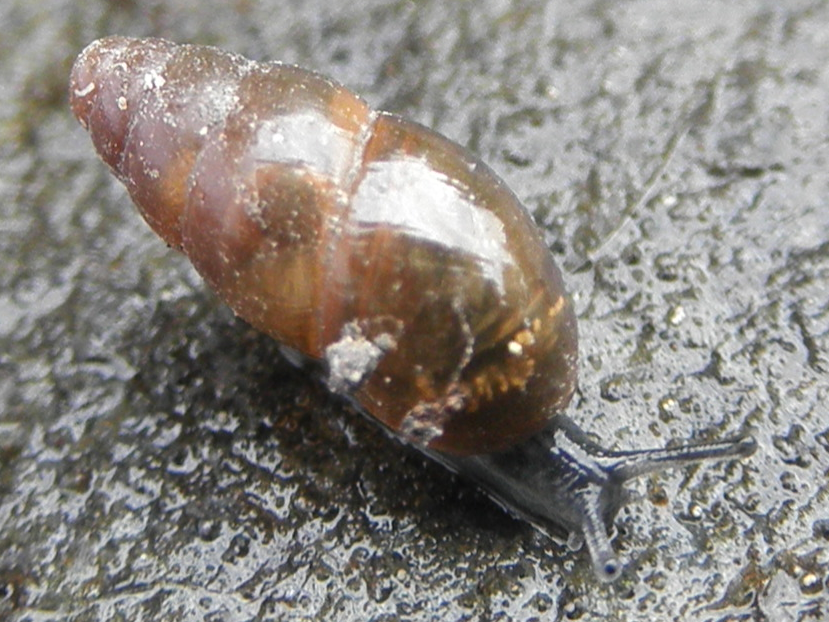
- Cochlicopa lubrica

Scientific classification
- Kingdom: Animalia
- Phylum: Mollusca
- Class: Gastropoda
- Order: Stylommatophora
- Family: Cochlicopidae
- Genus: Cochlicopa; Férussac, 1821

Synonyms
- Cionella Jeffreys, 1830; Cionella Jeffreys, 1830 (junior objective synonym); Cionella (Zua) Turton, 1831; Cochlicopa (Sinizua) Starobogatov, 1996 (a junior synonym); Ferussacia (Folliculus) Charpentier, 1837; Folliculus Charpentier, 1837; Helix (Cochlicopa) A. Férussac, 1821 (original rank); Hydastes Parreyss, 1849; Sinizua Starobogatov, 1996; Zua W. Turton, 1831

= Cochlicopa =

Genus of gastropods

Cochlicopa, whose species are known as pillar snails, is a genus of small air-breathing land snails, terrestrial pulmonate gastropod mollusks in the family Cochlicopidae.

This genus is prevalent in the Northern Hemisphere across the United States, Mexico and Europe. These snails feed mostly on plant matter, detritus and fungi.

== Species ==
Species in the genus Cochlicopa include:

- † Cochlicopa allixi (Cossmann, 1907)
- † Cochlicopa aurelianensis (Deshayes, 1863)
- † Cochlicopa brevis (Michaud, 1862)
- Cochlicopa davidis (Ancey, 1882)
- † Cochlicopa dormitzeri (Reuss in Reuss & Meyer, 1849)
- † Cochlicopa fassabortoloi Harzhauser, Neubauer & Esu in Harzhauser et al., 2015
- † Cochlicopa formicina (F. Sandberger, 1871)
- Cochlicopa hachijoensis Pilsbry, 1902
- † Cochlicopa headonensis Newton & G. F. Harris, 1894
- † Cochlicopa laevissima (Michaud, 1862)
- Cochlicopa lubrica (O. F. Müller, 1774) - glossy pillar
- Cochlicopa lubricella (Porro, 1838) - thin pillar
- † Cochlicopa macrostoma (O. Boettger, 1875)
- † Cochlicopa milleri Wenz, 1919
- Cochlicopa morseana Doherty 1878 - Appalachian pillar
- Cochlicopa nitens (M. von Gallenstein, 1848) - robust pillar
- † Cochlicopa procera Gottschick, 1920
- Cochlicopa sinensis (Heude, 1890)
- † Cochlicopa splendens (A. Braun in Walchner, 1851)
- † Cochlicopa subcylindroides (Paladilhe, 1873)

Species brought into synonymy

- † Cochlicopa loxostoma (Klein, 1853): synonym of † Hypnophila loxostoma (Klein, 1853) (new combination)
- Cochlicopa repentina Hudec, 1960: synonym of Cochlicopa lubrica (O. F. Müller, 1774)
- † Cochlicopa subrimata (Reuss in Reuss & Meyer, 1849) : synonym of † Hypnophila subrimata (Reuss in Reuss & Meyer, 1849) † (new combination)
