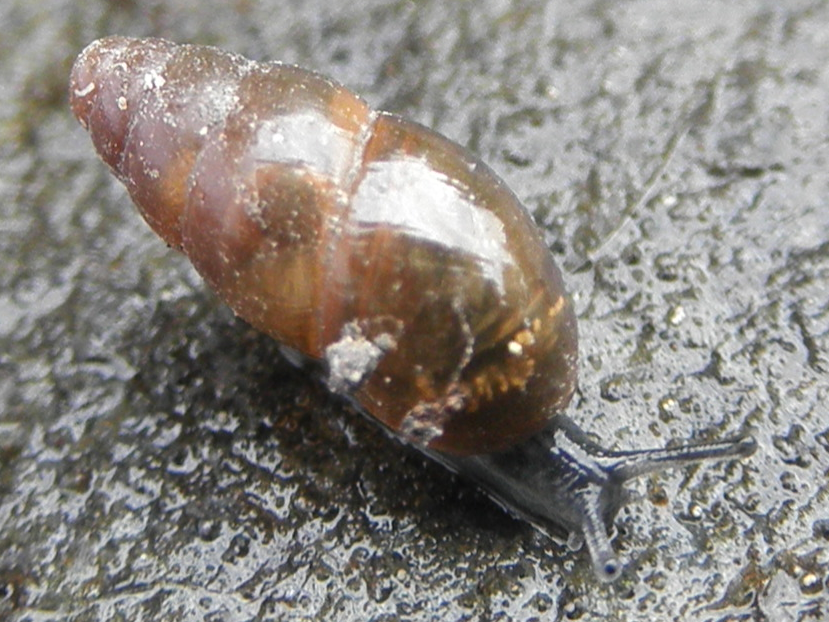
- A live Cochlicopa lubrica

Conservation status
- Secure (NatureServe)

Scientific classification
- Kingdom: Animalia
- Phylum: Mollusca
- Class: Gastropoda
- Order: Stylommatophora
- Family: Cochlicopidae
- Genus: Cochlicopa
- Species: C. lubrica

Binomial name
- Cochlicopa lubrica (O. F. Müller, 1774)

Synonyms
- Achatina minima Siemaschko, 1847; Bulimus lubricoides Stimpson, 1851; Bulimus lubricus (O. F. Müller, 1774); Cionella lubrica (O. F. Müller, 1774); Cochlicopa repentina Hudec, 1960; Helix lubrica O. F. Müller, 1774; Helix lubricus O. F. Müller, 1774; Helix stagnorum Gmelin, 1791 sensu Pulteney, 1799 (misapplication); Physa aenigma Westerlund, 1877 (a junior synonym); Turbo glaber da Costa, 1778; Zua buddii Dupuy, 1849; Zua locardi Pollonera, 1885; Zua lubrica (O.F. Müller, 1774) (new combination)

= Cochlicopa lubrica =

Species of gastropod

Cochlicopa lubrica is a species of small air-breathing land snail, a terrestrial pulmonate gastropod mollusk in the family Cochlicopidae.

== Description ==
The 5–7.5 x 2.4–2.9 mm shell has 4–5 moderately convex whorls. The aperture inside is slightly thickened. There are no apertural teeth and there is no umbilicus. Shell colour is horny yellowish to reddish brown. The animal is greyish or blackish, with dark tentacles.

This species can be hard to differentiate from the similar species Cochlicopa lubricella.

== Taxonomy ==
Cochlicopa repentina Hudec, 1960 has been evaluated as a form of Cochlicopa lubrica in 1994.

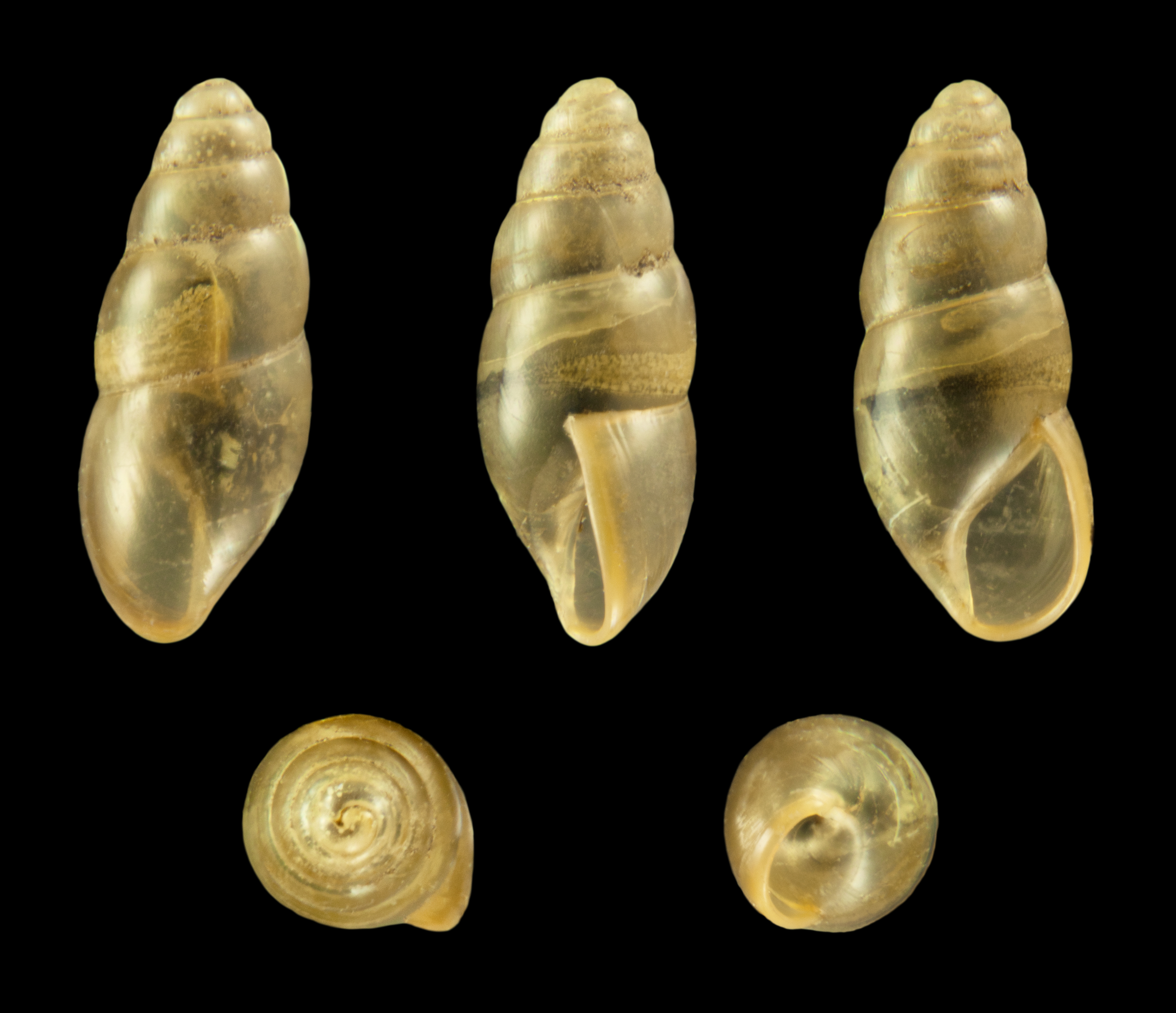
Shell of Cochlicopa lubrica

== Distribution ==
This species occurs in countries and islands including:

- Czech Republic
- Netherlands
- Poland
- Slovakia
- Ukraine
- Spain
- Great Britain
- Ireland
- Hungary
- Croatia

== Other sources ==
- Barker, G. M. (1999). Naturalised terrestrial Stylommatophora (Mollusca: Gastropoda). Fauna of New Zealand 38: 1-254
- Spencer, H.G., Marshall, B.A. & Willan, R.C. (2009). Checklist of New Zealand living Mollusca. pp 196–219 in Gordon, D.P. (ed.) New Zealand inventory of biodiversity. Volume one. Kingdom Animalia: Radiata, Lophotrochozoa, Deuterostomia. Canterbury University Press, Christchurch
- Herbert, D.G. (2010). The introduced terrestrial Mollusca of South Africa. SANBI Biodiversity Series, 15: vi + 108 pp. Pretoria
- Kerney, M.P., Cameron, R.A.D. & Jungbluth, J-H. (1983). Die Landschnecken Nord- und Mitteleuropas. Ein Bestimmungsbuch für Biologen und Naturfreunde, 384 pp., 24 plates. [Summer or later]. Hamburg / Berlin (Paul Parey).
- Sysoev, A. V. & Schileyko, A. A. (2009). Land snails and slugs of Russia and adjacent countries. Sofia/Moskva (Pensoft). 312 pp., 142 plates
- Yen, T.-C. (1939). Die chinesischen Land- und Süßwasser-Gastropoden des Natur-Museums Senckenberg. Abhandlungen der Senckenbergischen Naturforschenden Gesellschaft, 444: 1-233, pl. 1-16. Frankfurt am Main.
- Minato, H. (1988). A systematic and bibliographic list of the Japanese land snails. H. Minato, Shirahama, 294 pp., 7 pls
- National Institute of Biological Resources. (2019). National Species list of Korea. II. Vertebrates, Invertebrates, Protozoans. Designzip. 908 pp.
