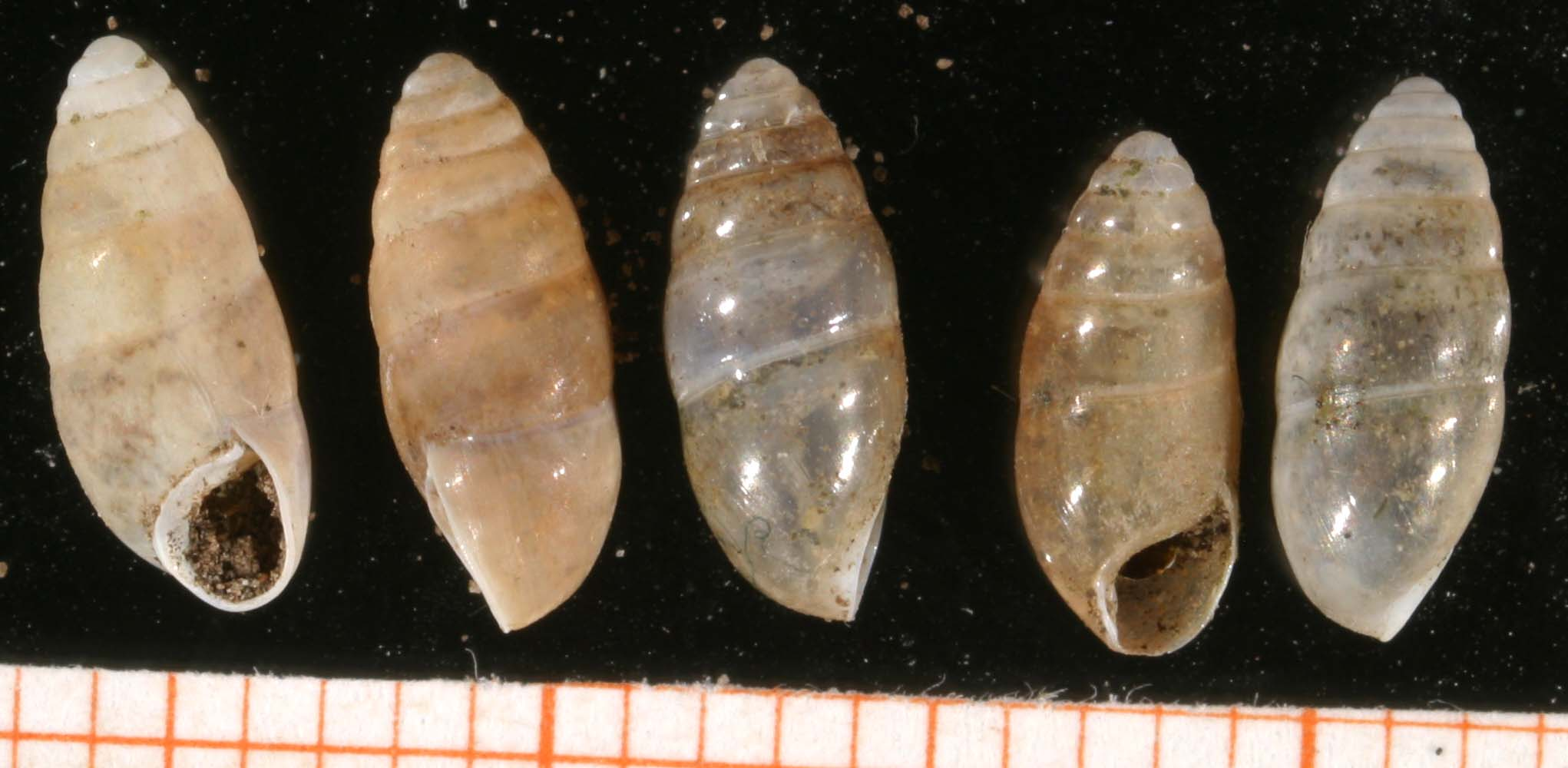
- Hypnophila pupaeformis (Cantraine, 1835), Azecidae, Pulmonata, Gastropoda, Locality: Albania: Malësia, 1 km SW Tamarë

Scientific classification
- Kingdom: Animalia
- Phylum: Mollusca
- Class: Gastropoda
- Order: Stylommatophora
- Family: Azecidae
- Genus: Hypnophila; Bourguignat, 1858

Type species
- Bulimus pupaeformis Cantraine, 1835

Synonyms
- Azeca (Hypnophila) Bourguignat, 1858 (original rank)

= Hypnophila =

Genus of gastropods

Hypnophila is a genus of small air-breathing land snails, terrestrial pulmonate gastropod mollusks in the family Azecidae.

== Species ==
Species in the genus Hypnophila include:

- Hypnophila cyclothyra (O. Boettger, 1885)
- † Hypnophila loxostoma (Klein, 1853)
- Hypnophila malagana E. Gittenberger & Menkhorst, 1983
- Hypnophila polita (Porro, 1838)
- Hypnophila psathyrolena (Bourguignat, 1859)
- Hypnophila pupaeformis (Cantraine, 1835)
- † Hypnophila subrimata (Reuss in Reuss & Meyer, 1849)
- Hypnophila zacynthia (J. R. Roth, 1855)

Species brought into synonymy
* Hypnophila bisacchii Giusti, 1970: synonym of Gomphroa bisacchii (Giusti, 1970)

- Hypnophila boissii (Dupuy, 1851): synonym of Gomphroa boissii (Dupuy, 1851) (superseded combination)
- Hypnophila boissyi (Dupuy, 1851): synonym of Hypnophila boissii (Dupuy, 1851): synonym of Gomphroa boissii (Dupuy, 1851)
- Hypnophila cylindracea (Calcara, 1840): synonym of Gomphroa cylindracea (Calcara, 1840) (superseded combination)
- Hypnophila dohrni (Paulucci, 1882): synonym of Gomphroa dohrni (Paulucci, 1882)
- Hypnophila emiliana (Bourguignat, 1859): synonym of Gomphroa emiliana (Bourguignat, 1859) (superseded combination)
- Hypnophila etrusca (Paulucci, 1886): synonym of Gomphroa etrusca (Paulucci, 1886)
- Hypnophila girottii Esu, 1978: synonym of Gomeziella girottii (Esu, 1978) (new combination)
- Hypnophila incerta (Bourguignat, 1859): synonym of Gomphroa incerta (Bourguignat, 1859) (superseded combination)
- Hypnophila remyi (Boettger, 1949): synonym of Gomphroa remyi (O. Boettger, 1949)
- Hypnophila zirjensis Štamol, Manganelli, Barbato & Giusti, 2018: synonym of Gomphroa zirjensis (Štamol, Manganelli, Barbato & Giusti, 2018) (superseded combination)
