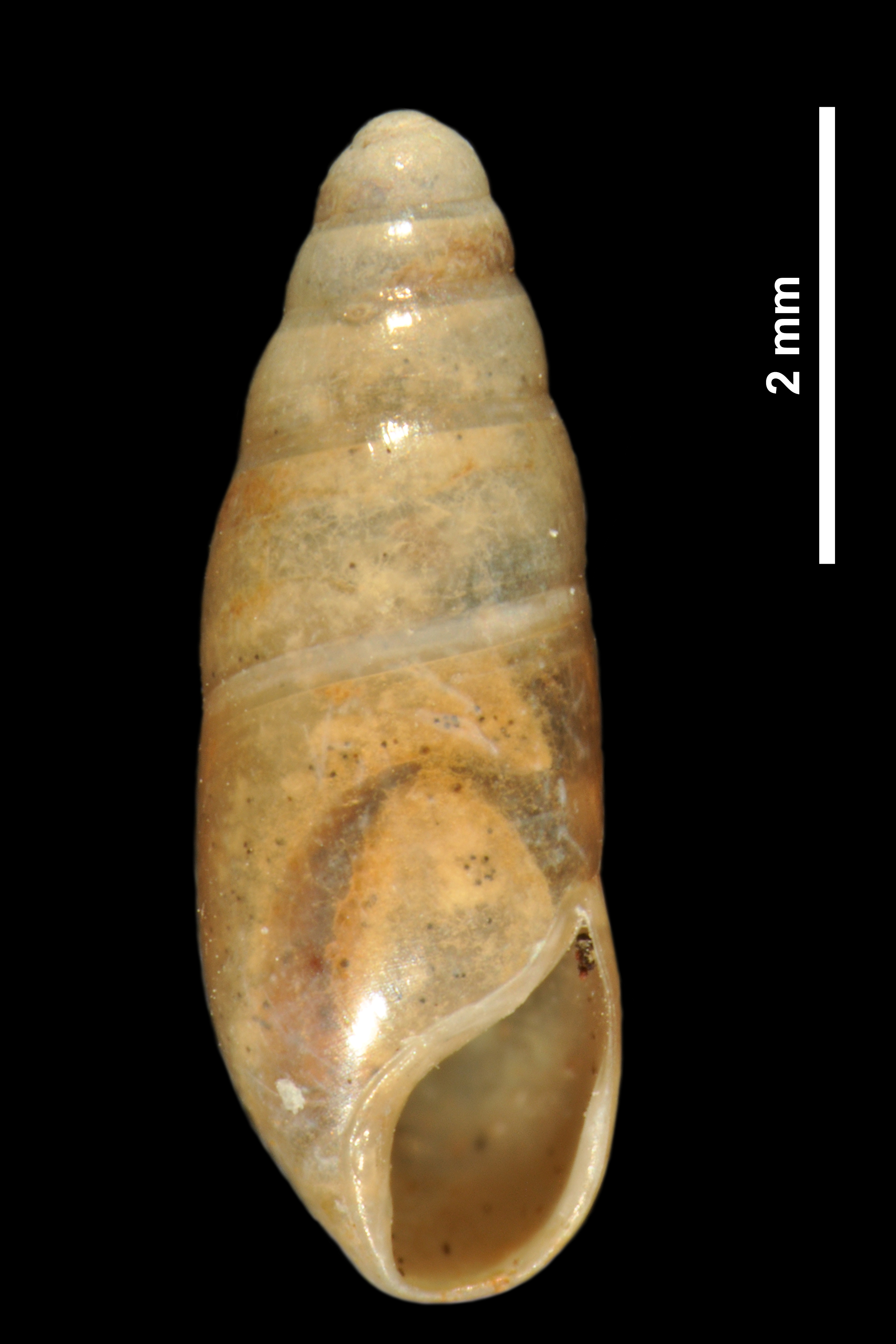
- Shell of Gomphroa remyi (specimen at MNHN, Paris)

Conservation status
- Least Concern (IUCN 3.1)

Scientific classification
- Kingdom: Animalia
- Phylum: Mollusca
- Class: Gastropoda
- Order: Stylommatophora
- Family: Azecidae
- Genus: Gomphroa
- Species: G. remyi

Binomial name
- Gomphroa remyi (C. R. Boettger, 1949)

= Gomphroa remyi =

Species of gastropod

Gomphroa remyi is a species of small air-breathing land snail, terrestrial pulmonate gastropod mollusk in the family Azecidae.

== Distribution ==
This species is endemic to France and was found on Corsica.
