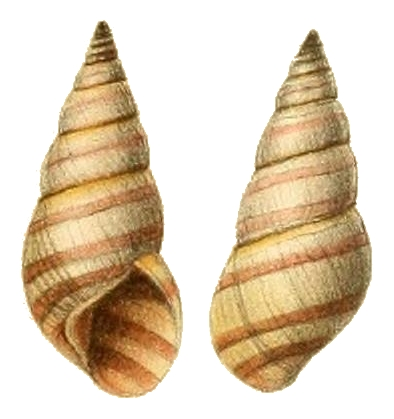
- Drawing of apertural and abapertural view of the shell of Rhachistia rhodotaenia.

Scientific classification
- Kingdom: Animalia
- Phylum: Mollusca
- Class: Gastropoda
- Order: Stylommatophora
- Family: Cerastidae
- Genus: Rhachistia
- Species: R. rhodotaenia

Binomial name
- Rhachistia rhodotaenia (von Martens, 1869)

Synonyms
- Buliminus (Rhachis) rhodotaenia von Martens, 1869; Rachis (Rachis) rhodotaenia von Martens, 1869

= Rhachistia rhodotaenia =

Species of gastropod

Rhachistia rhodotaenia is a species of air-breathing land snail, a pulmonate gastropod mollusc in the family Cerastidae.

Rhachistia rhodotaenia is the type species of the genus Rhachistia.

== Distribution ==
This species occurs in Africa.
