= Barkway Chalk Pit =

Nature reserve in North Hertfordshire

Coordinates: 52.011093°N 0.011493°E

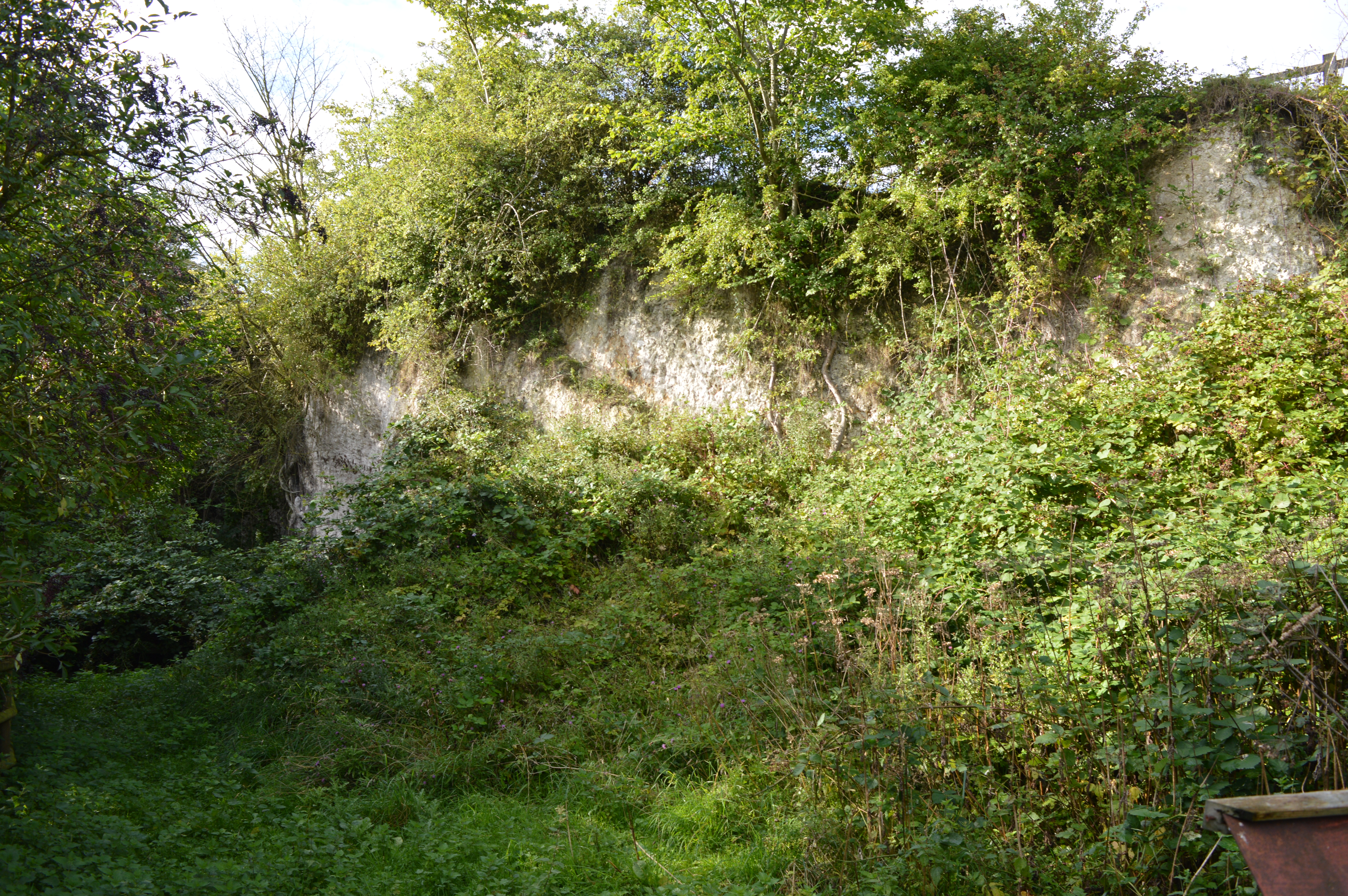

Barkway Chalk Pit is a small (0.3 hectare) nature reserve in Barkway in North Hertfordshire. It was managed by the Herts and Middlesex Wildlife Trust (HMWT). In February 2016 HMWT announced that three sites, Barkway Chalk Pit, Hill End Pit and Pryor's Wood, which HMWT managed on behalf of their owner, North Hertfordshire District Council, were to return to Council management as the Trust was no longer able to meet the cost.

The site has been designated a Regionally important geological site (RIGS) by the Hertfordshire RIGS Group. It exposes a chalk block which is out of position because it was displaced by the Anglian ice sheet which covered Hertfordshire around 450,000 years ago. The vegetation is chalk scrub, and there are many species of birds, including yellowhammer, spotted flycatcher, blue tit and tawny owl.

The entrance to the site is a short distance along an unnamed road which goes north from the junction of The Joint and Royston Road.
