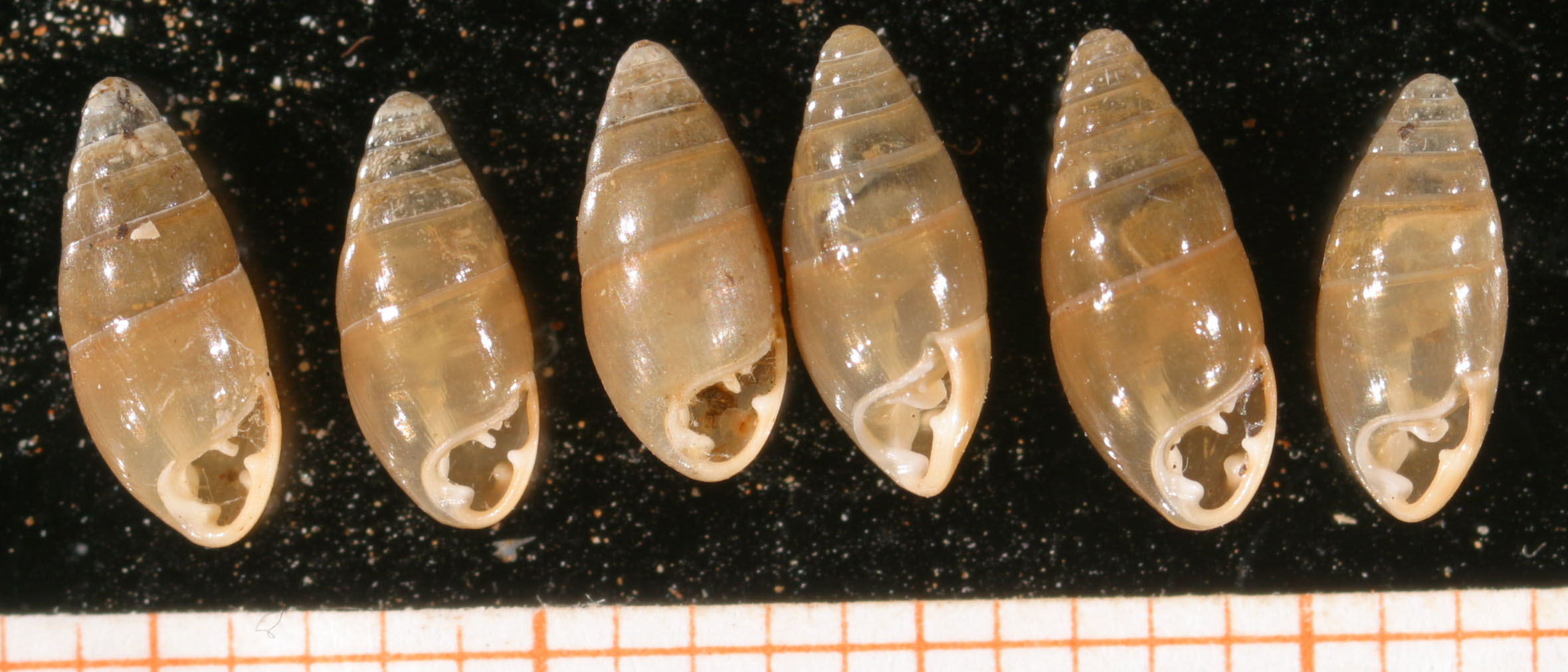

Scientific classification
- Kingdom: Animalia
- Phylum: Mollusca
- Class: Gastropoda
- Order: Stylommatophora
- Family: Azecidae
- Genus: Azeca; Fleming, 1828

Type species
- Turbo tridens Pulteney, 1799

Synonyms
- Agraulina (Azeca) J. Fleming, 1828; Azeca (Azeca) J. Fleming, 1828· accepted, alternate representation; Azeca (Azecastrum) Bourguignat, 1859 (objective synonym); Cionella (Azeka) J. Fleming, 1828 (misspelling; considered a separate genus)

= Azeca =

Genus of gastropods

Azeca is a European genus of small air-breathing land snails, terrestrial pulmonate gastropod mollusks in the family Cochlicopidae.

== Species ==
The only known extant species in the genus Azeca is:

- Azeca goodalli (A. Férrusac, 1821) - the type species

== Extinct species ==
- Azeca baudoni Michaud, 1862 †
- Azeca boettgeri Andreae, 1884 †
- Azeca frechi Andreae, 1902 †
- Azeca lemoinei (Cossmann, 1889) †
- Azeca loryi Michaud, 1862 †
- Azeca lubricella O. Boettger, 1870 †
- Azeca miliolum Paladilhe, 1873 †
- Azeca moljavkoi Prysjazhnjuk in Gozhik & Prysjazhnjuk, 1978 †
- Azeca monocraspedon Slavík, 1869 †
- Azeca paramonovae Prisyazhnyuk in Luleva & Prisyazhnyuk, 1990 †
- Azeca peneckei Andreae, 1892 †
- Azeca perspicua Brusina, 1902 †
- Azeca pumila Slavík, 1869 †
- Azeca sexdentata Gottschick, 1920 †
- Azeca tridentiformis (Gottschick, 1911) †
- Azeca vitrea Klika, 1891 †
