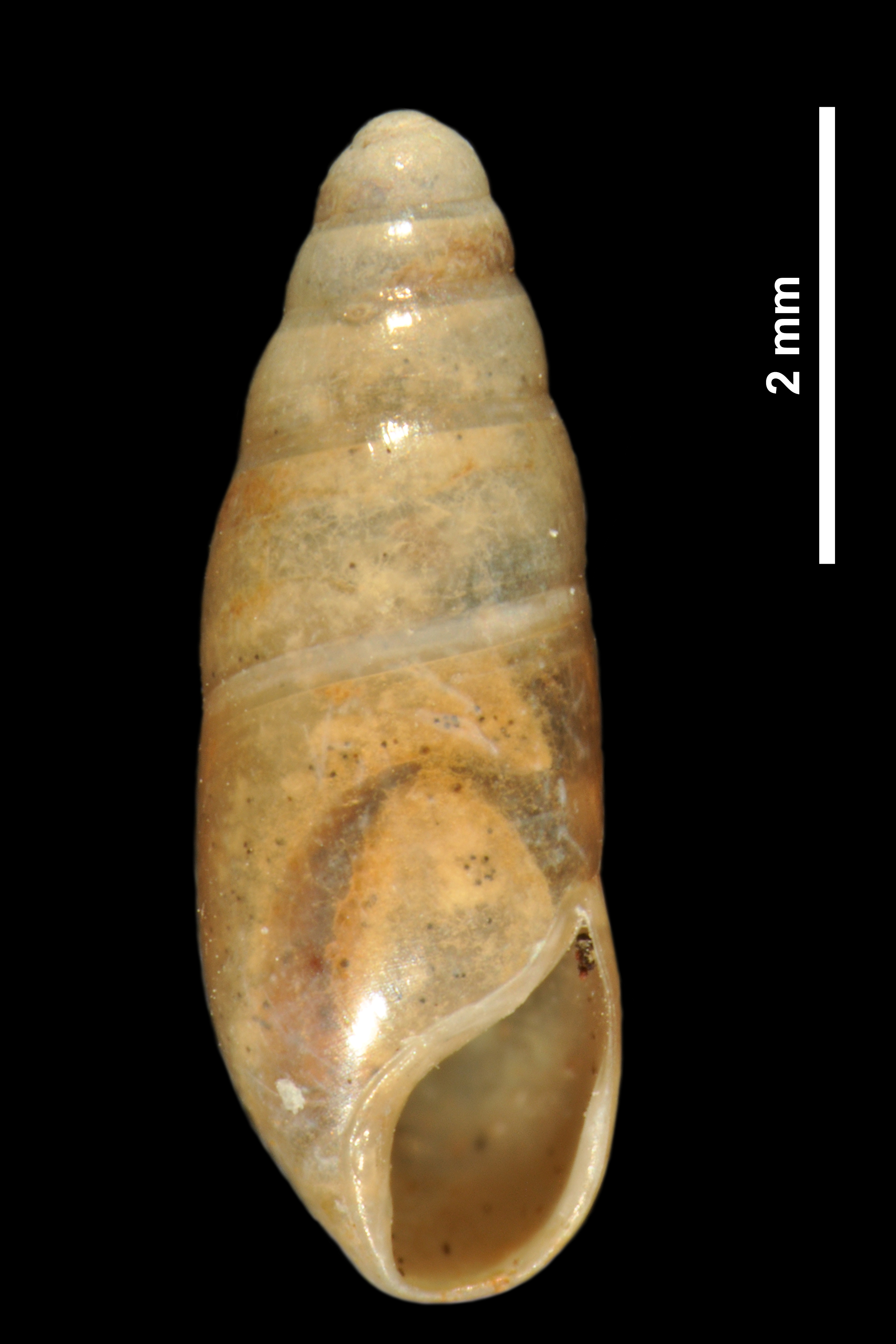
- Shell of Gomphroa remyi

Scientific classification
- Kingdom: Animalia
- Phylum: Mollusca
- Class: Gastropoda
- Order: Stylommatophora
- Family: Azecidae
- Genus: Gomphroa; Bourguignat, 1858

Type species
- Zua boissii Dupuy, 1851

Synonyms
- Zua (Gomphroa) Westerlund, 1903 (original rank)

= Gomphroa =

Genus of gastropods

Gomphroa is a genus of small air-breathing land snails, terrestrial pulmonate gastropod mollusks in the family Azecidae.

== Species ==
Species in the genus Gomphroa include:

- Gomphroa bisacchii (Giusti, 1970)
- Gomphroa boissii (Dupuy, 1851)
- Gomphroa cylindracea (Calcara, 1840)
- Gomphroa dohrni (Paulucci, 1882)
- Gomphroa emiliana (Bourguignat, 1859)
- Gomphroa etrusca (Paulucci, 1886)
- Gomphroa incerta (Bourguignat, 1859)
- Gomphroa remyi (O. Boettger, 1949)
- Gomphroa zirjensis (Štamol, Manganelli, Barbato & Giusti, 2018)
