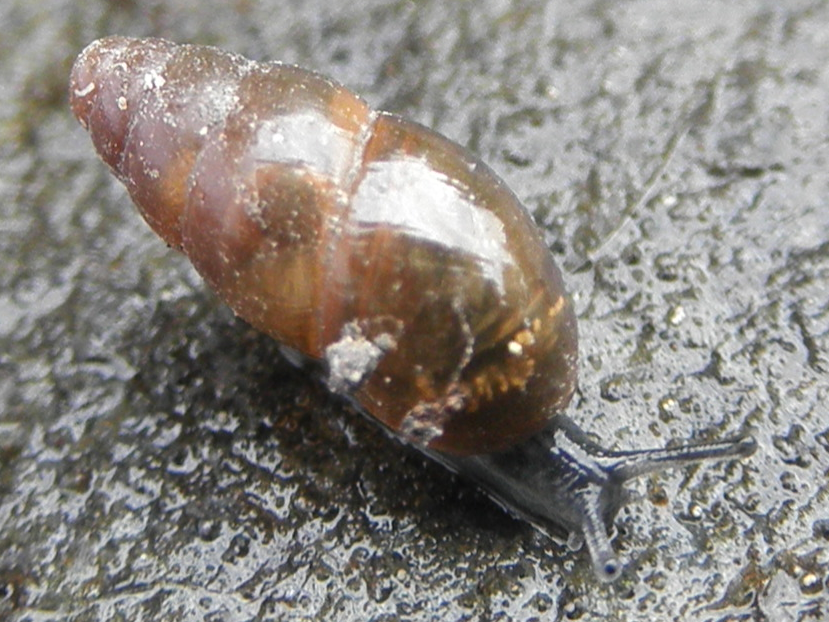
- A live Cochlicopa lubrica

Scientific classification
- Kingdom: Animalia
- Phylum: Mollusca
- Class: Gastropoda
- Order: Stylommatophora
- Superfamily: Pupilloidea
- Family: Cochlicopidae; Pilsbry, 1900 (1879)

= Cochlicopidae =

Family of gastropods

Cochlicopidae is a taxonomic family of small, air-breathing, land snails, terrestrial pulmonate gastropod mollusks in the superfamily Pupilloidea.

== Anatomy ==
In this family, the number of haploid chromosomes lies between 26 and 30 (according to the values in this table).

== Taxonomy ==
The following two subfamilies have been recognized in the taxonomy of Bouchet & Rocroi (2005):

- subfamily Cochlicopinae Pilsbry, 1900 (1879) - synonyms: Cionellidae L. Pfeiffer, 1879; Zuidae Bourguignat, 1884
- subfamily Azecinae Watson, 1920 - synonym: Cryptazecinae Schileyko, 1999

== Genera ==
The family Cochlicopidae includes the following genera:

subfamily Cochlicopinae

- Cochlicopa Férussac, 1821 - synonym: Cionella Jeffreys, 1830

subfamily Azecinae

- Azeca Fleming, 1828
- Cryptazeca Folin & Bérillon, 1877
- Hypnophila Bourguignat, 1858
