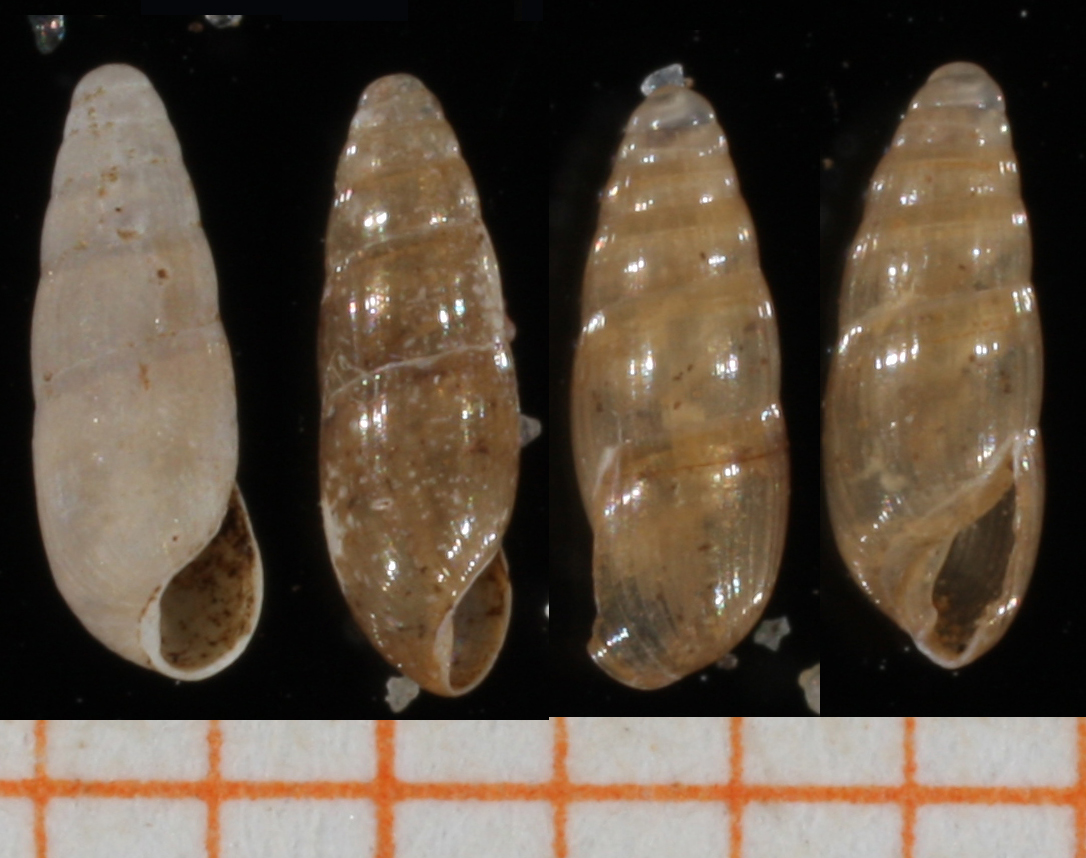
- Cryptazeca subcylindrica shells

Scientific classification
- Kingdom: Animalia
- Phylum: Mollusca
- Class: Gastropoda
- Order: Stylommatophora
- Family: Azecidae
- Genus: Cryptazeca; Folin & Bérillon, 1877

= Cryptazeca =

Genus of snails

Cryptazeca is a genus of small air-breathing land snails, terrestrial gastropod molluscs in the family Azecidae.

== Distribution ==
The distribution of Cryptazeca species includes southwestern France, northeastern Spain (from the western Pyrenées to the Cantabrian Mountains).

== Species ==
Species within the genus Crypazeca include:

- Cryptazeca elongata Gómez, 1990
- Cryptazeca kobelti Gittenberger, 1983
- Cryptazeca monodonta (Folin & Bérillon, 1877) - type species
- Cryptazeca spelaea Gómez, 1990
- Cryptazeca subcylindrica Folin & Bérillon, 1877
- Cryptazeca vasconica (Kobelt, 1894)
