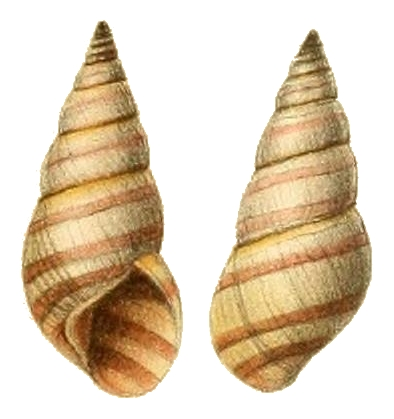
- Drawing of apertural and abapertural view of the shell of Rhachistia rhodotaenia.

Scientific classification
- Kingdom: Animalia
- Phylum: Mollusca
- Class: Gastropoda
- Order: Stylommatophora
- Suborder: Helicina
- Infraorder: Pupilloidei
- Superfamily: Pupilloidea
- Family: Cerastidae; Wenz, 1923

Synonyms
- Cerastuidae Wenz, 1930; Pachnodidae Steenberg, 1925

= Cerastidae =

Family of gastropods

Cerastidae is a family of air-breathing land snails, terrestrial pulmonate gastropod mollusks in the order Stylommatophora.

== Genera ==
- Achatinelloides Nevill, 1878
- Altenaia Zilch, 1972
- Amimopina Solem, 1964
- Archeorachis Schileyko, 1998
- Cerastus E. von Martens, 1860
- Conulinus E. von Martens, 1895
- Darwininitium Budha & Mordan, 2012
- Euryptyxis P. Fischer, 1883
- Gittenedouardia Bank & Menkhorst, 2008
- Hoqia Neubert, 2005
- Limicena Connolly, 1925
- Microscintilla Neubert, 2002
- Nesiocerastus Van Mol & Coppois, 1980
- Nesobia Ancey, 1887
- Pachnodus E. von Martens, 1860
- Paracerastus Thiele, 1934
- Passamaella Clessin, 1878
- Pleurorhachis Connolly, 1938
- Polychordia Connolly, 1941
- Rachis Albers, 1850
- Rhachidina Thiele, 1911
- Rhachistia Connolly, 1925
- Soqena Neubert, 2005
- Zebrinops Thiele, 1931

== Description ==
Anatomically speaking, there is no flagellum in the reproductive system of snails in the family Cerastidae, and this is what distinguishes this family from its sister group the family Enidae.
