= Wilhelm August Wenz =

German malacologist

Wilhelm August Wenz (21 October 1886 – 12 September 1945) was a German malacologist, born in Frankfurt am Main. He is the author of the 7-part Gastropoda section of Handbuch der Paläozoologie (1938-1944), a very important review that described all known fossil genera. Only a few copies of this rare work survive: almost the entire stock of later editions was destroyed during the Second World War.

== Bibliography (selection) ==
- (in German) Fischer K. & Wenz W. A. (1914) Die Landschneckenkalke des Mainzer Beckens und ihre Fauna.
- Wenz W. (1923-1930) "Gastropoda extramarina tertiaria" Fossilium catalogus, I: Animalia. 3387 pp., published in parts.
- (in German) Wenz W. (1938-1944) Teil 1: Allgemeiner Teil und Prosobranchia. In: Schindewolf O. H. (ed.) Handbuch der Paläozoologie, Band 6, Gastropoda, Verlag Gebrüder Bornträger, Berlin, xii + 1639 pp.
