= Azecidae =

Scientific classification
- Kingdom: Animalia
- Phylum: Mollusca
- Class: Gastropoda
- Order: Stylommatophora
- Suborder: Helicina
- Infraorder: Pupilloidei
- Superfamily: Azecoidea
- Family: Azecidae; H. Watson, 1920

Synonyms
- Cryptazecinae Schileyko, 1999

Family of gastropods

Azecidae is a family of small and very small air-breathing land snails, terrestrial gastropod mollusks in the superfamily Azecoidea.

== Families ==
- Azeca J. Fleming, 1828
- Cryptazeca de Folin & Bérillon, 1877
- Gomeziella Cianfanelli, Bodon, Giusti & Manganelli, 2018
- Gomphroa Westerlund, 1903
- Hypnocarnica Cianfanelli & Bodon, 2018
- Hypnophila Bourguignat, 1858
