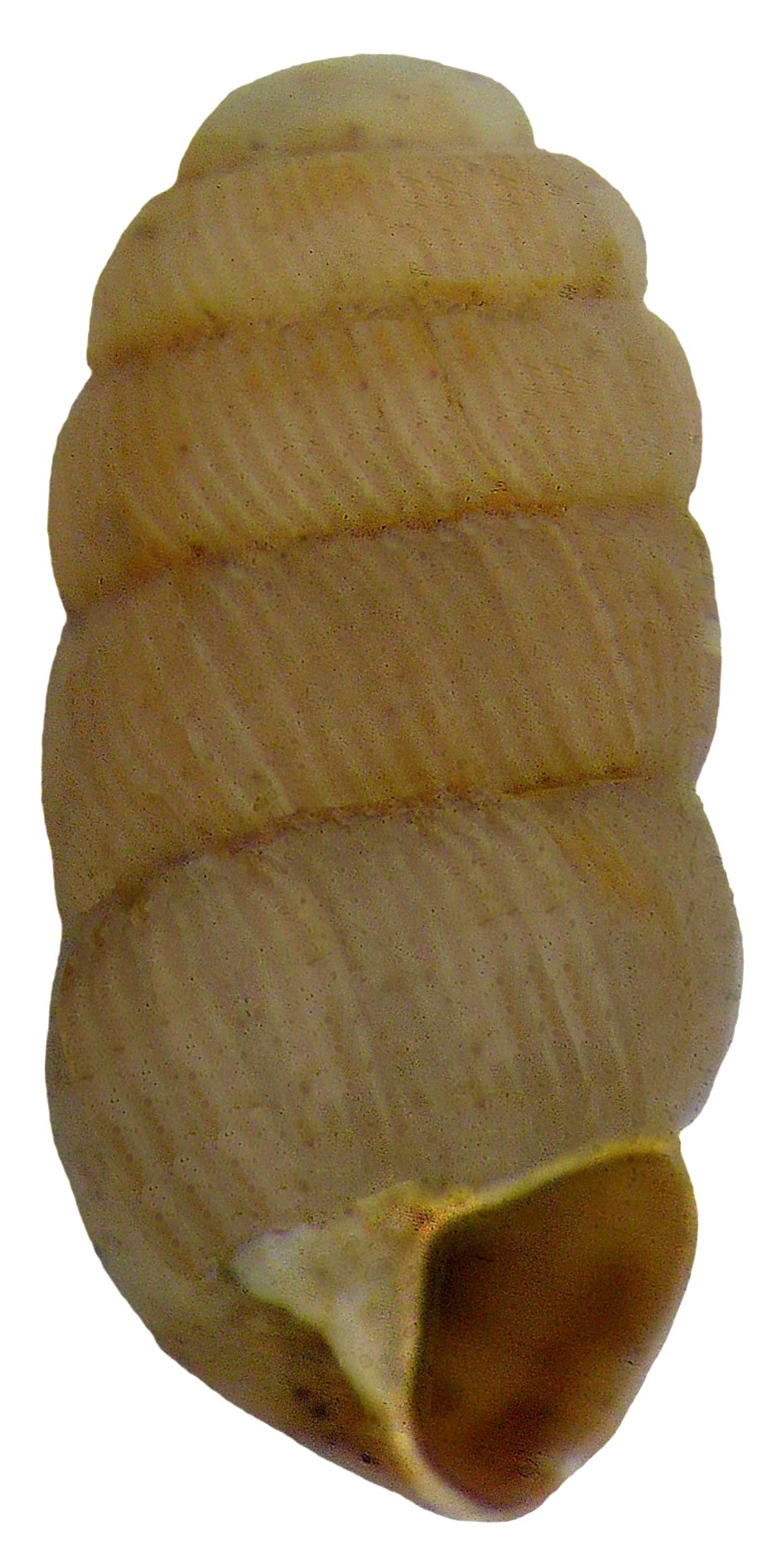
- Truncatellina cylindrica

Scientific classification
- Domain: Eukaryota
- Kingdom: Animalia
- Phylum: Mollusca
- Class: Gastropoda
- Superorder: Eupulmonata
- Order: Stylommatophora
- Suborder: Helicina
- Infraorder: Pupilloidei

Superfamilies
- See text

= Pupilloidei =

Infraorder of molluscs

The Pupilloidei is an taxonomic infraorder of air-breathing land snails, semislugs and slugs, terrestrial pulmonate gastropod molluscs in the suborder Helicina.

== Superfamilies ==
- Azecoidea H. Watson, 1920
- Chondrinoidea Steenberg, 1925
- † Dendropupoidea Wenz, 1938
- Pupilloidea W. Turton, 1831

Synonyms

- Achatinelloidea Gulick, 1873: synonym of Pupilloidea W. Turton, 1831
- Cochlicopoidea Pilsbry, 1900 (1879): synonym of Pupilloidea W. Turton, 1831
- Enoidea B. B. Woodward, 1903 (1880): synonym of Pupilloidea W. Turton, 1831
- Partuloidea Pilsbry, 1900: synonym of Pupilloidea W. Turton, 1831
