= Addisonia (disambiguation) =

Addisonia Dall, 1882 is a genus of sea snails in the family Addisoniidae.

Addisonia may also refer to:

- Addisonia Rusby, 1893, a synonym of Helogyne Nutt., 1841, a genus of flowering plants in the family Asteraceae
- Addisonia (journal), an illustrated journal published by the New York Botanical Garden from 1916 to 1964
