= Addisonia brophyi =

Scientific classification
- Kingdom: Animalia
- Phylum: Mollusca
- Class: Gastropoda
- Subclass: Vetigastropoda
- Order: Lepetellida
- Family: Addisoniidae
- Genus: Addisonia
- Species: A. brophyi

Binomial name
- Addisonia brophyi McLean, 1985

Species of gastropod

Addisonia brophyi is a species of sea snail, a marine gastropod mollusk in the family Addisoniidae.

== Distribution ==
This species occurs in the Pacific Ocean off Santa Barbara, California, USA to Southern Baja California, Mexico.
