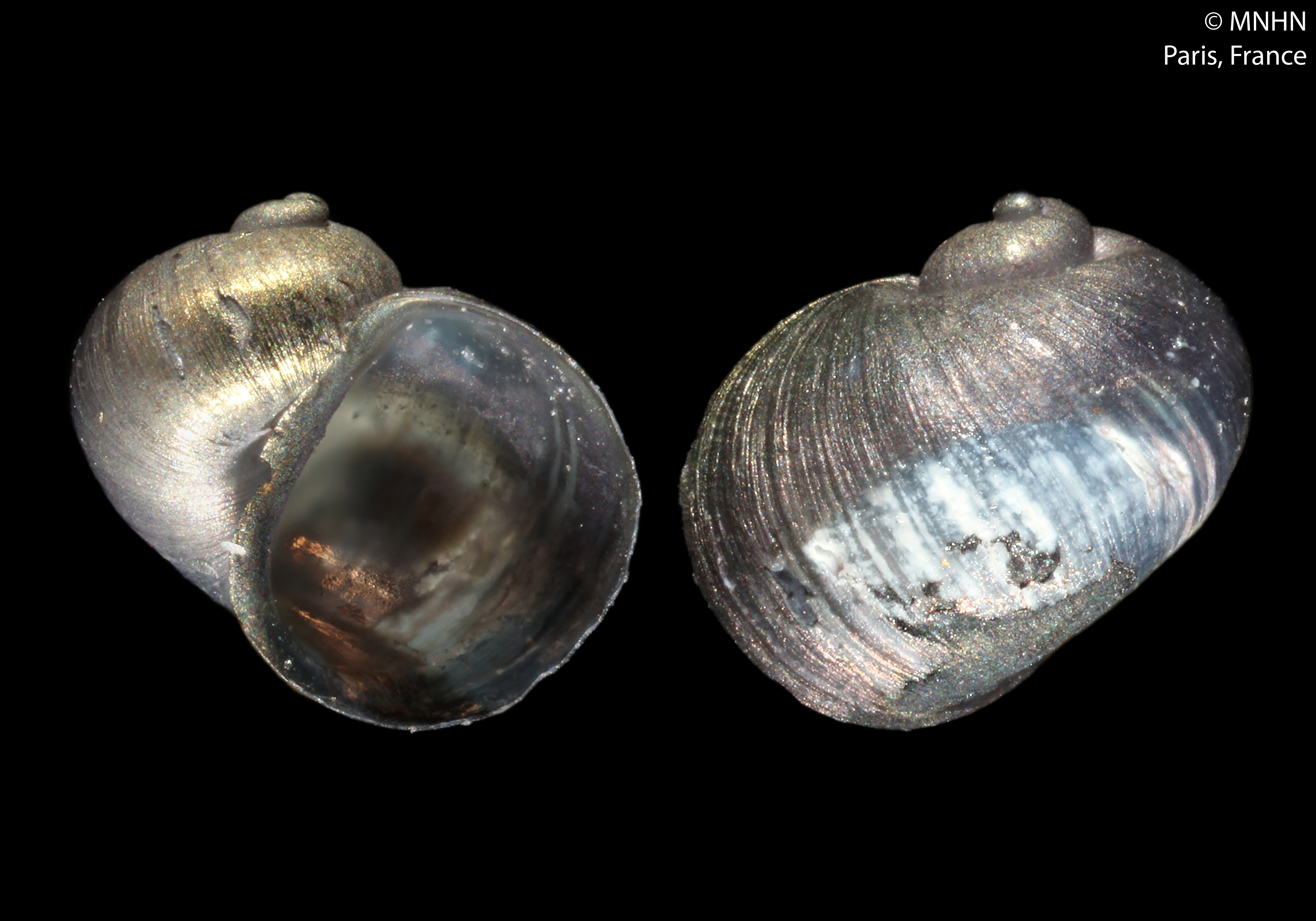
- Shell of Helicopelta rostricola (holotype at MNHN, Paris)

Scientific classification
- Kingdom: Animalia
- Phylum: Mollusca
- Class: Gastropoda
- Subclass: Vetigastropoda
- Order: Lepetellida
- Family: Addisoniidae
- Subfamily: Helicopeltinae
- Genus: Helicopelta
- Species: H. rostricola

Binomial name
- Helicopelta rostricola Marshall, 1996

= Helicopelta rostricola =

Species of gastropod

Helicopelta rostricola is a species of deep water sea snail, a marine gastropod mollusk in the family Addisoniidae, the true limpets.

== Description ==
The length of the shell attains 1.8 mm.

== Distribution ==
This species occurs in the Coral Sea.
