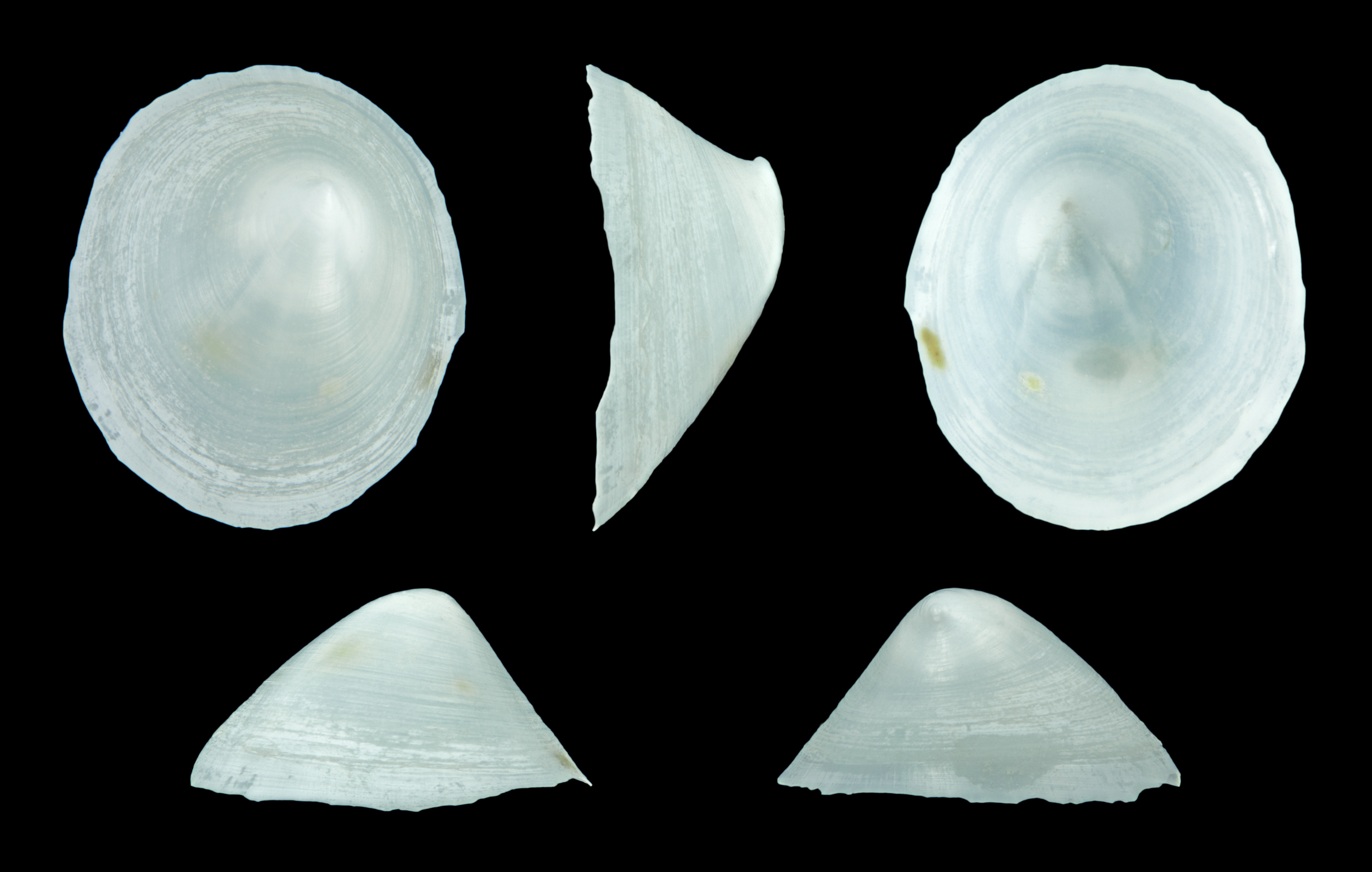
- Five views of Addisonia excentrica

Scientific classification
- Kingdom: Animalia
- Phylum: Mollusca
- Class: Gastropoda
- Subclass: Vetigastropoda
- Order: Lepetellida
- Family: Addisoniidae
- Genus: Addisonia
- Species: A. excentrica

Binomial name
- Addisonia excentrica (Tiberi, 1855)

Synonyms
- Addisonia enodis Simone, 1996; Addisonia excentros Jeffreys 1884; Addisonia lateralis (Requien, 1848); Addisonia lateralis var. paradoxa Dall, 1882; Addisonia paradoxa Dall, 1882; Gadinia lateralis Requien 18481; Gadinia excentrica Tiberi 1855; Tylodina excentrica Monterosato 1872

= Addisonia excentrica =

Species of gastropod

Addisonia excentrica is a species of sea snail, a marine gastropod mollusk in the family Addisoniidae.

== Distribution ==
This species can be found in European waters and in the Mediterranean Sea.

== Description ==
The maximum recorded shell length is 20.3 mm. The size of the ovate shell varies between 8 mm and 20 mm. It is thin and whitish. The apex presents an appearance as if an embryonic tip (perhaps spiral) had fallen and been replaced by a peculiarly blunt ovate apex, which in the young shell is nearly marginal, posterior and to the left of the middle line, but in the adult is considerably within the margin, curved downward and backward and much more asymmetrical. The sculpture of the shell shows faint grooves radiating from the (smooth) apex and reticulated by the stronger concentric lines of growth, beside which the extremely inflated arch of the back is somewhat obscurely concentrically waved. The shell has a polished appearance over the sculpture. The thin margins are sharp. The interior of the shell is smooth and somewhat polished. The scar of the pedal muscle is narrow and at a considerable distance within the margin. The anterior ends of the scar are enlarged and hooked backward on their inner edges. These ends are connected by a line broadly arched forward and marking the attachments of the mantle to the shell over the head.

== Habitat ==
Minimum recorded depth is 91 m. Maximum recorded depth is 1170 m.
