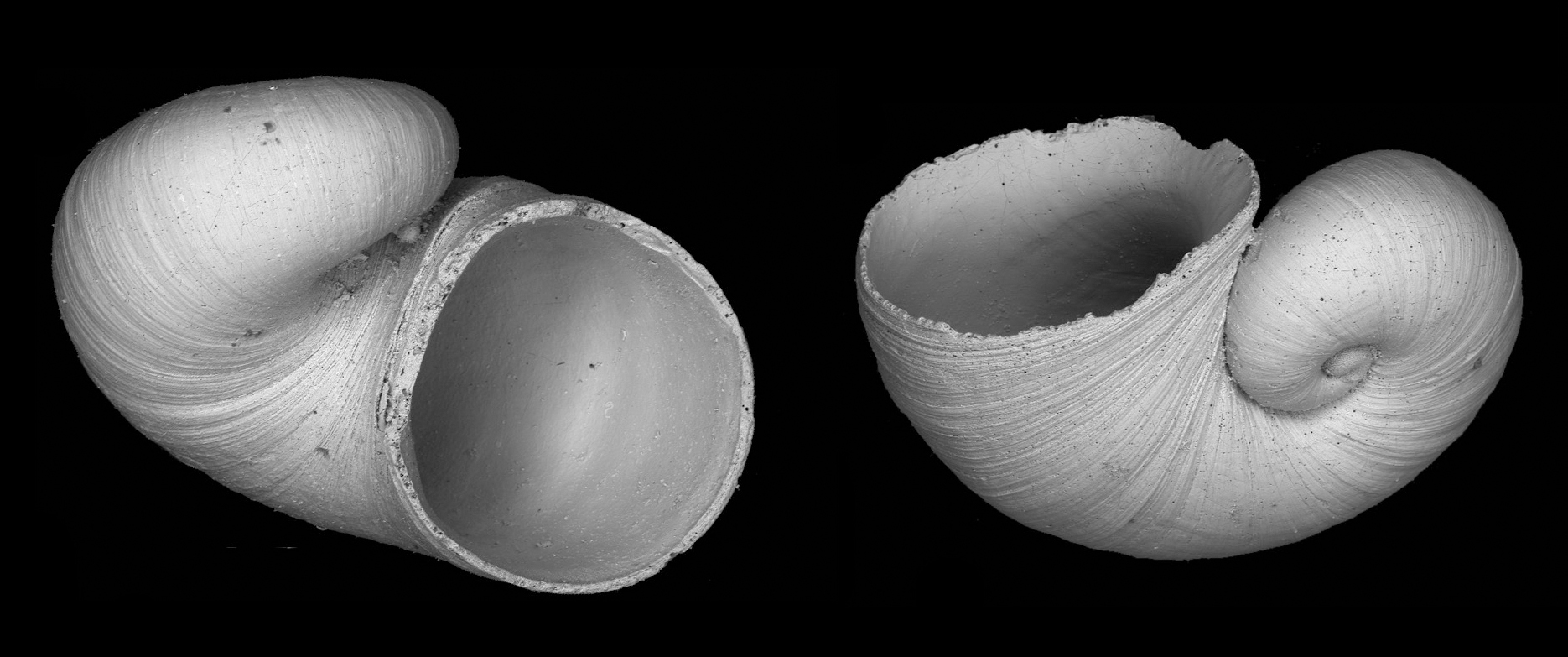
- Shell of Helicopelta marshalli (paratype at MNHN, Paris)

Scientific classification
- Kingdom: Animalia
- Phylum: Mollusca
- Class: Gastropoda
- Subclass: Vetigastropoda
- Order: Lepetellida
- Superfamily: Lepetelloidea
- Family: Addisoniidae
- Subfamily: Helicopeltinae
- Genus: Helicopelta; Marshall, 1996

Type species
- Helicopelta rostricola B. A. Marshall, 1996

= Helicopelta =

Genus of gastropods

Helicopelta is a genus of sea snails, marine gastropod mollusks in the family Addisoniidae.

== Species ==
Species within the genus Helicopelta include:

- Helicopelta marshalli Rubio & Rolán, 2020
- Helicopelta rostricola Marshall, 1996
