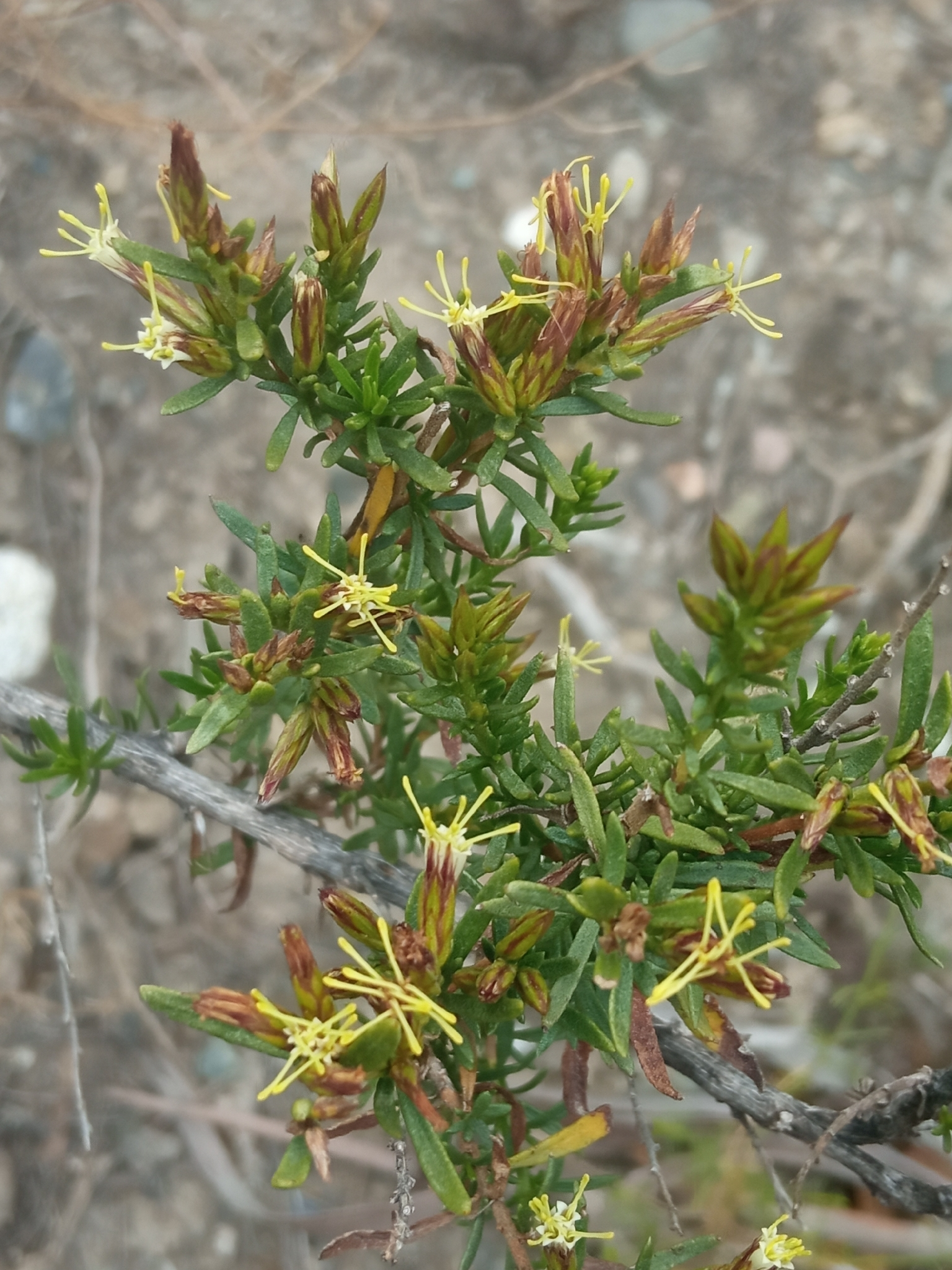
- Helogyne straminea in Bolivia

Scientific classification
- Kingdom: Plantae
- Clade: Embryophytes
- Clade: Tracheophytes
- Clade: Spermatophytes
- Clade: Angiosperms
- Clade: Eudicots
- Clade: Asterids
- Order: Asterales
- Family: Asteraceae
- Subfamily: Asteroideae
- Tribe: Eupatorieae
- Genus: Helogyne; Nutt. 1841 not Benth. 1844

Synonyms
- Leto Phil.; Addisonia Rusby; Brachyandra Phil.

= Helogyne =

Genus of flowering plants

Helogyne is a genus of South American flowering plants in the family Asteraceae.

Species

- Helogyne apaloidea Nutt. - Chile, Peru
- Helogyne calocephala Mattf. - Peru
- Helogyne ferreyrii R.M.King & H.Rob. - Peru
- Helogyne hutchisonii R.M.King & H.Rob. - Peru
- Helogyne macrogyne (Phil.) B.L.Rob. - Chile
- Helogyne straminea (DC.) B.L.Rob. - Bolivia, Peru
- Helogyne tacaquirensis Hieron. - Bolivia, Peru
- Helogyne virgata (Rusby) B.L.Rob. - Bolivia, Peru
