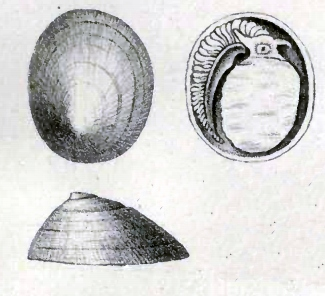
- Drawing of three views of Addisonia excentrica

Scientific classification
- Kingdom: Animalia
- Phylum: Mollusca
- Class: Gastropoda
- Subclass: Vetigastropoda
- Order: Lepetellida
- Superfamily: Lepetelloidea
- Family: Addisoniidae
- Subfamily: Addisoniinae
- Genus: Addisonia; Dall, 1882

= Addisonia =

Genus of gastropods

Addisonia is a genus of sea snails, marine gastropod mollusks in the family Addisoniidae.

== Description ==
The ovate shell has a subconical shape. It is strongly symmetrical, porcellaneous, and thin. The blunt apex is curved backward, downward, and to the left. The shell has no epidermis. The margin is unthickened, simple, and entire. The pedal muscular impression is horseshoe-shaped and interrupted in front.

The radula has a large simple rhachidian tooth with, on each side, two large, simple transverse laterals, followed by two minute ones, and a large outer lateral with a strong tridentate cusp, outside of which is a single scale-like flat uncinus, bearing an elongated thickened ridge, but no cusp.

Soft parts : the head is provided with two tentacles without eyes or eye tubercles. The muzzle is plain and simple. The foot is thin, orbicular, without lateral or posterior tubercles, processes or fringes. The mantle edge is simple and thickened. The gill is composed of leaflets as in Patella, the series starting on the right behind the head and continued within the mantle edge backward. The body of the animal is asymmetrically placed with regard to the aperture of the shell to afford room for the enormous series of branchial leaflets. The anus opening is behind and above the head slightly to the right of the median line, and indicated by a small papilla.

== Species ==
Species within the genus Addisonia include:

- Addisonia brophyi McLean, 1985
- Addisonia excentrica (Tiberi, 1855)

Species brought into synonymy

- Addisonia enodis Simone, 1996 : synonym of Addisonia excentrica (Tiberi, 1855)
- Addisonia lateralis (Requien, 1848): synonym of Addisonia excentrica (Tiberi, 1855)
- Addisonia paradoxa Dall, 1882: synonym of Addisonia excentrica
