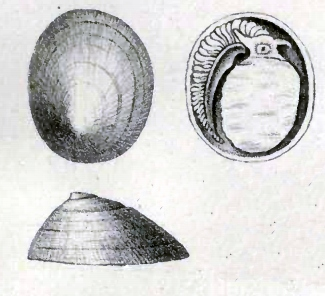
- Drawing of three views of Addisonia excentrica

Scientific classification
- Kingdom: Animalia
- Phylum: Mollusca
- Class: Gastropoda
- Subclass: Vetigastropoda
- Order: Lepetellida
- Superfamily: Lepetelloidea
- Family: Addisoniidae; Dall, 1882

= Addisoniidae =

Family of gastropods

Addisoniidae is a family of sea snails, deepwater true limpets, marine gastropod mollusks in the clade Vetigastropoda (according to the taxonomy of the Gastropoda by Bouchet & Rocroi, 2005).

== Subfamilies and genera ==
Subfamilies and genera within the family Addisoniidae include:

Subfamily Addisoniinae Dall, 1882

- Addisonia Dall, 1882

Subfamily Helicopeltinae Marshall, 1996

- Helicopelta Marshall, 1996
