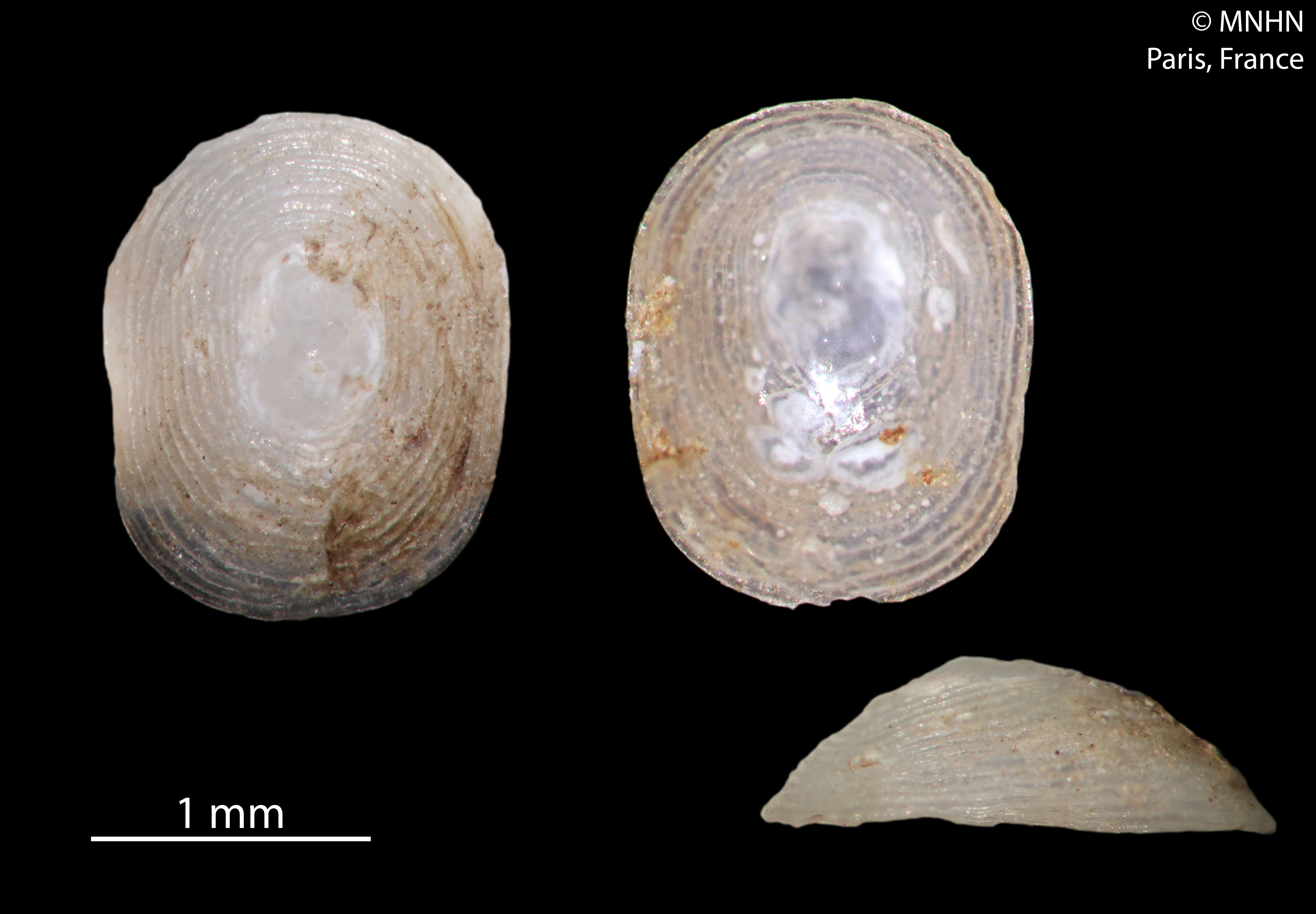
- Shell of Colotrachelus hestica (paratype at MNHN, Paris)

Scientific classification
- Kingdom: Animalia
- Phylum: Mollusca
- Class: Gastropoda
- Subclass: Vetigastropoda
- Order: Lepetellida
- Superfamily: Lepetelloidea
- Family: Caymanabyssiidae
- Genus: Colotrachelus
- Species: C. hestica

Binomial name
- Colotrachelus hestica B.A. Marshall, 1986

= Colotrachelus hestica =

Species of gastropod

Colotrachelus hestica is a species of small sea snail, a marine gastropod mollusk in the family Pseudococculinidae, the false limpets.

== Distribution ==
This marine species is endemic to New Zealand.
