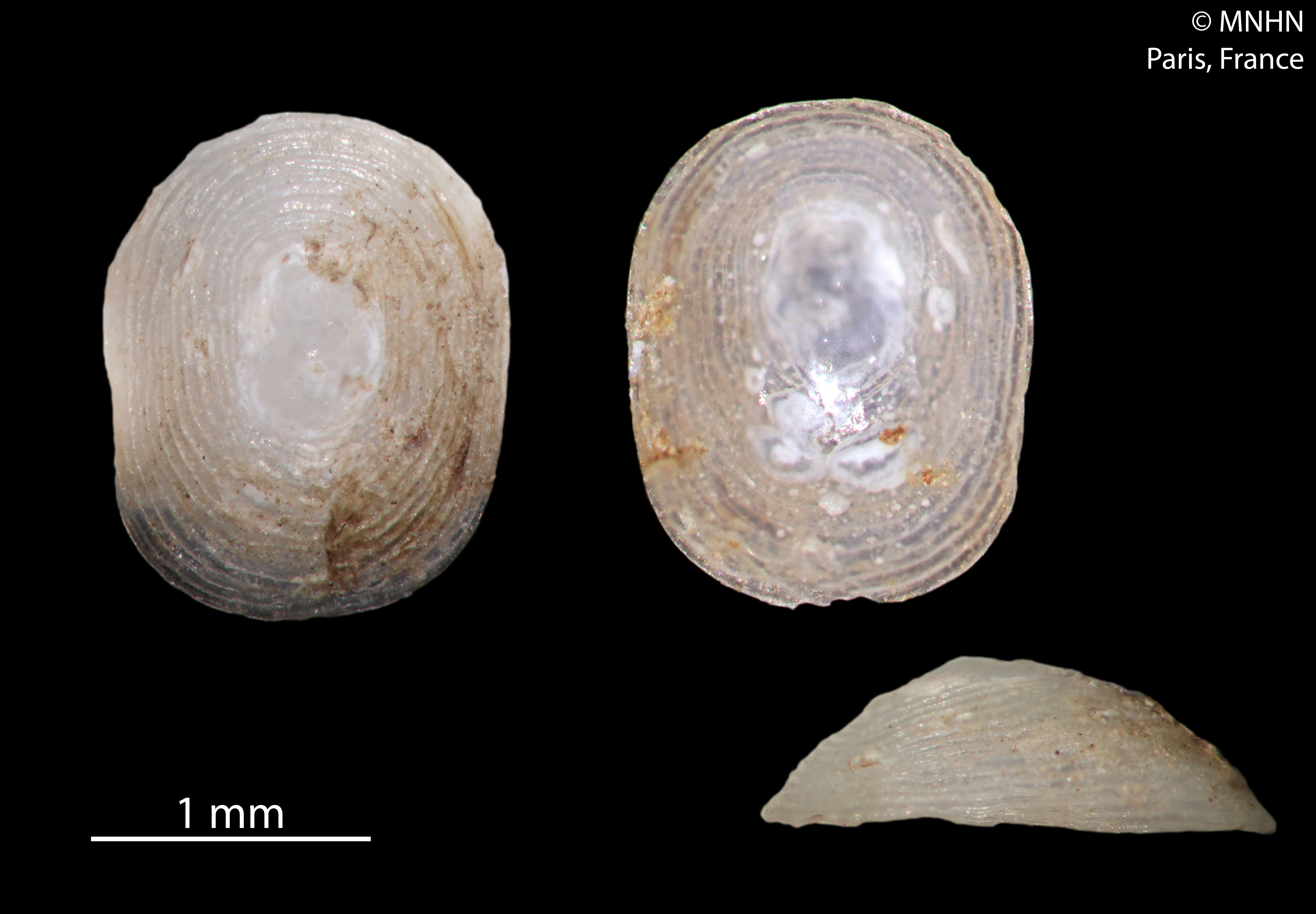
- Shell of Colotrachelus hestica

Scientific classification
- Kingdom: Animalia
- Phylum: Mollusca
- Class: Gastropoda
- Subclass: Vetigastropoda
- Order: Lepetellida
- Superfamily: Lepetelloidea
- Family: Caymanabyssiidae
- Genus: Colotrachelus; B.A. Marshall, 1986

= Colotrachelus =

Genus of gastropods

Colotrachelus is a genus of small sea snails, marine gastropod mollusks in the family Caymanabyssiidae, the false limpets.

== Species ==
Species within the genus Colotrachelus include:

- Colotrachelus hestica B.A. Marshall, 1986
