= Selenizone =

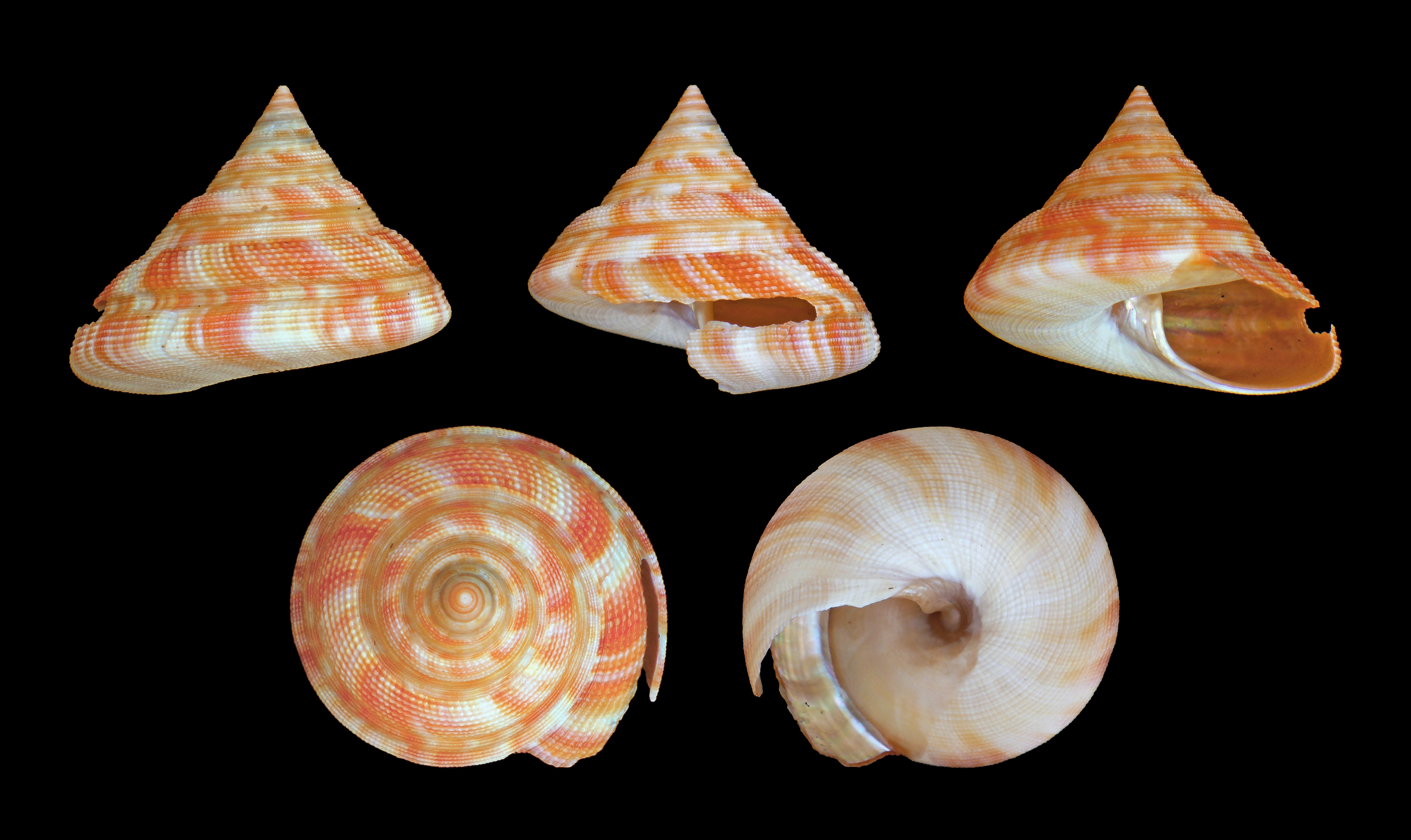
Four view of the slit shell Mikadotrochus hirasei. The first view shows the selenizone well. The other views show its relationship to the slit in the shell.

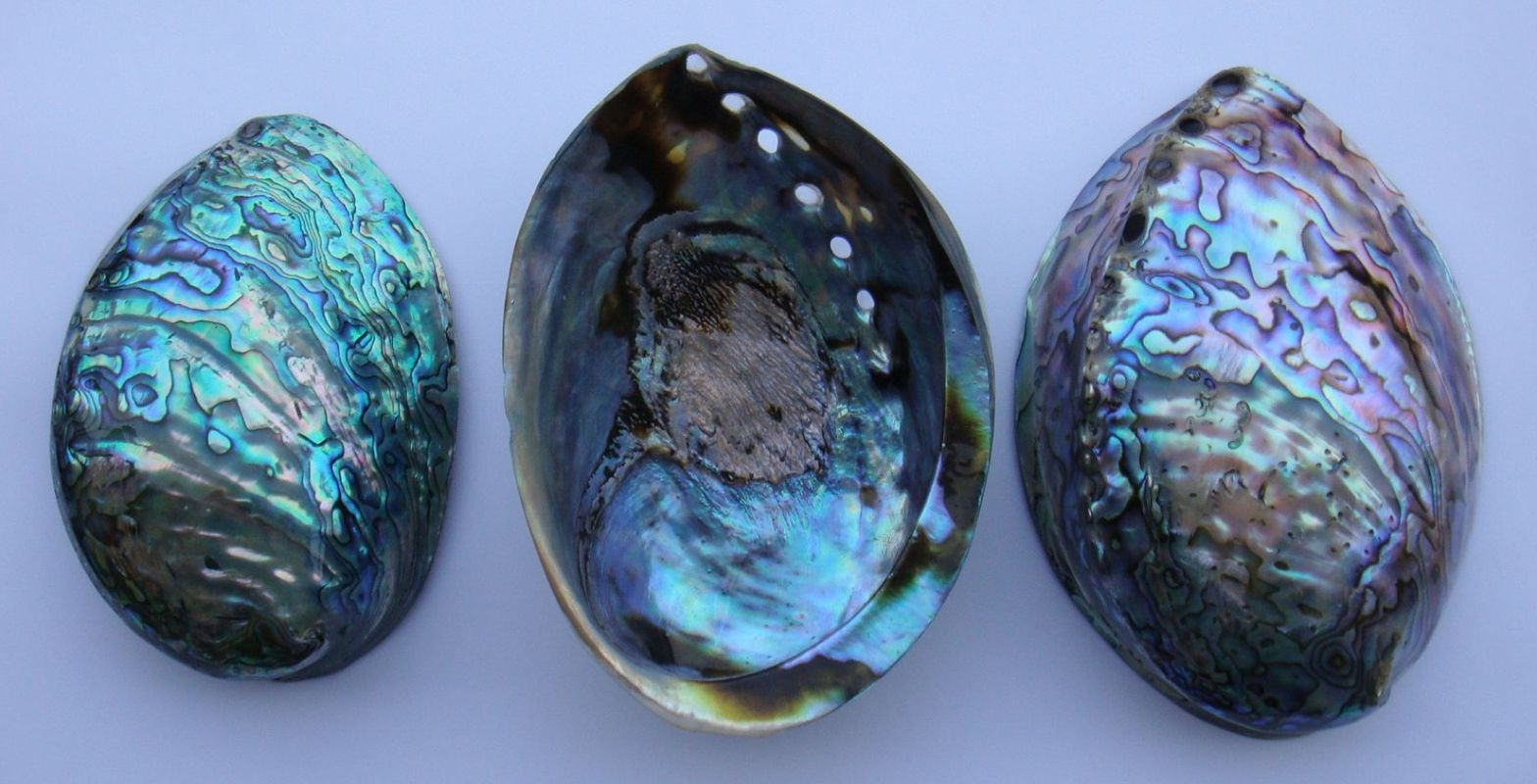
Three artificially polished shells of a New Zealand abalone, a Haliotis species, probably H. iris. The central shell clearly shows the selenizone as a series of holes

A selenizone (from the Greek "selene" meaning "moon", and "zone" meaning "girdle") is an anatomical structure that exists in the shells of some families of living sea snails: the slit shells, the little slit shells and the abalone, which are marine gastropod mollusks from ancient lineages.

It is a spiral band of crescentric growth lines or threads (lunulae) on the shell surface due to the semicircular end of a notch or slit on the outer lip.

A structure of the same type exists in several fossil groups of mollusks, including all the fossil families of slit shells, as well as three superfamilies of what may have been gastropods, but may possibly have been monoplacophorans or paragastropods instead.

The function of the holes and slits in living sea snails is to allow for exhalant water circulation, which is important for respiration and other functions. It has also been suggested that the selenizone may serve to reinforce the shell against catastrophic breakage during predation attempts.

A new shell-morphological term 'sutsel' has been introduced by Daniel Geiger for the area between the SUTure and the SELenizone.

== In living gastropods ==
In the Pleurotomariidae (the slit shells), and the Scissurellidae (the little slit shells), the selenizone is a groove on the periphery of the shell which forms as the shell grows by the gradual sealing up of a slit that extends back from the edge of the aperture of the shell.

In the Haliotidae, the abalone, the selenizone takes the form of a series of holes in the shell (reaching back from the leading growth edge of the aperture) which form as the shell grows. The older holes are gradually sealed up as the shell grows and new holes form. Each abalone species has a typical number of holes in the selenizone which remain open, and this feature is diagnostic for the individual species.

== In fossil groups ==
A selenizone is also present in several superfamilies of fossil mollusks. Not surprisingly it is seen in the numerous fossil gastropod families within the Pleurotomarioidae. The selenizone also exists in the Bellerophontoidea, which may be gastropods or monoplacophorans; in the Euomphaloidea, which are probably gastropods, but may be monoplacophorans; and in the Macluritoidea, which are either archaeogastropods or Paragastropoda Linsley & Kier, 1984, (paragastropods are a group of mollusks that superficially resemble gastropods, but were untorted).

== Taxa ==
A list of superfamilies and families (both living and fossil) which show this structure, based on the taxonomy of Bouchet et al 2005. The taxa that are entirely extinct are marked with a dagger † :

Extant taxa:

- Haliotoidea
  - Haliotidae
- Pleurotomarioidea
  - Pleurotomariidae
- Scissurelloidea
  - Anatomidae
  - Scissurellidae

Fossil taxa:

Gastropods

- Haliotoidea
  - † Temnotropidae
- Pleurotomariacea
  - † Family Catantostomatidae
  - † Family Kittlidiscidae
  - † Family Phymatopleuridae
  - † Family Polytremariidae
  - † Family Portlockiellidae
  - † Family Rhaphischismatidae
  - † Family Trochotomidae
  - † Family Zygitidae

Gastropods or monoplacophorans or paragastropods

- †Bellerophontoidea
  - † Bellerophontidae
  - † Bucanellidae
  - † Bucaniidae
  - † Euphemitidae
  - † Pterothecidae
  - † Sinuitidae
  - † Tremanotidae
  - † Tropidodiscidae
- †Euomphaloidea
  - † Euomphalidae
  - † Helicotomidae
  - † Lesueurillidae
  - † Omphalocirridae
  - † Omphalotrochidae
- †Macluritoidea
  - † Macluritidae
