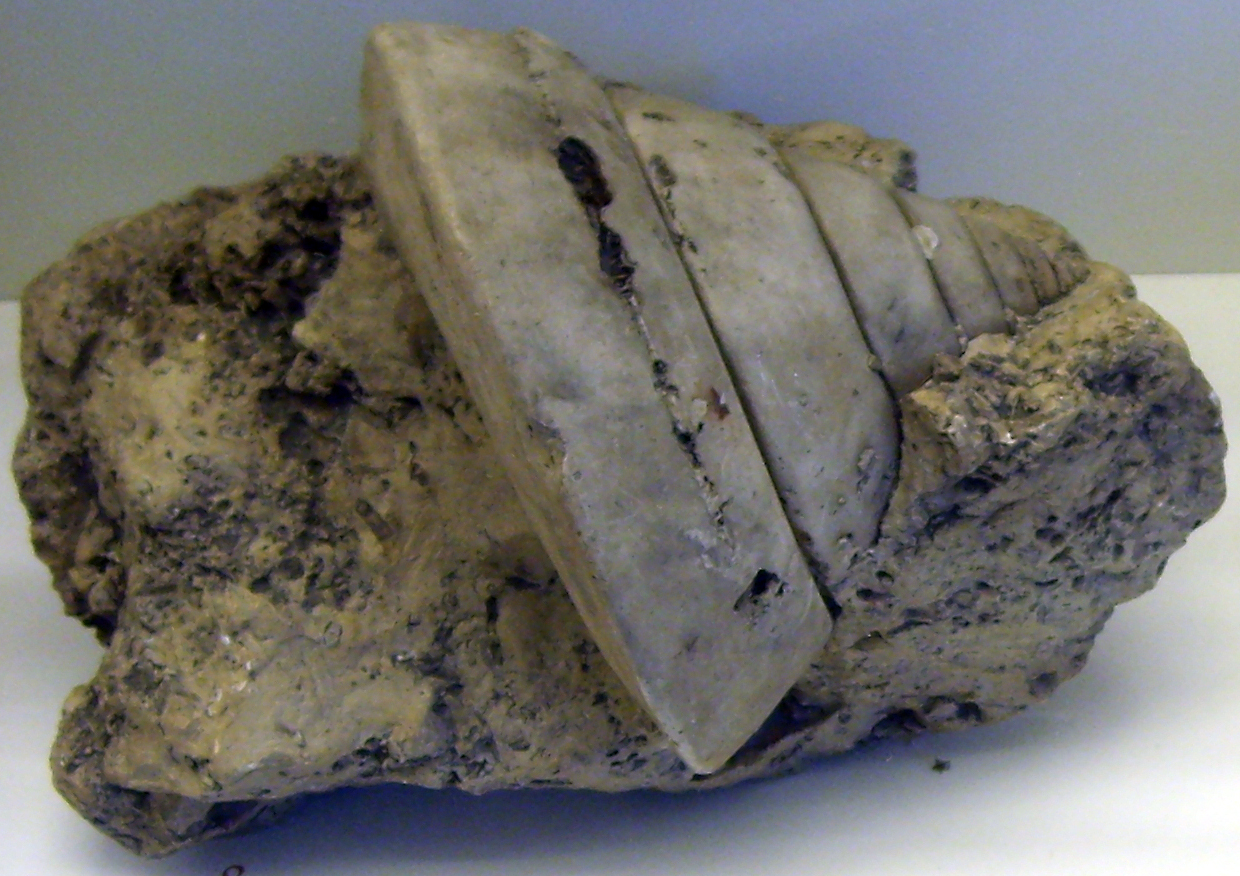
- Pleurotomaria niloticiformes fossil at the Geological Museum in Copenhagen

Scientific classification
- Kingdom: Animalia
- Phylum: Mollusca
- Class: Gastropoda
- Subclass: Vetigastropoda
- Order: Pleurotomariida
- Superfamily: Pleurotomarioidea
- Family: Pleurotomariidae
- Genus: †Pleurotomaria; Defrance, 1826

Type species
- † Trochus anglicus J. Sowerby, 1818

= Pleurotomaria =

Pleurotomaria Temporal range: Middle Triassic-Cretaceous

Extinct genus of gastropods

Pleurotomaria is an extinct genus of sea snails, marine gastropod molluscs in the family Pleurotomariidae.

== Species ==
With current taxonomic changes the genus Pleurotomaria has been reserved exclusively for fossil species (denoted with † below).
Known fossil species of Pleurotomaria include:

- † Pleurotomaria actinomphala Eudes-Deslongchamps, 1848
- † Pleurotomaria agarista Billings, 1865
- † Pleurotomaria anglica (Sowerby, 1818) (synonym: Trochus anglicus)
- † Pleurotomaria angulosa d'Orbigny, 1842
- † Pleurotomaria antitorquata Münster, 1840
- † Pleurotomaria arctica Toula, 1875
- † Pleurotomaria arenaria Girty, 1908
- † Pleurotomaria armata Münster in Goldfuss, 1844
- † Pleurotomaria awakinoensis Begg and Grant-Mackie, 2003
- † Pleurotomaria bajociana Ferrari & Damborenea, 2015
- † Pleurotomaria barrealensis (Cowper Reed, 1927) (synonym: Neoplatyteichum barrealensis)
- † Pleurotomaria baugieri d’Orbigny, 1847
- † Pleurotomaria bicoronata Sandberger and Sandberger, 1855
- † Pleurotomaria biondii Gemmellaro, 1889
- † Pleurotomaria bodana Roemer, 1855
- † Pleurotomaria brennensis Reed, 1932
- † Pleurotomaria calcifera Billings, 1859
- † Pleurotomaria cancellata Stauffer, 1909
- † Pleurotomaria carinifera Girty, 1908
- † Pleurotomaria catherinae Gemmellaro, 1889
- † Pleurotomaria cingulata Goldfuss, 1844
- † Pleurotomaria coheni Gemmellaro, 1889
- † Pleurotomaria comata Lindström, 1884
- † Pleurotomaria coniformis de Koninck, 1883
- † Pleurotomaria costulatocanaliculata Sandberger and Sandberger, 1853
- † Pleurotomaria discoidea Girty, 1908
- † Pleurotomaria doris Hall, 1862
- † Pleurotomaria elderi Girty, 1908
- † Pleurotomaria estella Hall and Whitfield, 1872
- † Pleurotomaria exaltata d’Archiac and de Verneuil, 1842
- † Pleurotomaria faberi Monari & Gatto, 2013
- † Pleurotomaria gracilis Phillips, 1841
- † Pleurotomaria halliana Shumard, 1859
- † Pleurotomaria hectori (Trechmann, 1918) (synonym: Pleurotomaria (Sisenna) hectori)
- † Pleurotomaria helicoides Cowper Reed, 1901
- † Pleurotomaria hisingeri Goldfuss, 1864
- † Pleurotomaria hokonuiensis Trechmann, 1918
- † Pleurotomaria? homoruspira Szabó, 2017
- † Pleurotomaria hyale Billings, 1865
- † Pleurotomaria indistincta Szabó, 2017
- † Pleurotomaria isaacsii Hall and Whitfield, 1873
- † Pleurotomaria isomorpha Gemmellaro, 1889
- † Pleurotomaria karetai Begg and Grant-Mackie, 2003
- † Pleurotomaria kiritehereensis Begg and Grant-Mackie, 2003
- † Pleurotomaria? laponya Szabó, 2017
- † Pleurotomaria mariani Gemmellaro, 1889
- † Pleurotomaria mazarensis Gemmellaro, 1889
- † Pleurotomaria mica Girty, 1908
- † Pleurotomaria monilifera Terquem and Jourdy, 1873
- † Pleurotomaria murchisoniaeformis Gemmellaro, 1889
- † Pleurotomaria neglecta Girty, 1908
- † Pleurotomaria nikitini Fliegel, 1901
- † Pleurotomaria nodulocincta Szabó, 2017
- † Pleurotomaria nodulocostulata Szabó, 2017
- † Pleurotomaria nongradata Szabó, 2017
- † Pleurotomaria notlingi Koken, 1896
- † Pleurotomaria nuda Delpey, 1941
- † Pleurotomaria obliqua Fliegel, 1901
- † Pleurotomaria okensis Gerasimov, 1992
- † Pleurotomaria ornatadepressa Hudleston, 1895
- † Pleurotomaria otapiriensis Begg and Grant-Mackie, 2003
- † Pleurotomaria perfasciata Hall, 1860
- † Pleurotomaria pericarinata (Hall, 1847) (synonyms: Cyclonema pericarinata, Gyronema pericarinatum)
- † Pleurotomaria perornata Shumard, 1859
- † Pleurotomaria perversa Whidborne, 1889
- † Pleurotomaria? plana Ferrari, 2024
- † Pleurotomaria planulata Girty, 1908
- † Pleurotomaria plicifera d'Eichwald, 1860
- † Pleurotomaria pogibshiensis Ferrari et al., 2020
- † Pleurotomaria postumia Billings, 1865
- † Pleurotomaria proutiana Shumard, 1859
- † Pleurotomaria psiche Gemmellaro, 1889
- † Pleurotomaria putilla Girty, 1908
- † Pleurotomaria replicata Lindström, 1884
- † Pleurotomaria retroplicata Gemmellaro, 1889
- † Pleurotomaria richardsoni Girty, 1908
- † Pleurotomaria roemeri (Koken, 1889) (synonym: Euryzone roemeri)
- † Pleurotomaria rouillieri d'Orbigny, 1850 (syn P. trochus)
- † Pleurotomaria salomonensis Gemmellaro, 1889
- † Pleurotomaria seminodosa Szabó, 2017
- † Pleurotomaria sigaretus Sandberger and Sandberger, 1855
- † Pleurotomaria spilsbyensis Cox, 1960
- † Pleurotomaria striatissima Cowper Reed, 1901
- † Pleurotomaria subsulcata Goldfuss, 1844
- † Pleurotomaria subtilistriata Hall, 1847
- † Pleurotomaria trinchesii Gemmellaro, 1889
- † Pleurotomaria? trochotomorpha Ferrari, 2024
- † Pleurotomaria tunstallensis King, 1848
- † Pleurotomaria viola Billings, 1865
- † Pleurotomaria virgo Billings, 1865
- † Pleurotomaria waimumu Begg and Grant-Mackie, 2003
- † Pleurotomaria wiesberghausensis Szabó, 2017
- † Pleurotomaria wurmi Römer, 1843
- † Pleurotomaria zitteli Holzapfel, 1882

=== Species brought into synonymy ===
- Pleurotomaria adansoniana Crosse & Fischer, 1861: synonym of Entemnotrochus adansonianus (Crosse & Fischer, 1861)
- Pleurotomaria africana Tomlin, 1948: synonym of Bayerotrochus africanus (Tomlin, 1948)
- † Pleurotomaria ajax d'Orbigny, 1850: synonym of Trapanimaria somhegyensis (Szabó, 1980)
- † Pleurotomaria alba Queenstedt, 1857: synonym of Trapanimaria alba (Queenstedt, 1857)
- † Pleurotomaria aspera J. de C. Sowerby in Sedgwick & Murchison, 1840.: synonym of Paragoniozona aspera (J. de C. Sowerby in Sedgwick & Murchison, 1840).
- † Pleurotomaria aspera Girty, 1934 [non Pleurotomaria aspera J. de C. Sowerby in Sedgwick & Murchison, 1840]: synonym of Paragoniozona ornata Karapunar, et al., 2022
- † Pleurotomaria beckwithana McChesney, 1859: synonym of Shansiella beckwithana (McChesney, 1859)
- †Pleurotomaria beyrichii Hilgendorf, 1877: synonym of Mikadotrochus beyrichii (Hilgendorf, 1877)
- † Pleurotomaria bitorquata Eudes-Deslongchamps, 1849: synonym of † Pyrgotrochus bitorquata (Eudes-Deslongchamps, 1849)
- † Pleurotomaria brazoensis Shumard, 1860: synonym of Phymatopleura brazoensis (Shumard, 1860)
- † Pleurotomaria carbonaria Norwood & Pratten, 1855: synonym of Shansiella carbonaria (Norwood & Pratten, 1855)
- † Pleurotomaria concava Hall, 1858 [non Pleurotomaria concava Deshayes, 1832]: synonym of Pleurotomaria tenuimarginata Hall in Miller, 1877: synonym of Eotrochus tenuimarginatus (Hall in Miller, 1877)
- † Pleurotomaria depressa Cox, 1857 [non Pleurotomaria depressa Phillips, 1836].: synonym of Pleurotomaria kentuckiensis Miller, 1889: synonym of Trepospira depressa (Cox, 1857)
- † Pleurotomaria eudora d'Orbigny, 1860 : synonym to Trapanimaria eudora (d'Orbigny, 1860)
- † Pleurotomaria giffordi Worthen, 1884: synonym of Yvania giffordi (Worthen, 1884): synonym of Baylea giffordi (Worthen, 1884)
- † Pleurotomaria grayvillensis Norwood & Pratten, 1855: synonym of Phanerotrema grayvillense (Norwood & Pratten, 1855): synonym of Glabrocingulum grayvillense (Norwood & Pratten, 1855)
- † Pleurotomaria gurleyi Meek, 1871: synonym of Yvania gurleyi (Meek, 1871): synonym of Baylea gurleyi (Meek, 1871)
- Pleurotomaria hirasei Pilsbry, 1903: synonym of Mikadotrochus hirasei (Pilsbry, 1903)
- † Pleurotomaria humboldtii Buch, 1839: synonym of † Lithotrochus humboldtii (Buch, 1839)
- † Pleurotomaria illinoiensis Worthen, 1884: synonym of † Trepospira illinoisensis (Worth, 1884): sometimes considered a synonym of Trepospira depressa (Cox, 1857)
- † Pleurotomaria marcouiana Geinitz, 1866: synonym of † Glabrocingulum marcouianum (Geinitz, 1866)
- † Pleurotomaria michelottii: synonym of † Trapanimaria? pallinii Szabó et al., 2019
- † Pleurotomaria millegranosa Girty, 1934: synonym of † Paragoniozona millegranosa (Girty, 1934)
- † Pleurotomaria neosolodurina Dacque, 1905: synonym of † Trapanimaria neosolodurina (Dacque, 1905)
- † Pleurotomaria penultima d'Orbigny, 1850: synonym of † Leptomaria penultima (d'Orbigny, 1850) (original combination)
- † Pleurotomaria peresii d'Orbigny, 1850: synonym of † Leptomaria peresii (d'Orbigny, 1850) (original combination)
- † "Pleurotomaria" perlata Hall, 1852: synonym of Isfarispira perlata (Hall, 1852)
- Pleurotomaria quoyana Fischer & Bernardi, 1856: synonym of Perotrochus quoyanus quoyanus (Fischer & Bernardi, 1856)
- Pleurotomaria rumphii Schepman, 1879: synonym of Entemnotrochus rumphii (Schepman, 1879)
- Pleurotomaria salmiana Rolle, 1899: synonym of Mikadotrochus salmianus (Rolle, 1899)
- † Pleurotomaria scalaris Münster, 1841: synonym of † Schizogonium scalare (Münster, 1841) (original combination)
- † Pleurotomaria scitula Meek & Worthen, 1861: synonym of † Dictyotomaria scitula (Meek & Worthen, 1861)
- † Pleurotomaria sorlinensis Loriol, 1903: synonym of † Pyrgotrochus vorosi Szabó et al., 2019
- † Pleurotomaria speciosa Meek & Worthen, 1861: synonym of † Worthenia speciosa (Meek & Worthen, 1861)
- † Pleurotomaria sphaerulata Conrad, 1842: synonym of † Trepospira sphaerulata (Conrad, 1842)
- † Pleurotomaria spilsbiensis Cox, 1960: synonym of †Pleurotomaria spilsbyensis Cox, 1960 (incorrect subsequent spelling of the species epithet)
- † Pleurotomaria spironema Meek & Worthen, 1866 : synonym of † Globodoma spironema (Meek & Worthen, 1866): synonym of † Nemaspira spironema (Meek & Worthen, 1866) (basionym)
- † Pleurotomaria squamula Phillips, 1836: synonym of † Eirlysella squamula (Phillips, 1836)
- † Pleurotomaria subcancellata d´Orbigny, 1850: synonym of † Dictyotomaria subcancellata (d´Orbigny, 1850): synonym of † Cancellotomaria subcancellata (d´Orbigny, 1850)
- † Pleurotomaria subdecorata Münster, 1866: synonym of † Trapanimaria polymorpha Szabó et al., 2019
- † Pleurotomaria subdecussata Geinitz, 1866: synonym of † Phymatopleura brazoensis (Shumard, 1860)
- †Pleurotomaria subglobosa Hall in Miller, 1877: synonym of † Nemaspira subglobosa (Hall in Miller, 1877) (basionym)
- † Pleurotomaria subornata Münster, 1844: synonym of † Bathrotomaria subornata (Münster, 1844): synonym of † Szabotomaria subornata (Münster, 1844)
- †Pleurotomaria subpenea Netschaev, 1894: synonym of † Baylea subpenea (Netschaev, 1894) (basionym)
- † Pleurotomaria syssollae Keyserling, 1846: synonym of † Bathrotomaria syssollae (Keyserling, 1846) (basionym)
- † Pleurotomaria thouetensis (Hébert & Deslongschamps, 1860): synonym of † Amphitrochus thouetensis (Hébert & Deslongschamps, 1860) (superseded combination)
- † Pleurotomaria trilineata Hall, 1858: synonym of † Platyzona trilineata (Hall, 1858)
- † Pleurotomaria turbiniformis Meek & Worthen, 1861: synonym of † Euconospira turbiniformis (Meek & Worthen, 1861)
- † Pleurotomaria undulata Roemer, 1843: synonym of † Humboldtiella undulata (Roemer, 1843) (original combination)
- † Pleurotomaria uniangulata Hall, 1845: synonym of † Viviparus uniangulatus (Hall, 1845) (new combination)
- Pleurotomaria westralis Whitehead, 1987: synonym of Bayerotrochus westralis (Whitehead, 1987)
- † Pleurotomaria woodsi Wilckens, 1922: synonym of † Chelotia woodsi (Wilckens, 1922)
