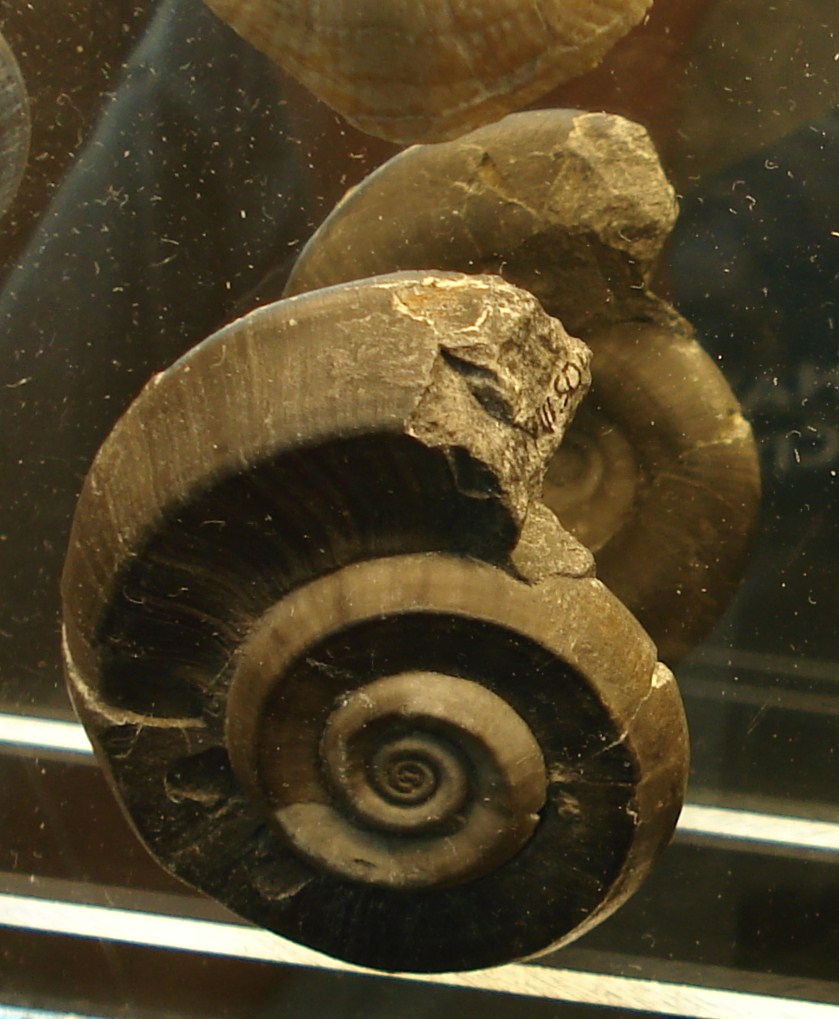

Scientific classification
- Kingdom: Animalia
- Phylum: Mollusca
- Class: Gastropoda
- Order: Archaeogastropoda
- Suborder: †Euomphalina de Koninck 1881

Superfamilies
- Euomphaloidea; Macluritoidea; Ophiletoidea; Platyceratoidea

Synonyms
- Macluritina Cox and Knight 1960

= Euomphalina =

Euomphalina Temporal range: Upper Cambrian–Triassic

Suborder of molluscs

The Euomphalina comprise a major suborder of mainly Paleozoic archaeogastropods, shells of which are hyperstrophic to depressed orthostrophic, commonly with an angulation at the outer upper whorl surface thought to be coincident with the exhalent channel; shell wall thick, outer layer calcitic, inner layers aragonitic but not nacreous; operculum calcareous and heavy. Their range is from the Upper Cambrian to the Triassic, and possibly as high as the Upper Cretaceous.

The suborder Euomphalina de Koninck 1881 is synonymous with Macluritina (Cox and Knight 1960).

The suborder Euomphalina includes the extinct superfamilies Euomphaloidea, Macluritoidea, Ophiletoidea, and Platyceratoidea.

== Taxonomy ==
J.B. Knight et al 1960, in the Treatise Part I recognize two superfamilies in the Euomphalina (or Macluritina), the Macluritoidea and the Euomphaloidea, in modified spelling.

More recent classifications have expanded the Euomphalina to include the superfamilies:

Anomphaloidea
Craspidostomatoidea
Ophiletoidea
Oriostomatoidea
Palaeotrochoidea
Platyceratoidea and
Pseudophoroidea
while retaining the original Euomphaloidea and Macluritoidea.

The Ophiletoidea were separated from the family Helicotomidae of the Euomphaloidea (Euomphalatacea in the original form). The Oriostomatoidea and Platyceratoidea (in—acea form) are included in the suborder Trochina in the Treatise while (ibid) the Craspidostomatoidea, Palaeotrochoidea, and Pseudophoroidea (also as—acea taxa) are regarded simply as Archaeogastropoda of uncertain affinities.

P. Jeffery 2003 includes the Euomphaloidea, Macluritoidea, and Playceratacea in the Euomphalina while P. J. Wagner, 1999 included the Anomphaloidea, Euomphaloidea, Ophiletoidea, Oriostomatoidea, and Pseudophoroidea.

The taxonomy of Bouchet and Rocroi, 2005 includes the superfamilies Euomphaloidea and Maclurioidea within mollusca with anisotropically coiled shells of uncertain position (Gastropoda?) but does not give higher taxa such as orders and suborders. The taxonomy of Ponder and Lindberg, 1997 on the other hand is more expansive and includes the Euomphalina as the order Euomphalida within the Eogastropoda, but adding only the Platyceratoidea to the Euomphaloidea and Macluritoidea.
