= Anomphalidae =

Anomphalidae Temporal range: Silurian–Middle Permian

Scientific classification
- Kingdom: Animalia
- Phylum: Mollusca
- Class: Gastropoda
- Subclass: Vetigastropoda
- Order: Trochida
- Superfamily: Trochoidea
- Family: †Anomphalidae; Wenz, 1938

Genera
- See text

Extinct family of gastropods

The Anomphalidae is an extinct family of fossil sea snails, marine gastropod mollusks. These are archaeogastropods which are included in the suborder Trochina. The Anomphalidae lived during the Paleozoic, from the Silurian to the Middle Permian. According to some authorities these snails belong instead to the Euomphalacea.

== Morphologic diagnosis ==
Shells of the Anomphalidae are rounded, almost discoidal, low-spired trochospiral inform, possibly with a globular body whorl. The aperture is oval, without exhalent slit or crease. The umbilicus is narrow, open or closed. The inner shell layer is seemingly nacreous. The shell surface is generally smooth, ornamentation consisting of fine transverse lyrae or growth lines parallel to the aperture lip.

The Anomphalidae differ from the Euomphalcea to which they have been reassigned in being more trochoidal, in lacking the angulation on the upper whorl surface characteristic of Euomphalacea, and in having the inner shell layer seemingly nacreous. (The inner shell layers of the Euomphalacea may be of laminar aragonite, but are never nacreous.) The Anomphalidea differ from the Pleurotomariacea in lacking the often deep slit or selenizone, which is characteristic of that taxon.

== Taxonomy ==
J Brooks Knight, et al, in the Treatise, 1960, assigned 10 genera to the Annomphalidae. They are

Anomphalus Meek and Worthen 1866, the type genus
Cycloscena Fletcher 1958
Eiselia Dietz 1911
Isonema Meek and Worthen 1866
Pycnomphalus Lindström 1884
Turbocheilus Perner 1907
Sosiolytes Gemmellaro 1889
Straparella Fischer 1885
Turbinilopsis de Koninck 1881
Tychonia de Koninck 1881

At present the Anompalideae has been expanded to include 17 genera in two subfamilies established by Peel, 1984.

Added to Anomphalus, Cycloscena, Eiselia, and Isonema in the Anomphalinae are:
Antirotiela Cossmann 1918, given in the Treatise as a synonym for Anomphalus

Frydacosta Cook and Nützel 2005
Delphinuella Heidelberger 2001
Givediscus Heidelberger 2001
Littorella Heidelberger 2001
Nodinella Heidelberger 2001

Contained within the Pycnomphalinae in addition to Pycnomphalus, Turbocheilus, Sosiolites, Strapariella, and Tychonia:

Pycnotrochus Perner 1903
Turbinilopsis de Koninck 1881

Pycnotrochus, from the Upper Silurian of Europe, was removed from the Sinuopeidae (Pleurotomariacea); the lip has a sinus more characteristic of the original family. Turbinopsis, from the Lower Devonian of North America, was removed from the Palaeotrochidae (Palaeotrochacea); has a spiral chord not found on typical Anomphalidae and an aperture with a thicker, wider lip, also atypical.

Bouchet & Rocroi, 2005 simply included the Anomphalidae in "basal taxa that are certainly Gastropoda".
