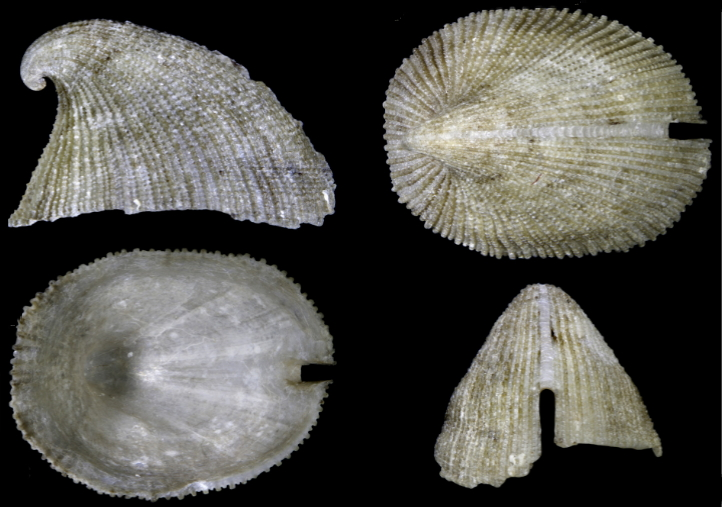
- Shell of Emarginula retrogyra (holotype)

Scientific classification
- Kingdom: Animalia
- Phylum: Mollusca
- Class: Gastropoda
- Subclass: Vetigastropoda
- Order: Lepetellida
- Family: Fissurellidae
- Subfamily: Emarginulinae
- Genus: Emarginula
- Species: E. retrogyra

Binomial name
- Emarginula retrogyra D. G. Herbert, 2024

= Emarginula retrogyra =

Species of gastropod

Emarginula retrogyra is a species of sea snail, a marine gastropod mollusk in the family Fissurellidae, the keyhole limpets and slit limpets.

== Description ==
(Original description) Dimensions: Holotype, base 10.5 × 8.1 mm, height 6.7 mm (= largest specimen).

Shell: Small and thin (basal length up to 10.5 mm); relatively high (H/L ± 0.64). The anterior slope is convex, but not strongly so and the apex is not extending over the posterior margin of the base. The tip of the apex is nonetheless strongly recurved. The basal outline is evenly ovate (Length/Depth ± 1.3), slightly concave in side view. The anterior face is not flattened. The posterior slope is for the most part straight, becoming strongly concave beneath the recurved apex. The protoconch is tucked under the recurved apex, but largely remains free of the ascending posterior face of teleoconch, due to a strong apical recurvature. The anterior slit is moderately deep, approx. one-third of the anterior slope. The margins of the selenizone are distinctly elevated, but thin and mostly broken away in the holotype, but partially remaining in paratypes. The selenizone itself is not raised, bearing coarse, evenly-spaced lunulae. These become more numerous and more close-set nearer to the slit. The remaining sculpture consists of fine, close-set radial ribs, of which approx. 22 are primary with secondary and tertiary intermediaries between them. The primary and secondary ribs are more or less equal in size at the shell margin, tertiaries are usually slightly weaker. The intervals between the ribs are narrow, but well-defined. The concentric sculpture consists of fine, close-set ridges. These are weaker and not as markedly raised as the radial ribs. The ridges cross the ribs rendering the latter crisply nodular. The interstices between ribs and ridges are deep, quadrate, simple, with one or a pair of intritacalx pits. The basal margin is mostly damaged in the holotype, but evidently finely crenulated at ends of radial ribs with shallow grooves on the interior, underlying radial ribs, longer and more evident in juveniles. The interior shows a broad ridge underlying the selenizone, approx. twice the length of the slit. The ridge itself has a shallow central furrow. The interior of the apex is scarcely visible due to extent of recurvature.

Protoconch: Typically emarginuliform. It consists of a single whorl with thickened terminal varix; rotated 90° further with regard to teleoconch such that varix is parallel with the plane of the shell aperture; surface with sparse superficial granulation; maximum diameter ± 180 μm.

Colour: Holotype rather dirty pale olive-brown, but fresher specimens show broad, darker greenish-brown concentric bands and occasional greenish-brown spots.

== Distribution ==
This marine species occurs on the Walters Shoals, a group of submerged mountains off the coast of Madagascar.
