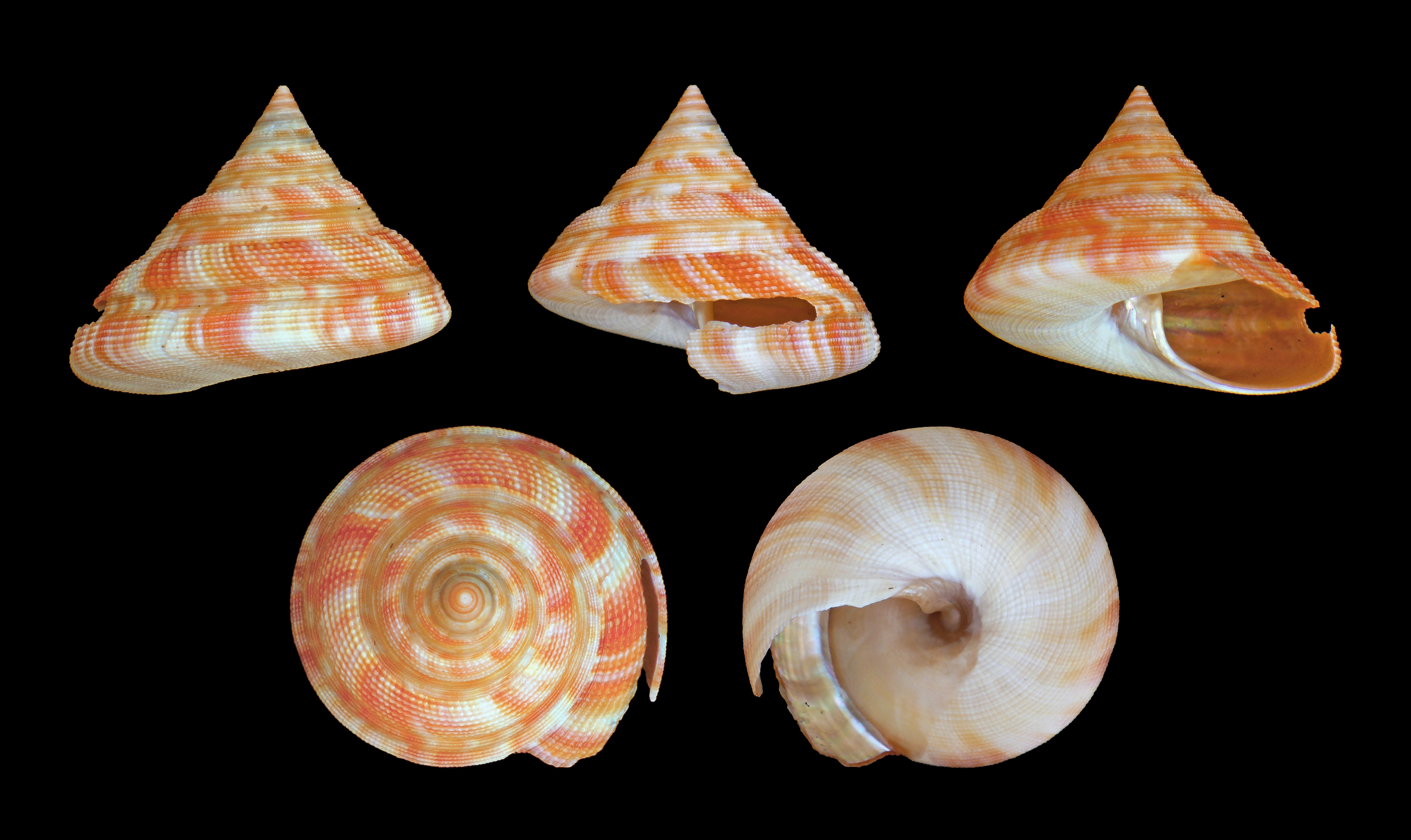
- Five views of a shell of Mikadotrochus hirasei

Scientific classification
- Kingdom: Animalia
- Phylum: Mollusca
- Class: Gastropoda
- Subclass: Vetigastropoda
- Order: Pleurotomariida
- Superfamily: Pleurotomarioidea
- Family: Pleurotomariidae
- Genus: Mikadotrochus; Lindholm, 1927

Type species
- Pleurotomaria beyrichii Hilgendorf, 1877

Synonyms
- Pleurotomaria (Mikadotrochus) Lindholm, 1927 (original rank)

= Mikadotrochus =

Mikadotrochus Temporal range: Lower Pliocene to Recent

Genus of gastropods

Mikadotrochus is a genus of sea snails, marine gastropod mollusks in the family Pleurotomariidae, the slit snails.

== Species ==
Species within the genus Mikadotrochus include:

- Mikadotrochus beyrichii (Hilgendorf, 1877)
- Mikadotrochus gotoi (Anseeuw, 1990)
- Mikadotrochus hirasei hirasei (Pilsbry, 1903)
  - Mikadotrochus hirasei yamamotoi (A. Yamamoto, 1993), Species inquirenda
- Mikadotrochus mikadotrochus Pilsbry
- Mikadotrochus salmianus (Rolle, 1887)
- Mikadotrochus nantoensisLin，1975:

Species brought into synonymy

- Mikadotrochus amabilis Bayer, 1963: synonym of Perotrochus amabilis (Bayer, 1963)
- Mikadotrochus anseeuwi Kanazawa & Y. Goto, 1991: synonym of Perotrochus anseeuwi Kanazawa & Y. Goto, 1991
- Mikadotrochus caledonicus (Bouchet & Métivier, 1982): synonym of Perotrochus caledonicus Bouchet & Métivier, 1982
- Mikadotrochus deforgesi B. Métivier, 1990: synonym of Perotrochus deforgesi Métivier, 1990
- Mikadotrochus oishii T. Shikama, 1973: synonym of Perotrochus oishii (Shikama, 1973)
- Mikadotrochus schmalzi T. Shikama, 1961: synonym of Mikadotrochus salmianus (Rolle, 1899)
