= Raphistomatidae =

Raphistomatidae Temporal range: U Cambrian - M Permian

Scientific classification
- Kingdom: Animalia
- Phylum: Mollusca
- Class: Gastropoda
- Subclass: incertae sedis
- Family: †Raphistomatidae; Koken, 1896

Subfamilies
- See text

Synonyms
- Ceratopeidae Yochelson & Bridge, 1957

Family of gastropods

The †Raphistomatidae is a taxonomic family of fossil sea snails, Paleozoic marine gastropod molluscs. This family was established by Koken in 1896. This family is found in the fossil record from the Upper Cambrian to the Middle Permian.

== Description ==
The shells of the snails in this family are lenticular, turbiniform, and stepped, with a short slit, notch, or sinus on the aperture lip that generally results in a selenizone.

== Subfamilies ==
J. Brooks Knight, et al. in the Treatise Part 1, 1960, included the Raphistomatidae in the Pleurotomariacea and subdivided the family into four subfamilies described herein.

- Opheletinae, Knight, 1956 – generally low spired with a wide umbilicus and V-shaped labral sinus ending at the periphery in a short notch that generates an obscure selenizone. U Camb - L Ord
- Raphistomatinae, Koken, 1896 – consists of shells commonly with a narrow protruding base and more or less flattened upper surface and a deep v-shaped labral sinus in most species ending in a shallow notch at the end of a peripheral selenezone. M Ord - ?L Carb
- Liospirinae, Knight, 1956 – has lenticular shells with a moderately deep V-shaped sinus resulting in a short slit that generates a convex selenizone found mostly, or entirely, on the upper side. ?L ord - M Perm
- Omospitinae, Wenz, 1958 – contains gradate, that is stepped shells with a ramp and a relatively wide, shallow sinus or labral slit resulting in a selenizone just within the outer margin of the ramp. M Ord- L Jur (note, range inconsistent with that given for the family)

Jeffery, 2003, included the Raphistomatidae in the Euomphaloidea (=Euomphalacea). The subfamilies Opheletinae and Raphistomatinae are retained, but the Lionsprinae and Omospirinae have been reassigned to the Eotomaridae and Loxonematidae, respectively.

In the perspective of Bouchet and Rocroi, 2005 the Raphistomatidae is simply included in "Basal taxa that are certainly Gastropoda" without assigning it to any higher taxa.
