= Mikadotrochus gotoi =

Scientific classification
- Kingdom: Animalia
- Phylum: Mollusca
- Class: Gastropoda
- Subclass: Vetigastropoda
- Order: Pleurotomariida
- Superfamily: Pleurotomarioidea
- Family: Pleurotomariidae
- Genus: Mikadotrochus
- Species: M. gotoi

Binomial name
- Mikadotrochus gotoi (Anseeuw, 1990)

Synonyms
- Perotrochus gotoi Anseeuw, 1990

Species of gastropod

Mikadotrochus gotoi is a species of large sea snail, a marine gastropod mollusk in the family Pleurotomariidae, the slit snails.

== Description ==
The length of the shell varies between 40 mm and 62 mm.

== Distribution ==
This marine species occurs on the continental slope off the Philippines.
