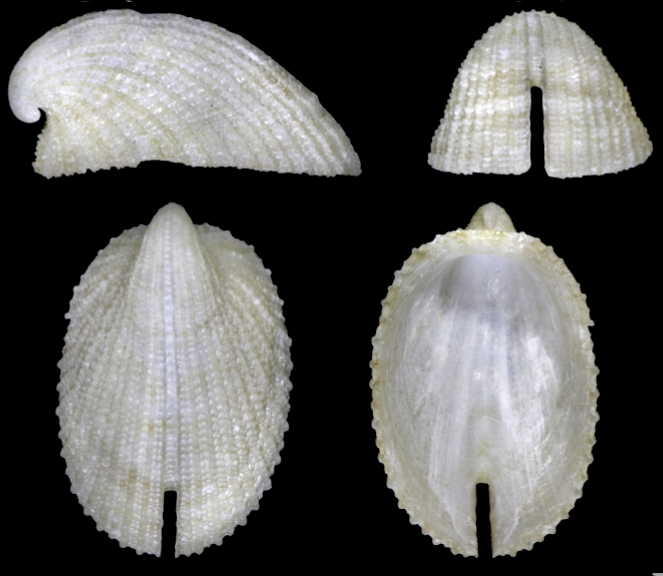
- Shell of Emarginula lentiginosa (holotype)

Scientific classification
- Kingdom: Animalia
- Phylum: Mollusca
- Class: Gastropoda
- Subclass: Vetigastropoda
- Order: Lepetellida
- Family: Fissurellidae
- Subfamily: Emarginulinae
- Genus: Emarginula
- Species: E. lentiginosa

Binomial name
- Emarginula lentiginosa D. G. Herbert, 2024

= Emarginula lentiginosa =

Species of gastropod

Emarginula lentiginosa is a species of sea snail, a marine gastropod mollusk in the family Fissurellidae, the keyhole limpets and slit limpets.

== Description ==
(Original description) Dimensions: holotype, base 8.4 × 5.8 mm, height 4.3 mm (= largest specimen)

Shell: Small (basal length up to 6.0 mm), strongly recurved with the apex extending well beyond the posterior margin of the base. The basal outline is broadly ovate (Length/Width ratio ~1.45) and appears slightly concave in side view, with moderate height (Height/Length ratio 0.51–0.57). The anterior slope is strongly convex, while the posterior slope is concave. The anterior slit is moderately deep, measuring 0.25–0.33 of the anterior slope's length. The selenizone initially forms a low mid-line rib with minimally raised margins, which become more elevated with growth, though they are frequently damaged. The lunulae of the selenizone are moderately coarse and regular, and the final section of the selenizone is at most weakly sunken.

The remaining sculpture is cancellate, with approximately 16 primary radial ribs, accompanied by secondary and tertiary ribs. The radial ribs are intersected by concentric ridges similar in strength to the secondary ribs. Where these ribs and ridges intersect, rounded nodules form, resulting in a crisp, nearly square reticulation pattern. Each interstice contains a pair of radially elongate intritacalx pits, which often connect at the top and diverge at the base. The basal margin is unevenly crenulated due to the ends of the radial ribs. The interior rim around the anterior slit is thickened, extending apically as a broad, low mid-line ridge that matches the slit in length. In larger specimens, the interior of the recurved apex is scarcely visible, if at all.

Protoconch: Typically emarginuliform, with a single whorl and a thickened terminal varix. The surface is covered with a flocculated granulation, and the maximum diameter is approximately 165 μm.

Color: Fresh specimens are a pale buffish-white, with the recurved apex generally whiter. Radial ribs display small brown or olive-brown spots, which typically, though not always, alternate with unspotted ribs. The anterior face lacks broad color blotches. The holotype’s color pattern has faded with age.

== Distribution ==
This marine species occurs on the Walters Shoals, a group of submerged mountains off the coast of Madagascar.
