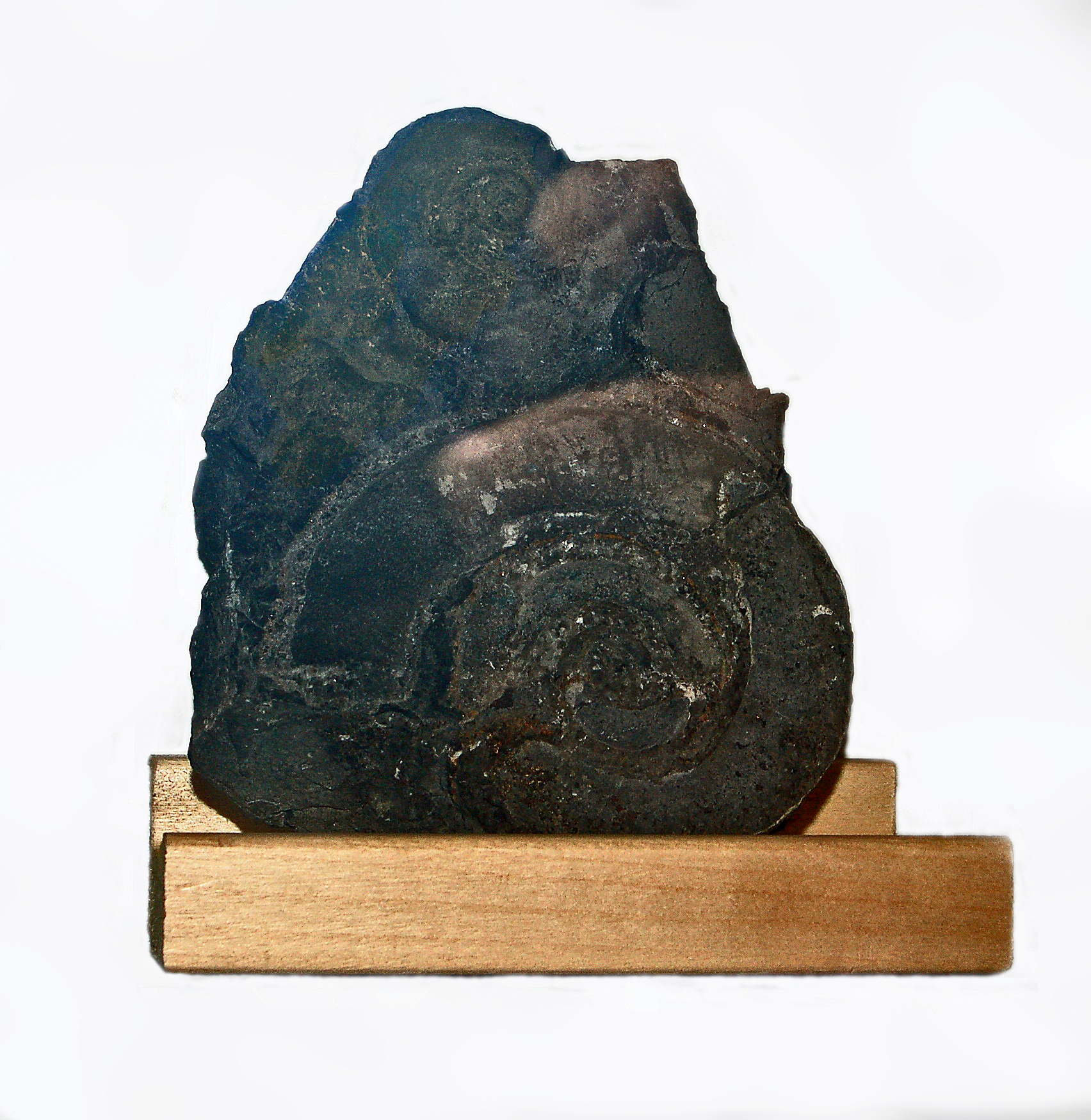
- Maclurites sp., Ordovician, Ohio (USA)

Scientific classification
- Kingdom: Animalia
- Phylum: Mollusca
- Class: Gastropoda
- Order: Archaeogastropoda
- Superfamily: †Macluritoidea
- Family: †Macluritidae; Carpenter, 1861

Genera
- See text

= Macluritidae =

Macluritidae Temporal range: Lower Ordovician – Devonian

Extinct family of gastropods

Macluritidae is an extinct family of relatively large, Lower Ordovician to Devonian, macluritacean gastropods, coiled, that is dextral while appearing sinistral, of which the genus Maclurites is arch-typical. The base of their shells is flat or gently protruding while the upper side is generally concave.

== Taxonomy ==
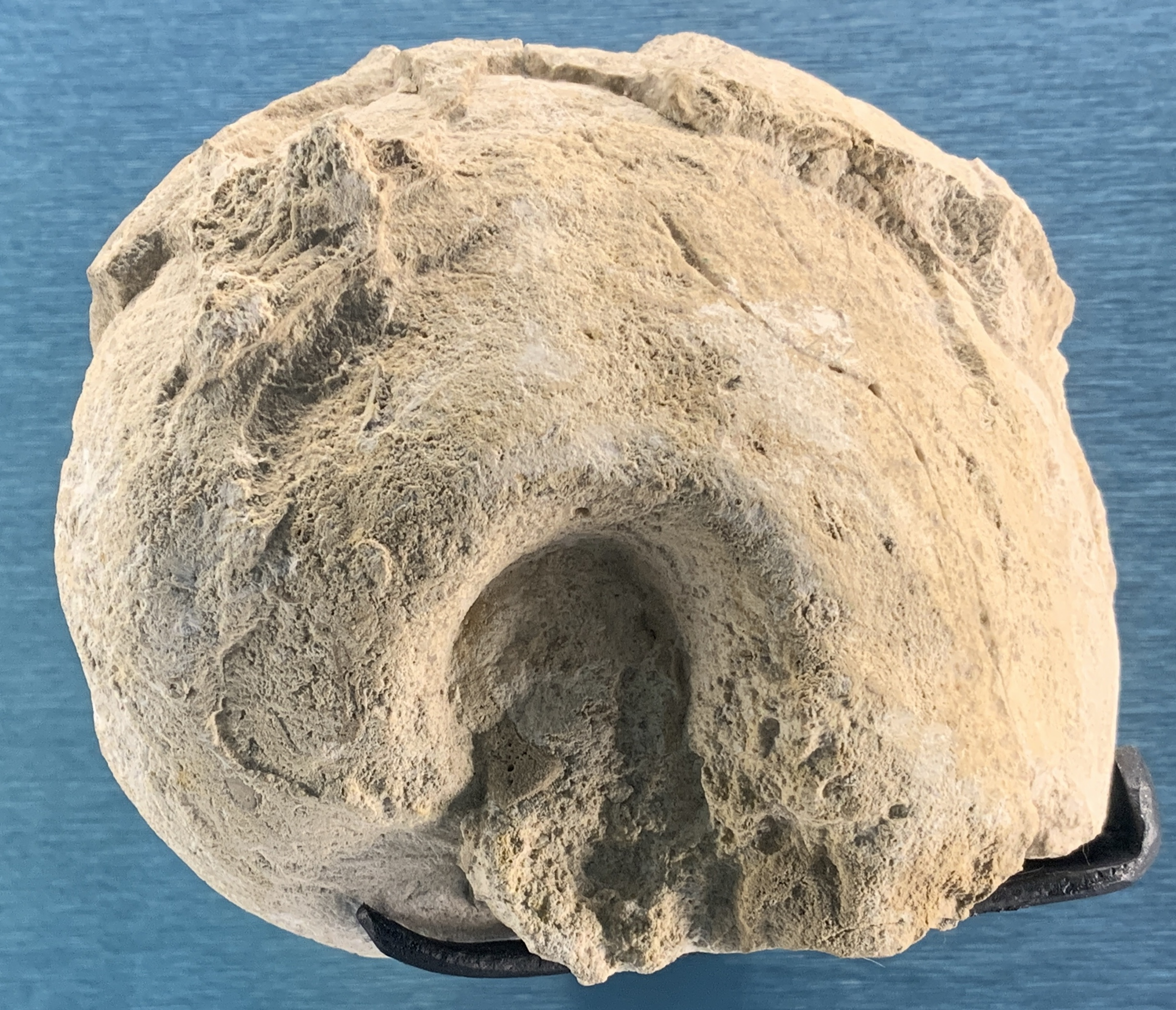
Maclurina manitobensis, late Ordovician, Red River Formation, Manitoba (Canada).

J.B Knight, et al., 1960 included the Macluritidae in the prosobranch Archeogastropoda and included the family in the Macluritacea. Linsely and Keir, 1984 removed the Macluritidae, along with the Onychochilidae, to the Paragastropoda, a new class of gastropod-like molluscs proposed for forms which they concluded had untorted bodies.

Bouchet & Rocroi, 2005, tentatively included the Macluritidae within the Gastropoda, placing them among Paleozoic molluscs with anisostrophically coiled shells of uncertain position (Gastropoda?) and within the superfamily Macluritoidea. This family has no subfamilies.

== Genera ==
Genera in the family Macluritidae include:

- Bridgeina
- Maclurina
- Macluritella - synonym: Prohelicotoma.
- Maclurites Lesueur, 1818 - type genus of the family Macluritidae - synonyms: Maclurea, Coelocentrus, Polyenaulus, Paramaclurites.
- Monitorella
- Palliseria
- Rousseauspira
- Scaevogyra
- Teiichispira
- Zhuozishanospira

== See also ==
- The Taxonomy of the Gastropoda (Bouchet & Rocroi, 2005)
