= Trochina =

Trochina Temporal range: L Ord - Rec

Scientific classification
- Kingdom: Animalia
- Phylum: Mollusca
- Class: Gastropoda
- Order: Archaeogastropoda
- Suborder: †Trochina; Cox & Knight, 1960

Suborder of molluscs

The Trochina is a taxon that is used by paleontologists. It is a suborder of primitive sea snails, marine gastropod mollusks.

== Description ==
These snails have mostly conically coiled shells in which the spire is typically low to moderate in height. More rarely the shell is discoidal in coiling. The outer lip simple. The internal layers of the shell are aragonitic and nacreous, in some species completely so. The operculum, where known, is calcareous or corneous, and spiral in structure.

== Taxonomy ==
J. Brookes Knight, et al., in the Treatise on Invertebrate Paleontology divided the Trochina into five superfamilies: the Anomphalacea, Microdomacea, Oriostomatacea, Platyceratacea, and Trochacea, based on stratigraphic occurrence and features of shell anatomy without trying to extrapolate from molecular data. The first four superfamilies are exclusively Paleozoic, although the Oriostomatacea may extend into the Triassic. The Trochacea extends from the Triassic into the Recent.

Members of the Trochina are included in the vetigastropods although originally by Knight et al. in the Treatise, they were considered to be a suborder within the Archaeogastropoda. While this earlier approach may differ from more recent attempts, and may be no more phylogenetically accurate, it does provide a useful scheme for studying this group of animals.

The taxonomy of Bouchet and Rocroi (2005) did not use Trochina at all and they considered Trochina as an available name.
