= Trochotomidae =

Scientific classification
- Kingdom: Animalia
- Phylum: Mollusca
- Class: Gastropoda
- Subclass: Vetigastropoda
- Order: Pleurotomariida
- Superfamily: Pleurotomarioidea
- Family: †Trochotomidae; Cox, 1960 (1934)

Synonyms
- Ditremariinae Haber, 1934

Extinct family of gastropods

Trochotomidae is an extinct family of fossil sea snails, marine gastropod molluscs in the superfamily Pleurotomarioidea (according to the taxonomy of the Gastropoda by Bouchet & Rocroi, 2005).

This family has no subfamilies.

== Genera ==
Genera within the family Trochotomidae include:

- Trochotoma, the type genus
