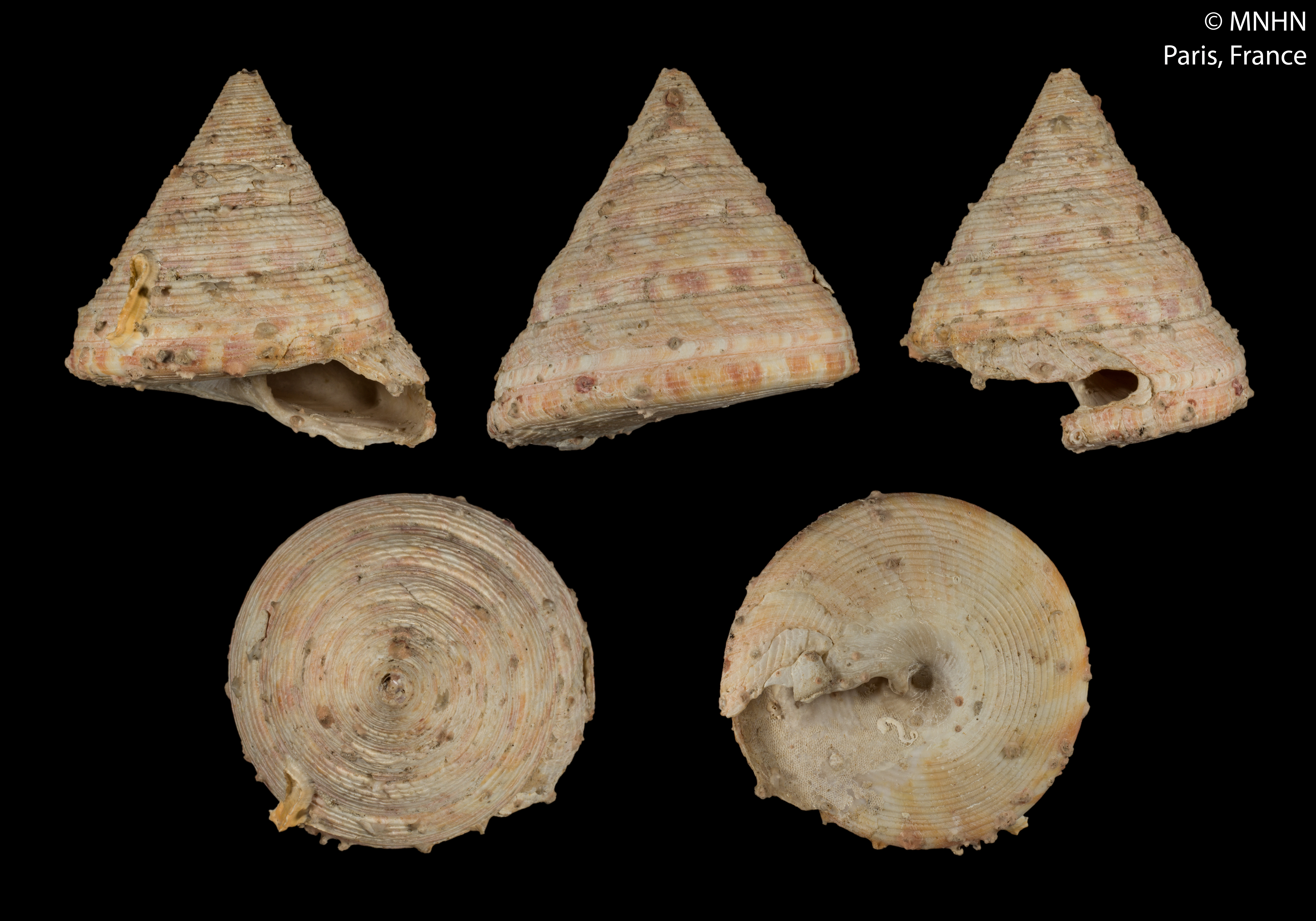
- Shell of Mikadotrochus salmianus neocaledonicus (paratype at MNHN. Paris)

Scientific classification
- Kingdom: Animalia
- Phylum: Mollusca
- Class: Gastropoda
- Subclass: Vetigastropoda
- Order: Pleurotomariida
- Superfamily: Pleurotomarioidea
- Family: Pleurotomariidae
- Genus: Mikadotrochus
- Species: M. salmianus

Binomial name
- Mikadotrochus salmianus (Rolle, 1899)

Synonyms
- Mikadotrochus schmalzi Shikama, 1961; Pleurotomaria salmiana Rolle, 1899

= Mikadotrochus salmianus =

Species of gastropod

Mikadotrochus salmianus, common name the Salmiana slit shell, is a species of large sea snail, a marine gastropod mollusk in the family Pleurotomariidae, the slit snails.

Subspecies

- Mikadotrochus salmianus neocaledonicus Anseeuw, 2016
- Mikadotrochus salmianus salmianus (Rolle, 1899)

== Description ==
The shell is broadly trochiform, almost conical in shape. The shell is false umbilicus and spirally twisted on all sides. The shell is off-white in color with blazed red spirals. It is almost exactly conical with a broken or flattened tip. It is surrounded on all sides with furrows or traces of growth.

== Distribution ==
This species occurs in the Pacific Ocean off Japan, Fiji Islands and the Philippines.
