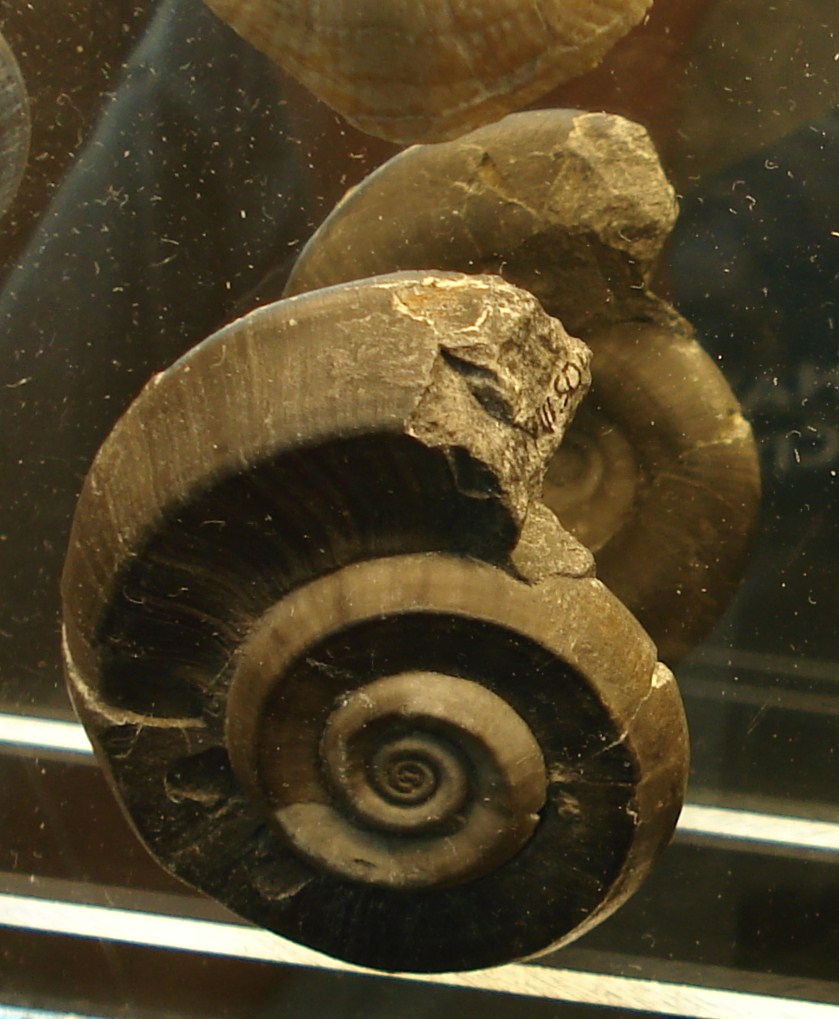
- A fossil shell of Euomphalus pentangulatus

Scientific classification
- Kingdom: Animalia
- Phylum: Mollusca
- Class: Gastropoda
- Subclass: incertae sedis
- Superfamily: †Euomphaloidea; C. A. White, 1877

= Euomphaloidea =

Euomphaloidea Temporal range: Lower Ordovician–Late Cretaceous

Extinct superfamily of gastropods

Euomphaloidea, originally Euomphalacea, is an extinct superfamily of marine molluscs that lived from the Early Ordovician to the Late Cretaceous, included in the Gastropoda but speculated as instead perhaps Monoplacophora.

== Description ==
Euomphaloid shells are mostly discoidal and may be either orthostrophic (coils wrapped around an erect cone) or hyperstrophic (coils wrapped around an inverted cone); are widely umbilicate and commonly have a channel, presumed exhalent, within the angulation in the outer part of the upper whorl surface. The shell wall is relatively thick, with an external prismatic layer of calcite, which may be pigmented, and an internal layer of lamellar, but not nacreous, aragonite.

== Taxonomy ==
As with almost all fossils, the taxonomic relations of and within the euophaloids can only be inferred from their remaining hard parts, in their case the shell. The general inclusion of the Euomphalacea, as originally spelled is based on the asymmetrically coiled tubular shell, suggestive if not indicative of the diagnostic torsion.

=== Taxonomy of the Treatise 1960 ===
J. Brooks Knight, et al, 1960, in the Treatise on Invertebrate Paleontology, Part I, included the Euomphalacea, as then used, in the suborder Macluritina, deriving them from the Macluritacea, and included the following three families.

Euomphalidae de Konick, 1881
Helicotomidae Wenz, 1938
Omphalotrochidae Knight, 1945

Prior to, R.C. Moore in 1952, included the Euomphalacea in the gastropod order Archaeogastropoda.

=== More recent taxonomies ===
The Euomphaloidea are included in the gastropod order Euomphalina, subclass Eogastropoda (revised Prosobranchia) according to Ponder & Lindberg (1997) Taxonomy of the Gastropoda (Ponder & Lindberg, 1997). This was accepted by Wagner, (2008) revised to include the following families.

Anomphalidae Wenz, 1938
Elasmonematidae Knight, 1956
Euomphalidae de Koninck, 1881
Helicotomidae Wenz, 1938
Holopeidae Wenz, 1938
Lesueurillidae Wagner, 1999
Microdomatidae Wenz, 1938
Omphalocirridae Wenz, 1938
Omphalotrochidae Knight, 1945
Pseudophoridae Miller, 1889
Raphistomatidae Koken, 1896
Tychobraheidae Horný, 1992 (excludes Tychobrahea)

In the meantime Boucet and Rocroi (2005) classified the Eumphaloidea simply as Paleozoic molluscs with anisostrophically coiled shells of uncertain position that are possibly gastropods, recognizing only five families, the:

Euomphalidae
Helicotomidae
Lesueurillidae
Omphalocirridae
Omphalotrochidae

=== Discussion, revised taxonomy ===
Prior to being included in the Euomphaloidea, the Anomphalidae, Elasmonematidae, Holopeidae, and Microdomatidae were included in the suborder Trochina, Cox & Knight 1960; the Anomphalidae in the Anomphalacea, the Elasmonematidae and Microdomatidae in the Microdomatacea, and the Holopeidae in the Plytyceratacea. The Raphystomatidae were included in the Pleurotomaracea, Pleurotomarina.

Omphalocirrus is included in the Maclurridae in the Treatise, 1960, but Lioomphalus, given as also in the Omphalocerridae is a synonym for Euomphalus, Euomphalidae,
