= Janospira =

Janospira Temporal range: Ordovician

Scientific classification
- Kingdom: Animalia
- Phylum: incertae sedis
- Genus: †Janospira

Extinct genus of molluscs

Janospira is a microfossil known from Ordovician deposits, whose affinity is uncertain. It resembles a spiral shell mounted on a cylinder, probably calcareous, about 1 mm in length. There are compelling reasons to discount a foraminiferan or molluscan affinity, though, some researchers presume it to be an archaeogastropod.

Species of Janospira are known from northern Spitsbergen, Norway, and from Australia
