= William M. Kier =

American biologist

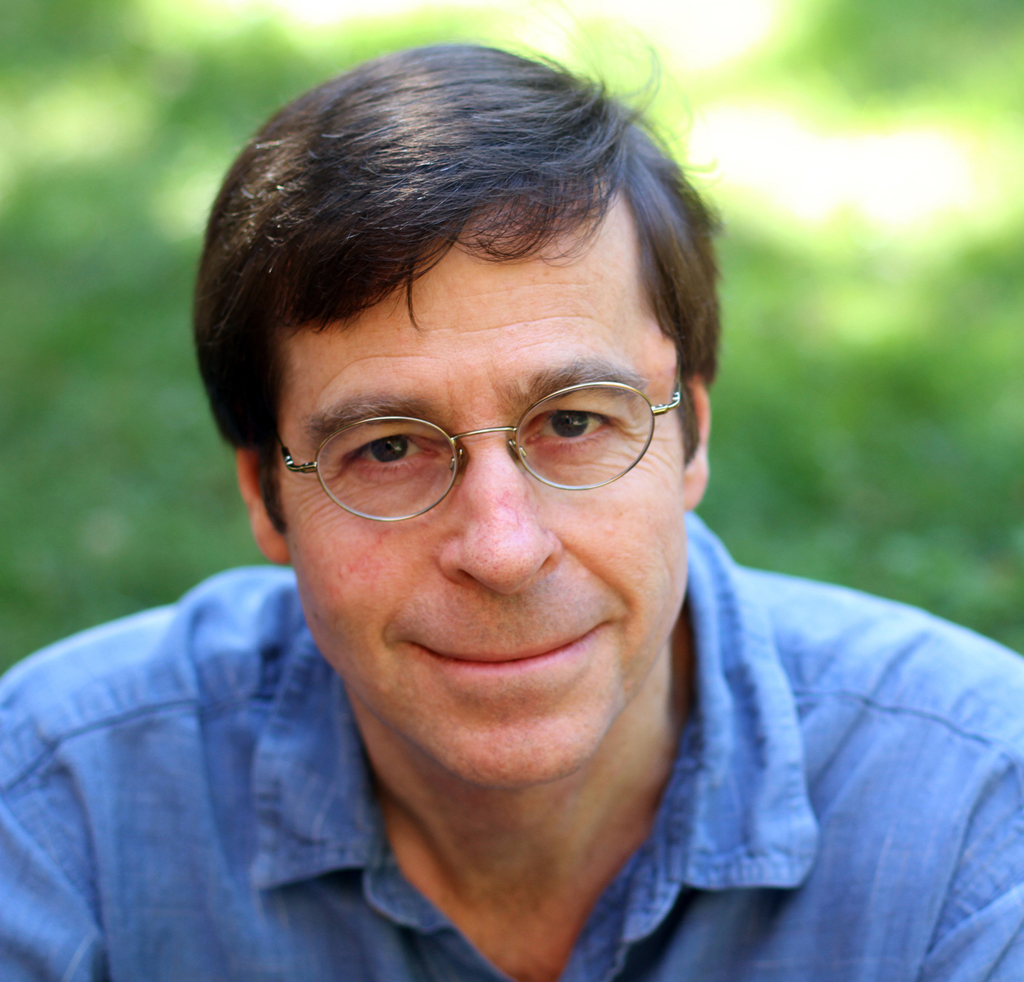
- Education: Colgate University; Duke University
- Known for: Co-introducing the term muscular hydrostat Research in the comparative biomechanics of marine invertebrates
- Scientific career
- Workplaces: University of North Carolina at Chapel Hill

William McKee Kier is an American biologist and professor emeritus at the University of North Carolina at Chapel Hill. He is known for his research in the comparative biomechanics of marine invertebrates, with a focus on the functional morphology and evolution of musculoskeletal systems, especially in cephalopod molluscs. He has received the Reinhard Rieger Award in Zoomorphology with Theodore A. Uyeno and the Presidential Young Investigator Award from the National Science Foundation.

== Early life and education ==
Kier earned a B.A. in Marine Science from Colgate University in 1978. He pursued graduate studies at Duke University, where he completed his Ph.D. in Zoology in 1983. He also participated in summer terms at the Duke University Marine Laboratory in Beaufort, North Carolina.

== Academic career ==
Kier joined the University of North Carolina at Chapel Hill as an Assistant Professor in the Department of Biology in 1985. He was promoted to Associate Professor in 1991 and full Professor in 1999, also holding a joint appointment in the Curriculum in Marine Sciences. He served as Chair of the Department of Biology from 2008 to 2013 and as Associate Chair from 2002 to 2008. Kier became a Research Professor in 2022 and was named Professor Emeritus in 2023. Kier held visiting research appointments, including positions at the Marine Biological Laboratory in Woods Hole, Stazione Zoologica in Naples, Italy, Hopkins Marine Station at Stanford University, Darling Marine Laboratory at the University of Maine, and marine laboratories in the United Kingdom and Japan.

== Research ==
Kier’s research centers on the biomechanics and functional morphology of musculoskeletal systems in marine invertebrates, particularly cephalopods such as squid and octopus.

A major component of his work concerns the concept of the muscular hydrostat, a biological structure composed of densely arranged three dimensional muscle fiber arrays that function simultaneously as force-generating and support systems. Unlike vertebrate endoskeletons or arthropod exoskeletons, muscular hydrostats lack rigid elements and do not rely on fluid-filled cavities for structural support. Examples include cephalopod arms and tentacles, mammalian tongues, and elephant trunks. Kier’s analyses demonstrated that these structures are capable of complex and coordinated movements including bending, elongation, shortening, and torsion often occurring simultaneously along different regions, thereby enabling precise manipulation and grasping.

He has also collaborated with engineers and biologists to apply principles derived from muscular hydrostats to the development of soft robotic systems. These bioinspired designs replicate the flexibility and adaptability of cephalopod limbs and other hydrostatic organs, allowing manipulation of objects with varying shapes and mechanical properties in unstructured environments.

In studies of squid muscle, he demonstrated that high shortening velocities are achieved through structural modifications in myofilament arrangement rather than biochemical changes typical of vertebrate muscle, challenging assumptions regarding the generality of vertebrate muscle models.

In 1985, in collaboration with Kathleen K. Smith, he co-introduced the term muscular hydrostat, which has since become adopted in comparative and functional biology.

== See also ==
- Muscular hydrostat
