= Onychochilidae =

Onychochilidae Temporal range: U Camb - L Dev

Scientific classification
- Kingdom: Animalia
- Phylum: Mollusca
- Class: †Helcionelloida
- Order: †Onychochiliformes
- Family: †Onychochilidae; Koken, 1925

Extinct family of gastropods

†Onychochilidae is an extinct family of small, fossil, upper Cambrian to lower Devonian molluscs. They have hyperstrophically coiled shells which generally have smooth whorls and elongate apertures. They are commonly considered to be gastropods, i.e. sea snails.

The Onychochilidae is included in the Macluritacea in the Treatise, Part I, 1960, as part of the Archaeogastropoda where it is divided into two subfamilies, the Onychochilina for those with high basal spires, and the Scaevogyranae for those with low basal spires. Robert M. Linsely and William M. Kier, 1984 reassigned the Onychochilidea to the Paragastropoda, a new class of molluscs proposed for gastropod-like forms which they interpreted as being untorted - that is viscerally not twisted. The Onychochilidae was at that time placed in the Onychochilacea, a superfamily included in a new order, the Hyperstophina, named for paragastropods with hyperstrophic to depressed-orthstrophic shells.

Bouchet and Rocroi, 2005 tentatively retained the Onychochilidae in the Gastropoda, including them along with the Clisospiridae in the superfamily Clisospiroidea, and added a third subfamily, the Hyperstropheminae, named for Hyperstrophema Horney, 1964, its sole known genus.
