= Omphalotrochus =

Scientific classification
- Domain: Eukaryota
- Kingdom: Animalia
- Phylum: Mollusca
- Class: Gastropoda
- Family: †Omphalotrochidae
- Genus: †Omphalotrochus

Extinct genus of gastropods

Omphalotrochus is an extinct taxonomic genus of Paleozoic gastropods. It is widely distributed in the upper Paleozoic and has been an important index fossil.

== Species ==
Species in the genus Omphalotrochus include:

- O. alleni Yochelson, 1956
- O. antiquus d'Orbigny, 1842
- O. calaniculatus Trautschold, 1879
- O. cochisensis Yochelson, 1956
- O. hessensis Yochelson, 1956
- O. kalitvaensis Licharev, 1940
- O. kalmiussi Zernetskaya, 1967
- O. karakubensis Zernetskaya, 1967
- O. obtusispira Shumard, 1859
- O. spinosus Yochelson, 1956
- O. whitneyi Meek, 1864
- O. wolfcampensis Yochelson, 1956
