= Kittlidiscidae =

Scientific classification
- Kingdom: Animalia
- Phylum: Mollusca
- Class: Gastropoda
- Subclass: Vetigastropoda
- Order: Pleurotomariida
- Superfamily: Pleurotomarioidea
- Family: †Kittlidiscidae; Cox, 1960

Extinct family of gastropods

Kittlidiscidae is an extinct family of Middle Triassic gastropods in the superfamily Pleurotomarioidea, named to contain the genus Kittlidiscus and included in the Vetigastropoda.

Note that Bouchet & Rocroi, 2005 gives Vetigastropoda simply as a clade, which not being paraphyletic, it also is, leaving taxonomic ranking to a future date. Other gastropod classifications, including those subsequent, have determined that the Vetigastropoda is a superorder.

== Genera ==
The Kittlidiscidae includes the genus Kittlidiscus.
