= Amphelissa =

Scientific classification
- Domain: Eukaryota
- Kingdom: Animalia
- Phylum: Mollusca
- Class: Gastropoda
- Family: †Helicotomidae
- Genus: †Amphelissa; Etheridge, Jr., 1921

Extinct genus of gastropods

Amphelissa is an extinct genus of paleozoic gastropod in the family Helicotomidae. The genus was first named by British paleontologist Robert Etheridge, Junior. Amphelissa lived during the Devonian period in Australia, and was a suspension feeder.

== Species ==
- Amphelissa carinatum
- Amphelissa isisensis
