= Zygitidae =

Scientific classification
- Kingdom: Animalia
- Phylum: Mollusca
- Class: Gastropoda
- Subclass: Vetigastropoda
- Order: Pleurotomariida
- Superfamily: Pleurotomarioidea
- Family: †Zygitidae; Cox, 1960

Extinct family of gastropods

†Zygitidae is an extinct family of fossil sea snails, marine gastropod molluscs in the clade Vetigastropoda. This family has no subfamilies.

== Genera ==
Genera within Zygitidae include:

- †Zygites, Kittl 1891
- †Kokenella, Kittl 1891
- †Cancellotomaria, Karapunar & Nützel 2021
