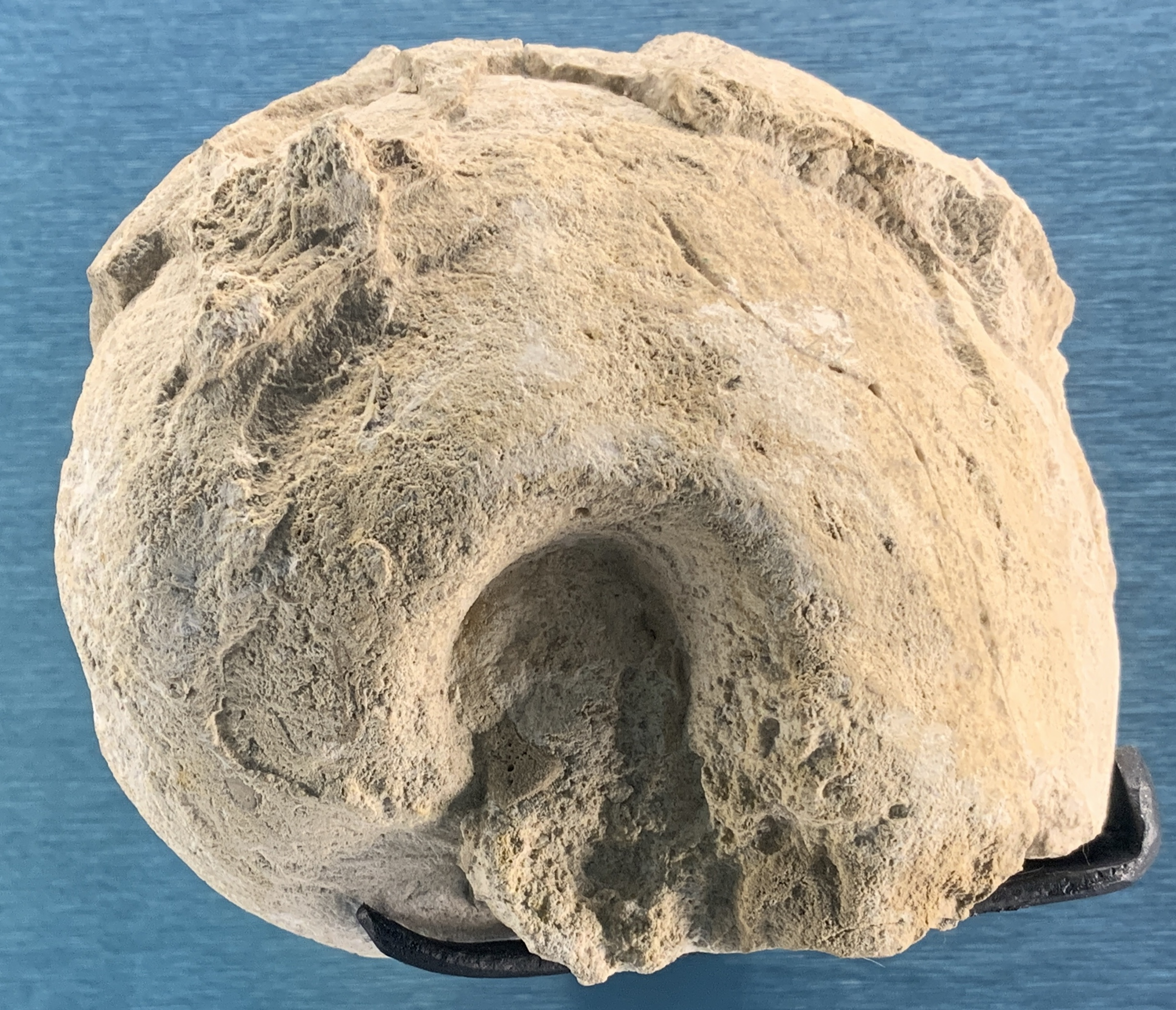

Scientific classification
- Kingdom: Animalia
- Phylum: Mollusca
- Class: Gastropoda
- Order: Archaeogastropoda
- Superfamily: †Macluritoidea; Carpenter, 1861

= Macluritoidea =

Macluritoidea Temporal range: L Cambrian- Devonian

Superfamily of gastropods

The Macluritoidea, or Macluritacea as it was originally spelled, is a superfamily of hyperstrophically coiled, Upper Cambrian to Devonian, archaeogastropods, or paragastropods according to Linsely and Kier (1984).

Coiling is dextral, although it appears sinistral, deduced from the position of the channel (presumed to be exhalent) contained in a ridge or keel (a selenizone on what is assumed to be the upper side. This is supported by the operculum of Maclurites, which corresponds to that of dextral gastropods.

According to the Treatise the Macluritaceae includes two families, the Onychochilidae and Macluritidae. Subsequent placement in the Paragastropoda is based on the assumption these animals were untorted, that is they lacked the twisted viscera that are present in modern gastropods.
