= Polytremariidae =

Scientific classification
- Kingdom: Animalia
- Phylum: Mollusca
- Class: Gastropoda
- Subclass: Vetigastropoda
- Order: Pleurotomariida
- Superfamily: Pleurotomarioidea
- Family: †Polytremariidae; Wenz, 1938

Extinct family of gastropods

Polytremariidae is an extinct family of gastropods in the clade Vetigastropoda

This family contains two genera, Polytremaria and Strictohumerus.
