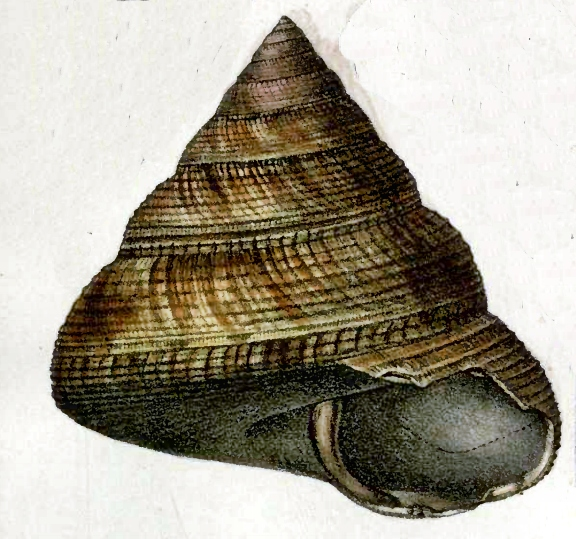
- Drawing with an apertural view of Mikadotrochus beyrichii

Scientific classification
- Kingdom: Animalia
- Phylum: Mollusca
- Class: Gastropoda
- Subclass: Vetigastropoda
- Order: Pleurotomariida
- Family: Pleurotomariidae
- Genus: Mikadotrochus
- Species: M. beyrichii

Binomial name
- Mikadotrochus beyrichii (Hilgendorf, 1877)

Synonyms
- Pleurotomaria beyrichii Hilgendorf, 1877

= Mikadotrochus beyrichii =

Species of gastropod

Mikadotrochus beyrichii, common name Beyrich's slit shell, is a species of sea snail, a marine gastropod mollusk in the family Pleurotomariidae.

It was discovered by Franz Martin Hilgendorf in an ancient Japanese collection.

== Description ==
The size of the shell varies between 50 mm and 100 mm. The shell has a trochiform shape. It is as high as broad. It has a flat base. It shows moderately numerous spiral lines. It is pale yellow, beautifully flamed with 11 red whorls that are regularly increasing. The penultimate whorl has 8 lirae above, 2 in and 2 under the slit fasciole. These lirae are beset with weak nodules, about 3 times as long (in the direction of the spiral) as high or broad. The body whorl has a blunt angle at its base. This base contains 20 concentric lirae, and in the middle a deep pit or "false umbilicus". On the outside it is white, on the inside it is pearly. The thick, pearly columellar margin is S-shaped.

== Distribution ==
M. beyrichii is endemic to the coastal waters of Japan. and China

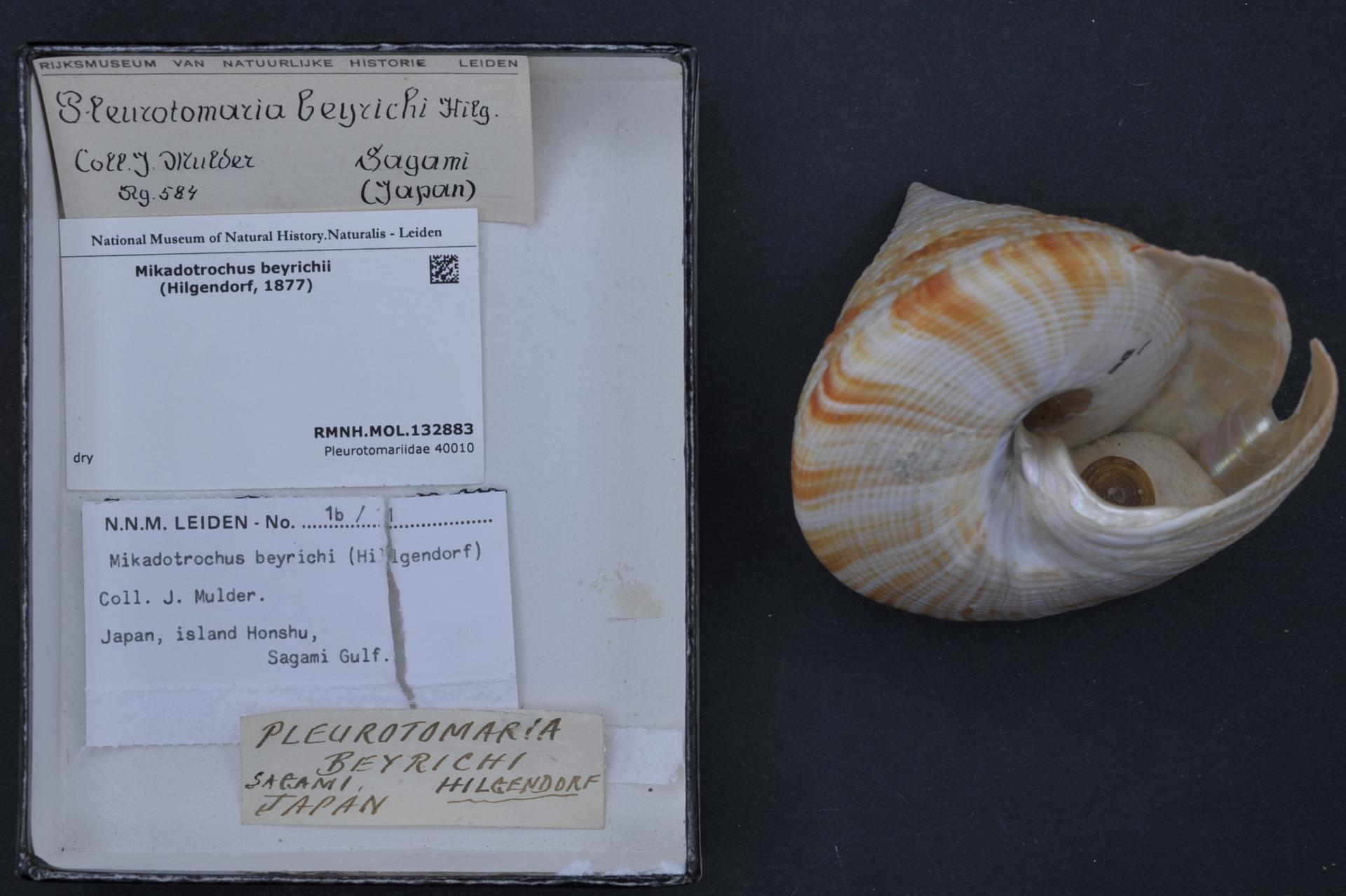
Mikadotrochus beyrichii (Hilgendorf, 1877). Museum specimen, Naturalis Leiden.
