= Muscular hydrostat =

Body part type that consists mainly of muscles with no skeletal support

The tongue is a muscular hydrostat.

A muscular hydrostat is a biological structure found in animals. It is used to manipulate items (including food) or to move its host about and consists mainly of muscles with no skeletal support. It performs its hydraulic movement without fluid in a separate compartment, as in a hydrostatic skeleton.

A muscular hydrostat, like a hydrostatic skeleton, relies on the fact that water is effectively incompressible at physiological pressures. In contrast to a hydrostatic skeleton, where muscle surrounds a fluid-filled cavity, a muscular hydrostat is composed mainly of muscle tissue. Since muscle tissue itself is mainly made of water and is also effectively incompressible, similar principles apply.

== Muscular anatomy ==
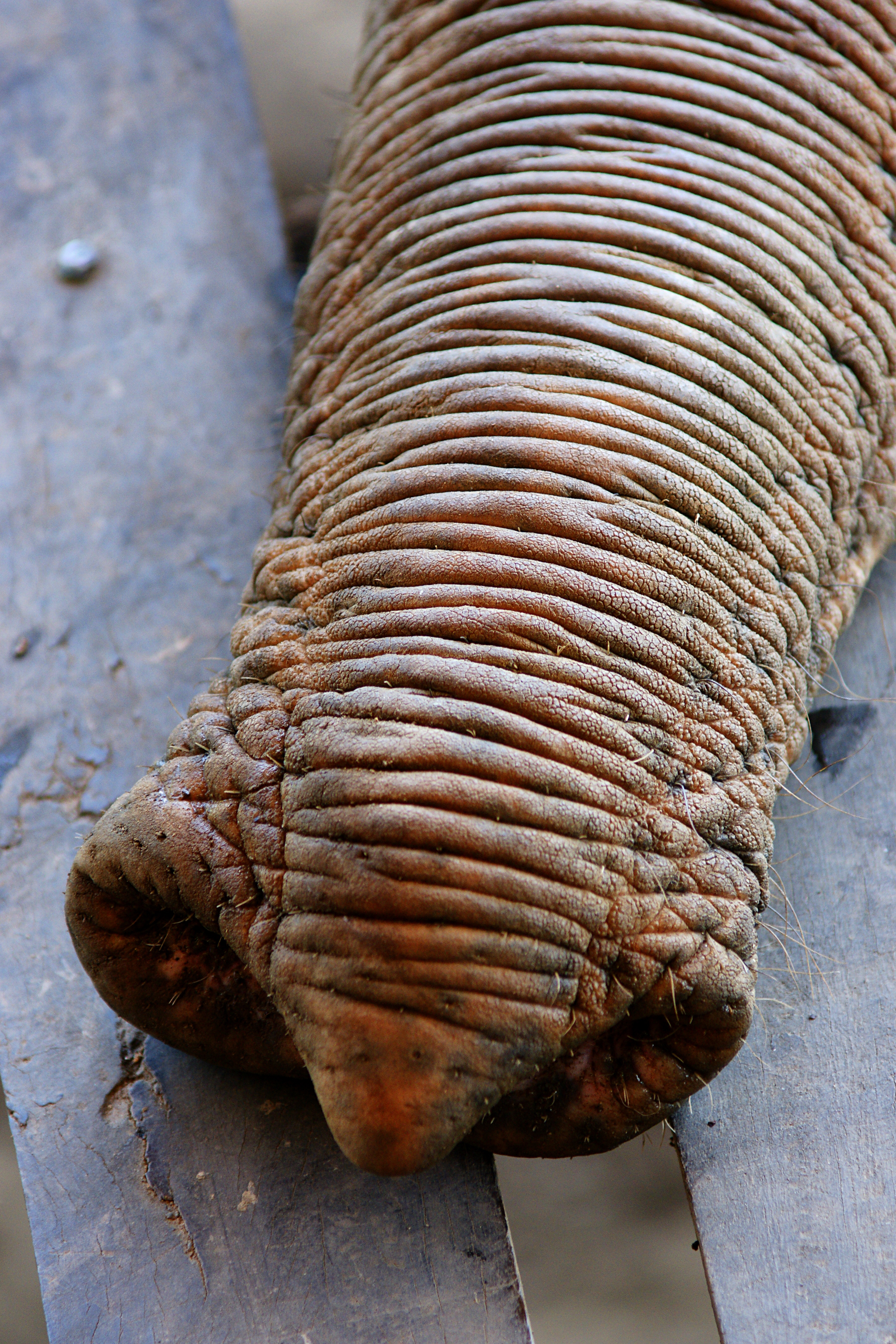
Closeup of the trunk of an Asian elephant

Muscles provide the force to move a muscular hydrostat. Since muscles are only able to produce force by contracting and becoming shorter, different groups of muscles have to work against each other, with one group relaxing and lengthening as the other group provides the force by contracting. Such complementary muscle groups are termed antagonistic pairs.

The muscle fibers in a muscular hydrostat are oriented in three directions: parallel to the long axis, perpendicular to the long axis, and wrapped obliquely around the long axis.

The muscles parallel to the long axis are arranged in longitudinal bundles. The more peripherally these are located, the more elaborate bending movements are possible. A more peripheral distribution is found in tetrapod tongues, octopus arms, nautilus tentacles, and elephant trunks. Tongues that are adapted for protrusion typically have centrally located longitudinal fibers. These are found in snake tongues, many lizard tongues, and the mammalian anteaters.

The muscles perpendicular to the long axis may be arranged in a transverse, circular, or radial pattern. A transverse arrangement involves sheets of muscle fibers running perpendicular to the long axis, usually alternating between horizontal and vertical orientations. This arrangement is found in the arms and tentacles of squid, octopuses, and in most mammalian tongues. A radial arrangement involves fibers radiating out in all directions from the center of the organ. This is found in the tentacles of the chambered nautilus and in the elephant proboscis (trunk). A circular arrangement has rings of contractive fibers around the long axis. This is found in many mammalian and lizard tongues along with squid tentacles.

Helical or oblique fibers around the long axis are generally present in two layers with opposite chirality and wrap around the central core of musculature.

== Mechanism of operation ==
In a muscular hydrostat, the musculature itself both creates movement and provides skeletal support for that movement. It can provide this support because it is composed primarily of an incompressible “liquid" and is thus constant in volume. The most important biomechanical feature of a muscular hydrostat is its constant volume. Muscle is composed primarily of an aqueous liquid that is essentially incompressible at physiological pressures. In a muscular hydrostat or any other structure of constant volume, a decrease in one dimension will cause a compensatory increase in at least one other dimension. The mechanisms of elongation, bending and torsion in muscular hydrostats all depend on constancy of volume to effect shape changes in the absence of stiff skeletal attachments. Since muscular hydrostats are under constant volume when the diameter increases or decreases, the length must also decrease or increase, respectively. When looking at a cylinder the volume is: V=πr²l. When the radius is differentiated with respect to the length: dr/dl=-r/(2l). From this, if a diameter decreases by 25%, the length will increase by approximately 80% which may produce a large amount of force depending on what the animal is trying to do.

=== Elongation and shortening ===
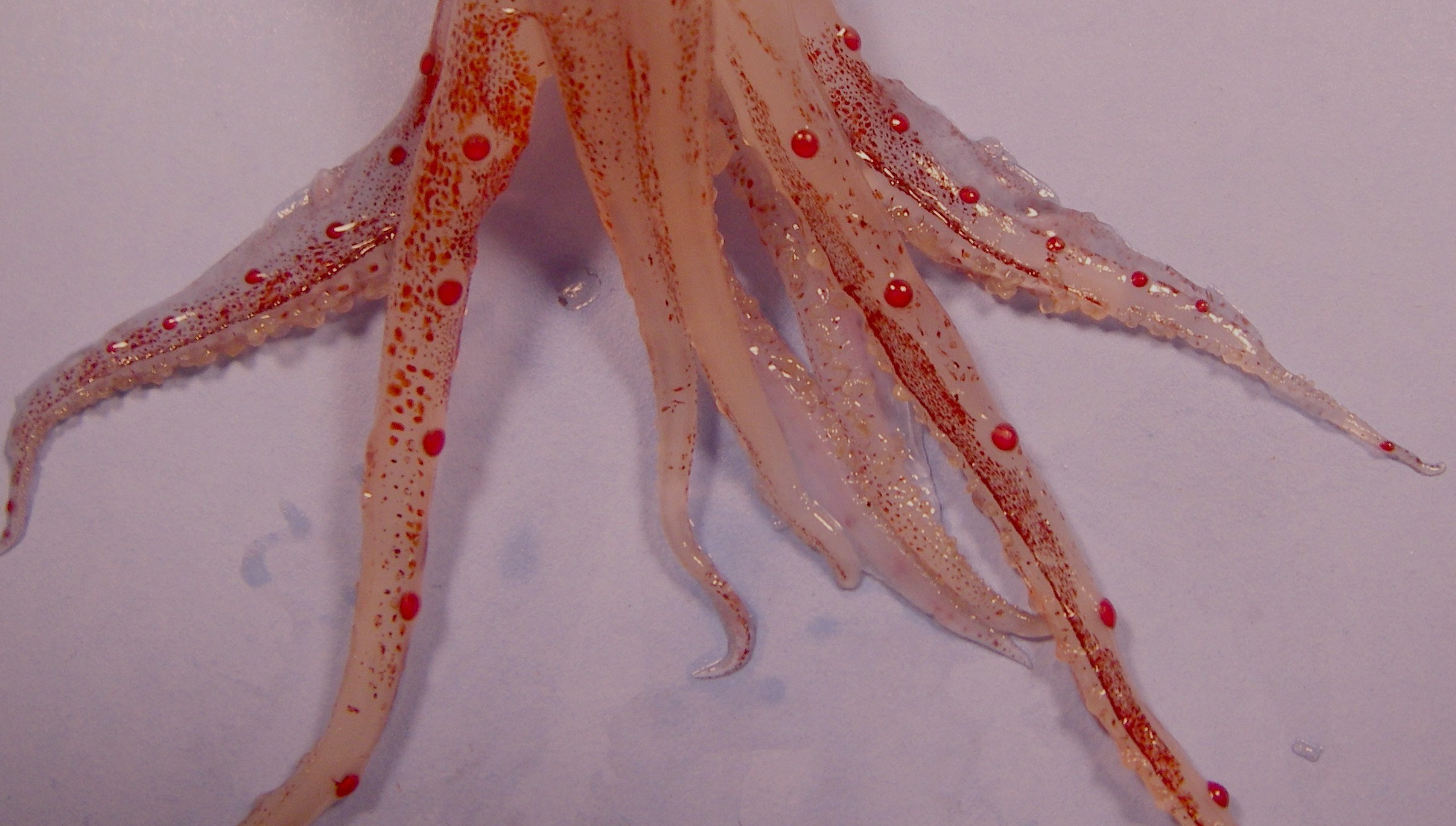
Arms and tentacles of the squid Abralia veranyi

Elongation in hydrostats is caused by the contraction of transverse or helical musculature arrangements. Given the constant volume of muscular hydrostats, these contractions cause an elongation of the longitudinal muscles. Change in length is proportional to the square of the decrease in diameter. Therefore, contractions of muscles perpendicular to the long axis will cause a decrease in diameter while keeping a constant volume will elongate the organ length-wise. Shortening, on the other hand, can be caused by contraction of the muscles parallel to the long axis resulting in the organ increasing in diameter as well as shortening in length.

The muscles used in elongation and shortening maintain support through the constant volume principle and their antagonistic relationships with each other. These mechanisms are seen often in prey capture of shovelnose frogs and chameleons, as well as in the human tongue and many other examples. In some frogs, the tongue elongates up to 180% of its resting length. Extra-oral tongues show higher length/width ratios than intra-oral tongues, allowing for a greater increase in length (more than 100% of resting length, as compared to intra-oral tongues at only about 50% of resting length increase). Greater elongation lengths trade off with the force produced by the organ; as the length/width ratio is increased elongation increases while force is decreased. Squids have been shown to use muscular hydrostat elongation in prey capture and feeding as well.

=== Bending ===
The bending of a muscular hydrostat can occur in two ways, both of which require the use of antagonistic muscles. The unilateral contraction of a longitudinal muscle will produce little or no bending and will serve to increase the diameter of the muscular hydrostat because of the constant volume principle that must be met. To bend the hydrostat structure, the unilateral contraction of longitudinal muscle must be accompanied by contractile activity of transverse, radial, or circular muscles to maintain a constant diameter. Bending of a muscular hydrostat can also occur by the contraction of transverse, radial, or circular muscles which decreases the diameter. Bending is produced by longitudinal muscle activity which maintains a constant length on one side of the structure.

The bending of a muscular hydrostat is particularly important in animal tongues. This motion provides the mechanism by which a snake flicks the air with its tongue to sense its surroundings, and it is also responsible for the complexities of human speech.

=== Stiffening ===
The stiffening of a muscular hydrostat is accomplished by the muscle or connective tissue of the hydrostat resisting dimensional changes.

=== Torsion ===
Torsion is the twisting of a muscular hydrostat along its long axis and is produced by a helical or oblique arrangement of musculature which have varying direction. For a counter-clockwise torsion it is necessary for a right-hand helix to contract. Contraction of a left-hand helix causes clockwise torsion. The simultaneous contraction of both right and left-hand helixes results in an increase in resistance to torsional forces. The oblique or helical muscle arrays in the muscular hydrostats are located in the periphery of the structure, wrapping the inner core of musculature, and this peripheral location provides a larger moment through which the torque is applied than a more central location. The effect of helically arranged muscle fibers, which may also contribute to changes in length of a muscular hydrostat, depends on fiber angle—the angle that the helical muscle fibers make with the long axis of the structure.

The length of the helical fiber is at a minimum when the fiber angle equals 54°44′ and is at maximum length when the fiber angle approaches 0° and 90°. Summed up, this means that helically arranged muscle fibers with a fiber angle greater than 54°44′ will create force for both torsion and elongation while helically arranged muscle fibers with a fiber angle less than 54°44′ will create force for both torsion and shortening. The fiber angle of the oblique or helical muscle layers must increase during shortening and decrease during lengthening. In addition to creating a torsional force, the oblique muscle layers will therefore create a force for elongation that may aid the transverse musculature in resisting longitudinal compression.

== Examples ==
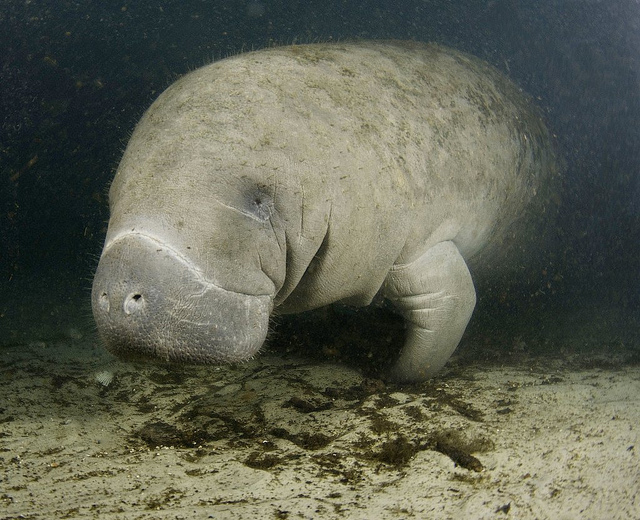
West Indian manatee

- Whole bodies of many worms
- Feet of mollusks (including arms and tentacles in cephalopods)
- Tongues of mammals and reptiles
- Trunks of elephants
- The snout of the West Indian manatee

== Technological applications ==
A group of engineers and biologists have collaborated to develop robotic arms that are able to manipulate and handle various objects of different size, mass, surface texture and mechanical properties. These robotic arms have many advantages over previous robotic arms that were not based on muscular hydrostats.
