= Catantostomatidae =

Catantostomatidae Temporal range: Middle Devonian

Scientific classification
- Kingdom: Animalia
- Phylum: Mollusca
- Class: Gastropoda
- Subclass: Vetigastropoda
- Order: Pleurotomariida
- Superfamily: Pleurotomarioidea
- Family: †Catantostomatidae; Wenz, 1938

Genera
- See text

Extinct family of gastropods

Catantostomatidae is an extinct family of marine gastropods included in the Vetigastropoda and placed in the superfamily Pleurotomarioidea.

== Genera ==
Catantostomatidae was established for the genus Catantostoma.
