= Phymatopleuridae =

Scientific classification
- Kingdom: Animalia
- Phylum: Mollusca
- Class: Gastropoda
- Subclass: Vetigastropoda
- Order: Pleurotomariida
- Superfamily: Pleurotomarioidea
- Family: †Phymatopleuridae; Batten, 1956

Extinct family of gastropods

Phymatopleuridae is an extinct family of fossil sea snails, marine gastropod molluscs in the superfamily Pleurotomarioidea (according to the taxonomy of the Gastropoda by Bouchet & Rocroi, 2005).

This family has no subfamilies.

== Genera ==
Genera within the family Phymatopleuridae include:

- Phymatopleura, the type genus
