= Rhaphischismatidae =

Rhaphischismatidae Temporal range: Late Carboniferous–Mississippian

Scientific classification
- Kingdom: Animalia
- Phylum: Mollusca
- Class: Gastropoda
- Subclass: Vetigastropoda
- Order: Pleurotomariida
- Superfamily: Pleurotomarioidea
- Genus: †Rhaphischismatidae; J. B. Knight, 1956

Extinct family of gastropods

Rhaphischismatidae is an extinct family of fossil sea snails, marine gastropod molluscs in the superorder Vetigastropoda. They date from the Lower Carboniferous (Mississippian). The family contains a single genus, Raphischisma. In the Bouchet & Rocroi, 2005), this family is assigned to the Pleurotomariacea.

== Genera ==
Raphischisma is the only known genus. Its description is that of the family.

== Description ==
Rhaphycasma is characterized by a discoidal shell with a rounded periphery, depressed spire, umbilical callus formed by the inward extension of the lower aperture lip, and a deep, narrow slit, that extends along the upper surface, near the upper suture. The unique features of the lower lip generate an umbilical callus and deep, long, exhalent slit on the upper side along with the generally smooth form. These shell characters set this genus, and family, apart from other gastropods in the same superfamily.
