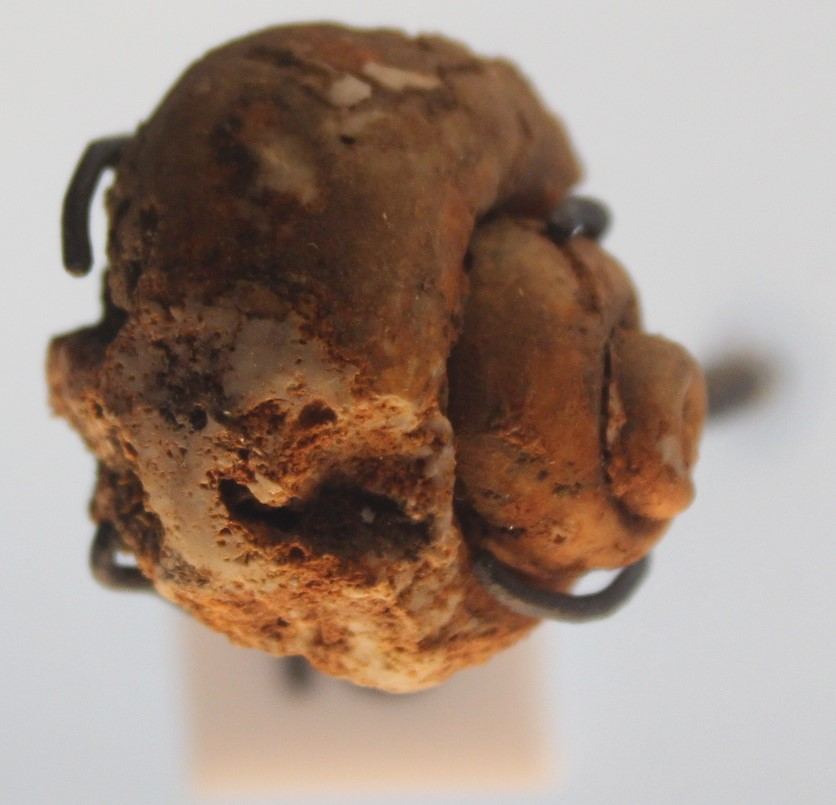
- Sinuopea eminensis fossil, National Museum of Natural History

Scientific classification
- Kingdom: Animalia
- Phylum: Mollusca
- Class: Gastropoda
- Subclass: incertae sedis
- Genus: †Sinuopeidae; Wenz, 1938

= Sinuopeidae =

Extinct family of gastropods

Sinuopeidae is an extinct family of fossil sea snails, Paleozoic gastropod molluscs.

This family is unassigned to superfamily. This family consists of three following subfamilies (according to the taxonomy of the Gastropoda by Bouchet & Rocroi, 2005):

- Sinuopeinae Wenz, 1938
- Platyschismatinae Knight, 1956
- Turbonellininae Knight, 1956
