= Portlockiellidae =

Scientific classification
- Kingdom: Animalia
- Phylum: Mollusca
- Class: Gastropoda
- Subclass: Vetigastropoda
- Order: Pleurotomariida
- Superfamily: Pleurotomarioidea
- Family: †Portlockiellidae; Batten, 1956

Extinct family of gastropods

Portlockiellidae is an extinct family of gastropods in the clade Vetigastropoda (according to the taxonomy of the Gastropoda by Bouchet & Rocroi, 2005).

This family has no subfamilies.

== Genera ==
Genera within the family Portlockiellidae include:

- Portlockiella Knight, 1945 - the type genus
- Agniesella
- Hammatospira
- Nodonema
- Shansiella = Latischisma
- Tapinotomaria
