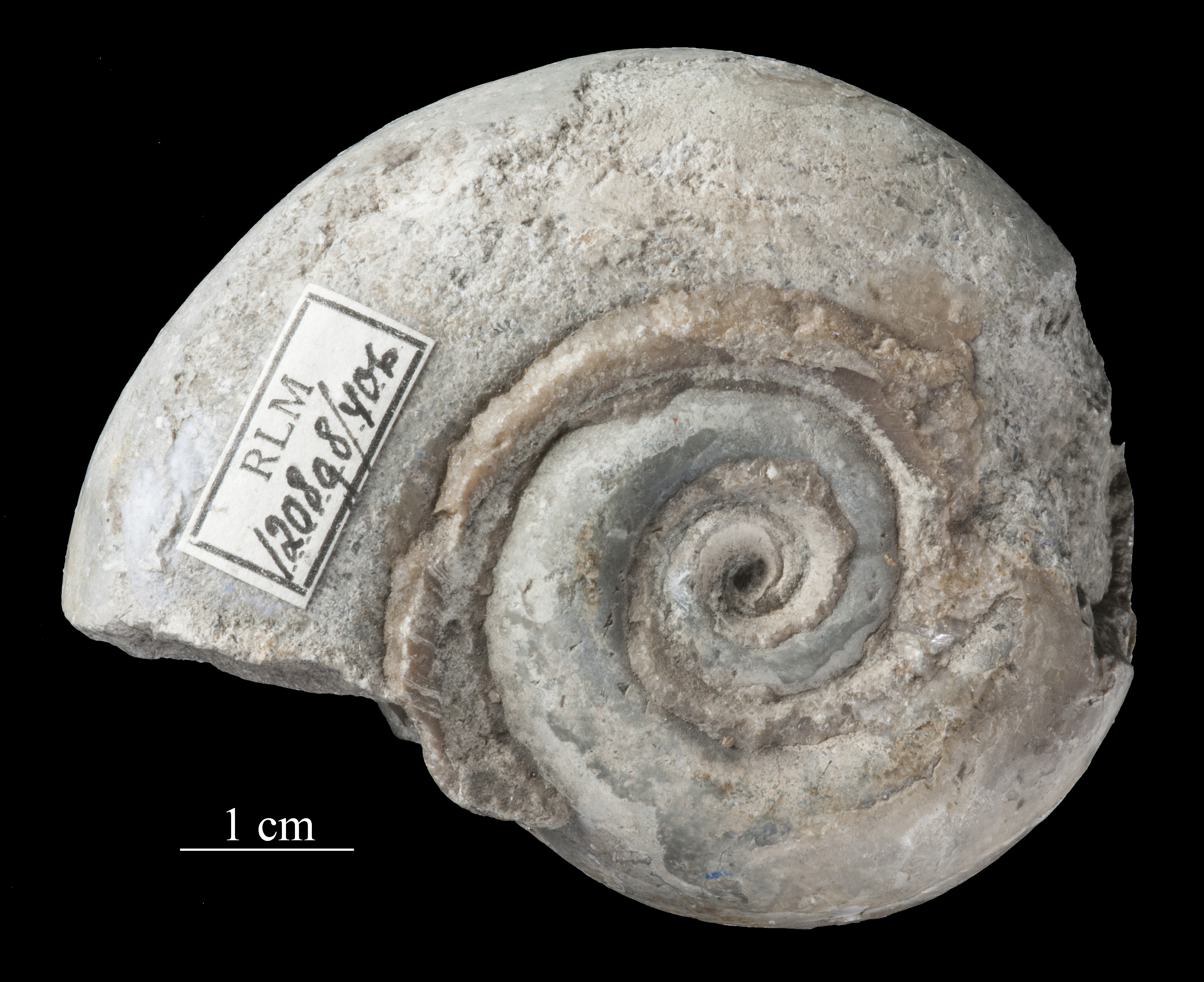
- Lesueurilla helix

Scientific classification
- Kingdom: Animalia
- Phylum: Mollusca
- Class: Gastropoda
- Subclass: incertae sedis
- Superfamily: †Euomphaloidea
- Family: †Lesueurillidae; P. J. Wagner, 2002

Genera
- See text

= Lesueurillidae =

Extinct family of gastropods

Lesueurillidae is an extinct family of paleozoic molluscs (gastropods?) with anisostrophically coiled shells of uncertain position (Gastropoda?) (according to the taxonomy of the Gastropoda by Bouchet & Rocroi, 2005).

== Taxonomy ==
The taxonomy of the Gastropoda by Bouchet & Rocroi, 2005 categorizes Lesueurillidae in the superfamilia Euomphaloidea within the Paleozoic molluscs with anisostrophically coiled shells of uncertain position (Gastropoda?). This family has no subfamilies.

== Genera ==
Genera in the family Lesueurillidae include

- Eccyliopterus Remelé, 1888
  - Eccyliopterus abendanoni
  - Eccyliopterus alatus (Roemer, 1876) - type species
  - Eccyliopterus corniculum
  - Eccyliopterus declivis Koken, 1925 - synonym: Eccyliopterus spirillum.
  - Eccyliopterus incresens
  - Eccyliopterus ottawaensis
  - Eccyliopterus owenanus
  - Eccyliopterus regularis - synonym: Eccyliopterus princeps.
  - Eccyliopterus replicata
  - Eccyliopterus septiferus
  - Eccyliopterus tolli
  - Eccyliopterus vagrans
- Lesueurilla Koken, 1898 - type genus of the family Lesueurillidae
  - Lesueurilla acutangulum
  - Lesueurilla bohemica
  - Lesueurilla beloitensis
  - Lesueurilla dilatata
  - Lesueurilla grandis
  - Lesueurilla helix
  - Lesueurilla infundibulum (Koken, 1896) - type species
  - Lesueurilla isabellaensis
  - Lesueurilla kushanensis
  - Lesueurilla louderbacki
  - Lesueurilla magna
  - Lesueurilla prima
  - Lesueurilla shirakii
  - Lesueurilla sinkiangensis
- Mestoronema P. J. Wagner, 2002
  - Mestoronema bipatellare Koken, 1925 - type species
  - Mestoronema marginalis (Koken, 1925)
  - Mestoronema scotica (Longstaff, 1924)

== Description ==
Fossils of family Lesueurillidae has sharp peripheral band and a short notch formed from deep V-shaped sinus. They are similar to Maclurites but they differ in early ontogenesis from them.
