= Omphalotrochidae =

Scientific classification
- Kingdom: Animalia
- Phylum: Mollusca
- Class: Gastropoda
- Superfamily: †Euomphaloidea
- Family: †Omphalotrochidae; Knight, 1945

Genera
- See text

Extinct family of gastropods

Omphalotrochidae is an extinct taxonomic family of Paleozoic molluscs (gastropods?) with anisostrophically coiled shells of uncertain position (Gastropoda?) (according to the taxonomy of the Gastropoda by Bouchet & Rocroi, 2005).

== Taxonomy ==
The taxonomy of the Gastropoda by Bouchet & Rocroi, 2005 places Omphalotrochidae in the superfamilia Euomphaloidea within the Paleozoic molluscs with anisostrophically coiled shells of uncertain position (Gastropoda?). This family has no subfamilies.

== Genera ==
Genera in the family Omphalotrochidae include:

- Coronopsis Waterhouse, 1963
- Omphalotrochus Meek, 1864 - type genus of the family Omphalotrochidae
