= Helicotomidae =

Scientific classification
- Kingdom: Animalia
- Phylum: Mollusca
- Class: Gastropoda
- Superfamily: †Euomphaloidea
- Family: †Helicotomidae; Wenz, 1938

Genera
- See text

Extinct family of gastropods

Helicotomidae is an extinct family of Paleozoic molluscs (gastropods?) with anisostrophically coiled shells of uncertain position (Gastropoda?) (according to the taxonomy of the Gastropoda by Bouchet & Rocroi, 2005).

== Taxonomy ==
The taxonomy of the Gastropoda by Bouchet & Rocroi, 2005 categorizes Helicotomidae in the superfamilia Euomphaloidea within the Paleozoic molluscs with anisostrophically coiled shells of uncertain position (Gastropoda?). This family has no subfamilies.

== Genera ==
Genera in the family Helicotomidae include:

- Amphelissa
- Boucotspira
- Boucotspira
- Burdikinia - synonym: Polyamma.
- Colpomphalus
- Helicotoma Satler, 1859 - type genus of the family Helicotomidae
- Lophonema - synonym: Polhemia.
- Ophiletina
- Palaeomphalus
- Paraviviana
- Walcottoma
- Yochelsoniella
