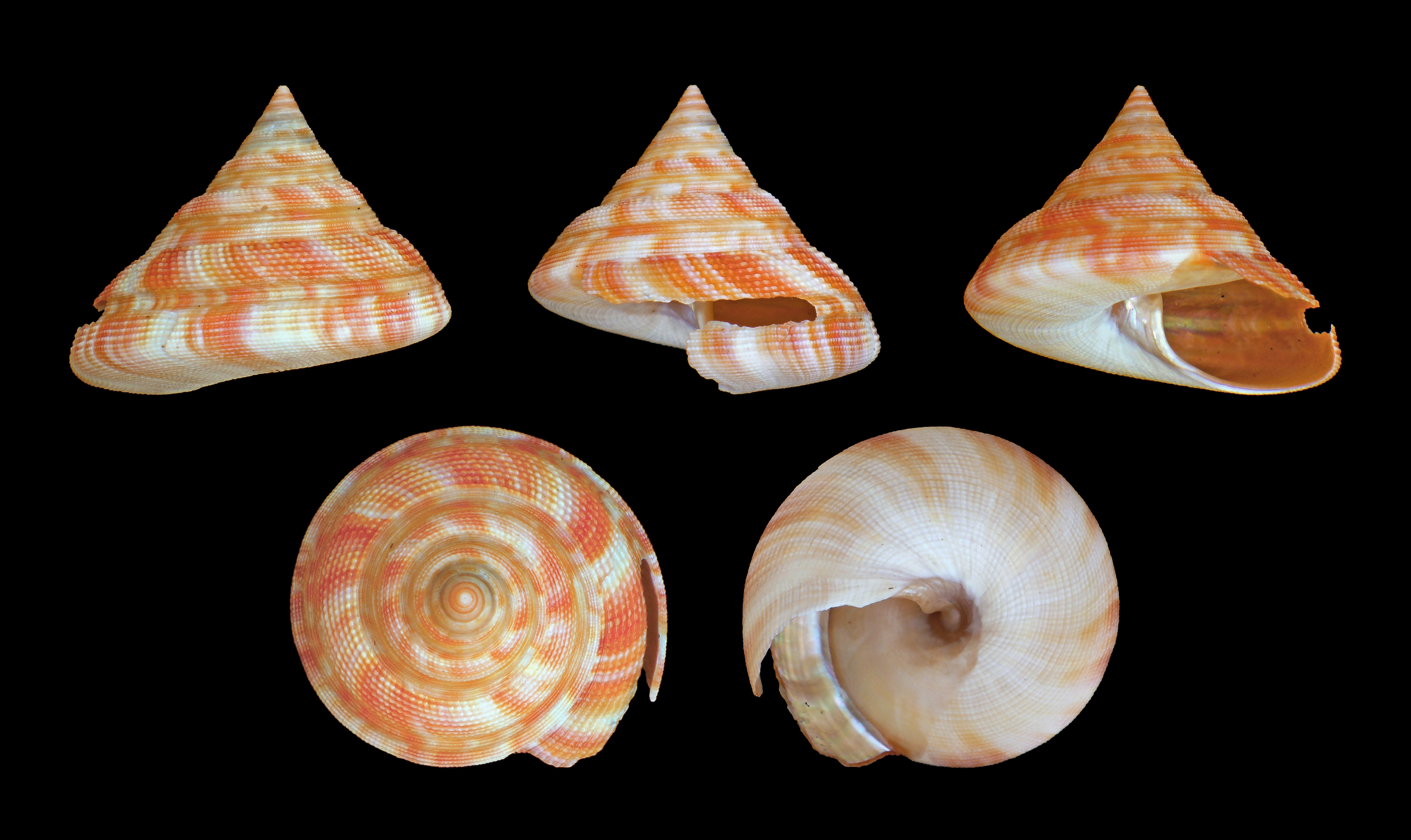
- Five views of a shell of Mikadotrochus hirasei

Scientific classification
- Kingdom: Animalia
- Phylum: Mollusca
- Class: Gastropoda
- Subclass: Vetigastropoda
- Order: Pleurotomariida
- Family: Pleurotomariidae
- Genus: Mikadotrochus
- Species: M. hirasei

Binomial name
- Mikadotrochus hirasei (Pilsbry, 1903)

Synonyms
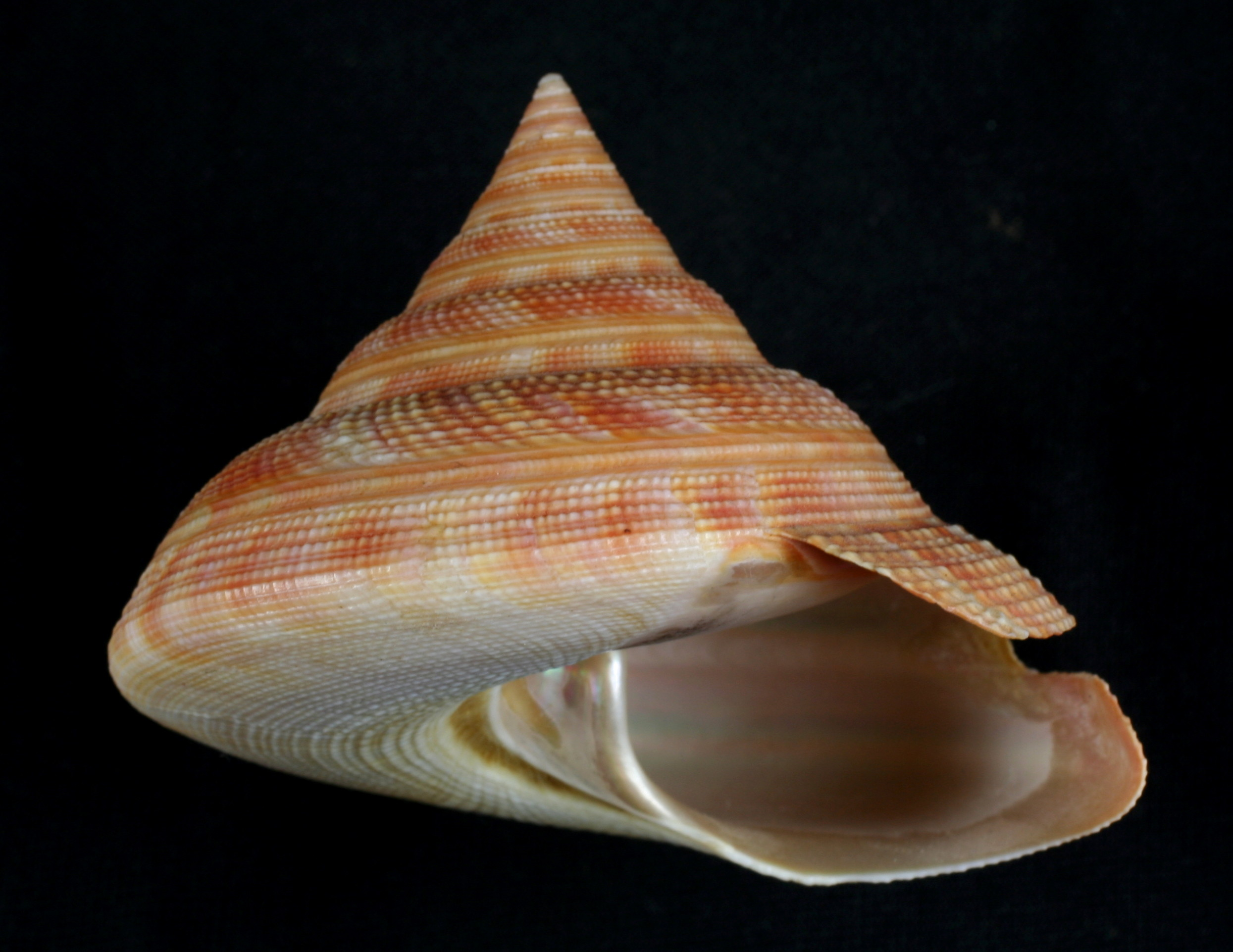
- Mikadotrochus hirasei yamamotoi Yamamoto, 1993; Perotrochus hirasei (Pilsbry, 1903); Pleurotomaria hirasei Pilsbry, 1903; Shell of Mikadotrochus hirasei (Pilsbry, 1903), measuring 55.7 mm height by 68.6 mm width, trawled at 300 ft. in Japan.

= Mikadotrochus hirasei =

Species of gastropod

Mikadotrochus hirasei, common name the emperor's slit shell, is a species of large deepwater sea snail, a marine gastropod mollusk in the family Pleurotomariidae, the slit snails.

== Description ==
The shell has a typical trochoid shape with a spire angle of approximately 72 degrees and nearly smooth sided until the body whorls which are slightly inflated at the shoulder with a rounded periphery. The base is moderately convex to flat, and the shell has a large nacreous (pearly) columellar callus which covers about one third of the base and can be keeled at its outer margin. The aperture is oval, the slit is positioned mid whorl and is long, about 16 to 20 percent of the circumference. The shell is heavily textured with about 20 spiral cords crossed by numerous fine crescent shaped axial growth lines above the selenizone (the area where the shell growth filled in the slit) and about 10 spiral cords below.

The shell is creamy yellow overlaid with many crimson axial flammules above and below the selenizone which has yellowish orange crescent shaped growth marks, the base is a pale creamy yellow with occasional light crimson flammules, and the interior of the aperture is nacreous. The shell is occasionally found with part of its dark brown periostracum near the margin opposite the aperture. The operculum is small, dark brown, multispiral, and chitinous. Size range: 45 to 129 mm diameter.

== Distribution ==
This species is found in deep water between 150 and 300 meters on mud and sand off the coast of the Shima Peninsula in Japan westwards to the Pacific coast of Shikoku Island, in the East China Sea west of Kyushu to Taiwan, and has also been found in the central Philippines.
