= Ophiletidae =

Scientific classification
- Kingdom: Animalia
- Phylum: Mollusca
- Class: Gastropoda
- Subclass: incertae sedis
- Superfamily: †Ophiletoidea; Koken, 1907
- Family: †Ophiletidae; Koken, 1907

Synonyms
- Ecculiomphalinae Wenz, 1938

Extinct family of gastropods

Ophiletidae is an extinct family of fossil sea snails, marine gastropod molluscs.

Ophiletidae is the only family in the superfamily Ophiletoidea.

This family has no subfamilies.

Genera:

- †Asgardaspira P. J. Wagner, 2002
- †Lytospira Koken, 1896
- †Malayaspira Kobayashi, 1958
- †Ophileta Vanuxem, 1842
- †Rossospira Rohr, 1994
