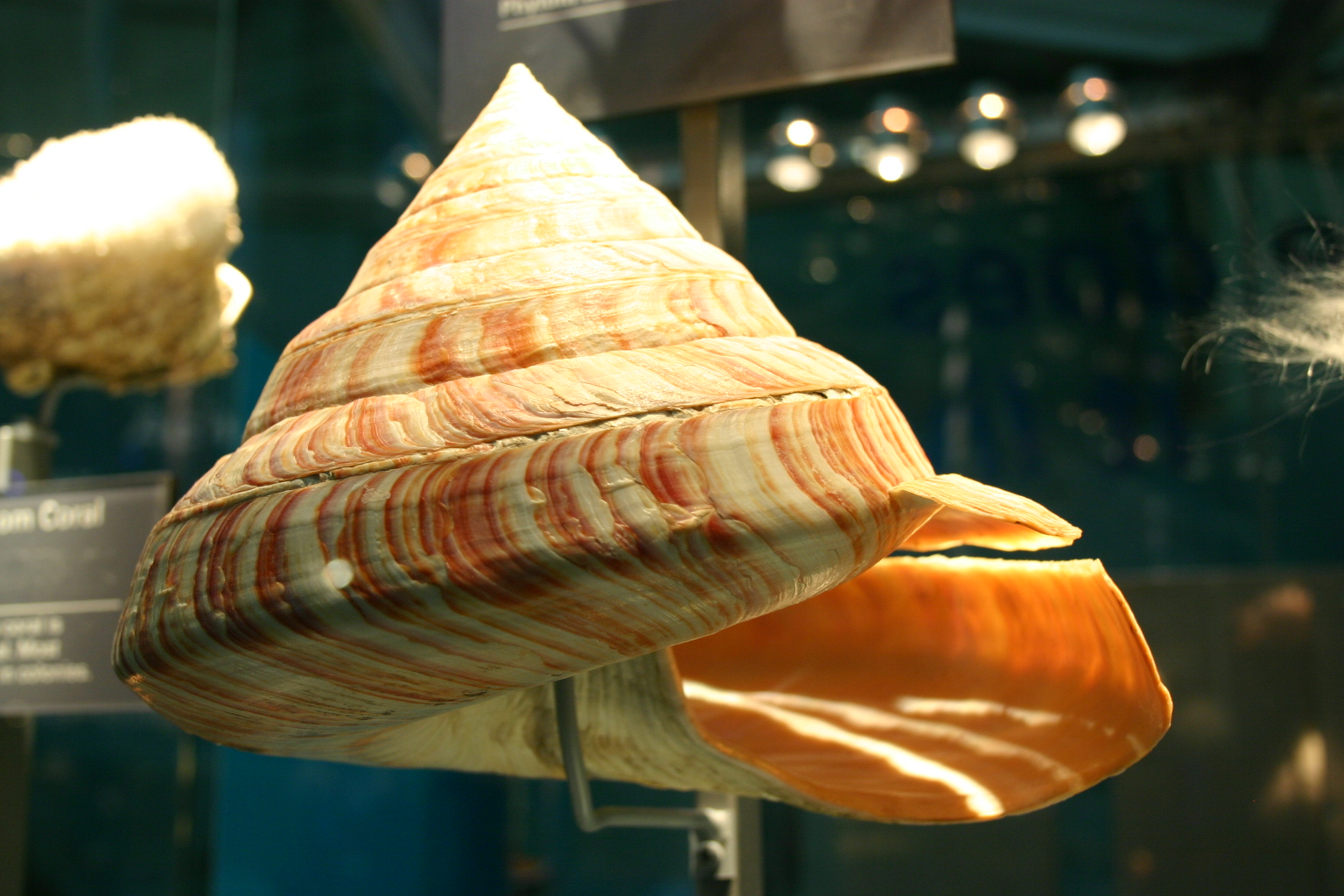
- A shell of Entemnotrochus rumphii

Scientific classification
- Kingdom: Animalia
- Phylum: Mollusca
- Class: Gastropoda
- Subclass: Vetigastropoda
- Order: Pleurotomariida
- Superfamily: Pleurotomarioidea; Swainson, 1840

Families
- See text

= Pleurotomarioidea =

Pleurotomarioidea Temporal range: Cambrian–Recent

Superfamily of gastropods

Pleurotomarioidea is a superfamily of small to large marine gastropods included in the order Pleurotomariida of the subclass Vetigastropoda.

These are the slit shells, originally named Pleurotomariacea, in keeping with the convention for naming superfamilies at the time. This updated version of the name for the taxon is usually used by students of the living Mollusca. Paleontologists often still use the name Pleurotomariacea instead.

== Evolutionary history ==
Forming the first evidence of crown-group gastropods when they appeared in the Upper Cambrian, the fossil record of the Pleurotomarioideans has no substantial gaps until today. The group took quite a hit at the Cretaceous–Paleogene boundary (K–T boundary), with only the Pleurotomariidae surviving the Cretaceous–Paleogene extinction event – and then only in deep waters.

Living representatives of the group were first discovered in the mid-19th century, and their unusual mix of primitive and derived characters perplexed biologists. The researchers originally responded by re-working their ideas of how the gastropod lineage evolved, but with the introduction of cladistics, attempts are currently underway to fit them into a molluscan phylogeny.

== Taxonomy ==
=== 2004 taxonomy ===
J. D. Stilwell et al. 2004 put the Pleurotomarioidea in the order Archaeogastropoda which is included in the Prosobranchia.

=== 1993 and 2005 taxonomy ===
The following families have been recognized in taxonomy by Tracey at al. (1993) and in the taxonomy of Bouchet & Rocroi (2005):

- family Pleurotomariidae
- † family Catantostomatidae
- † family Kittlidiscidae
- † family Phymatopleuridae
- † family Polytremariidae
- † family Portlockiellidae
- † family Rhaphischismatidae
- † family Trochotomidae
- † family Zygitidae

Bouchet and Rocroi (2005) includes the Pleurotomarioidea in the Vetigastropoda, following Ponder and Lindberg (1997), but refers to the Vetigastropoda simply as a clade.

=== 2008 taxonomy ===
P. J. Wagner 2008 includes the superfamily Pleurotomarioidea, (ex Pleurotomariacea) in the suborder Pleurotomariina and superorder Vetigastropoda. This is an as yet (September 2010) unpublished opinion by Wagner.
