= Leslie Reginald Cox =

English palaeontologist, malacologist, and geologist

- Born: 22 November 1897
- Died: 5 August 1965 (aged 67)
- Awards: Fellow of the Royal Society (1950); Lyell Medal (1956)
- Scientific career
- Fields: Malacology; Paleontology

Leslie Reginald Cox FRS (22 November 1897, Islington – 5 August 1965) was an English palaeontologist and malacologist.

== Education and career ==
Cox was born to parents who worked as government servants, in the Post Office telephone engineers' department. When he was still young, the family moved to Harringay, where at age six he started attendance at the South Harringay County School. In 1909, he entered Owen's School in Islington, one of the old London grammar schools.

In August 1916, Cox began his war service, serving in the Experimental Section of the Royal Naval Air Service (later of the Royal Navy). He was wounded at Zeebrugge in 1918 whilst involved in an assault party. Upon demobilisation he read natural sciences at Queens' College, Cambridge, graduating with a double first in 1921.

Cox was made assistant keeper of the Geology Department of the British Museum in 1922. He was promoted to senior principal scientific officer in 1951, and ended his career as deputy keeper of the museum's Palaeontology Department, retiring in 1963.

== Awards and honours ==
Cox was elected a Fellow of the Royal Society in 1950. His nomination reads:

Dr. L.R. Cox is one of the leading authorities on fossil Lamellibranchiate and Gastropoda. His work at the British Museum has enabled him to study material from almost all parts of the world, and the results of his researches have been published in the transactions of learned bodies in at least ten countries. Although his contributions to Mesozoic and Cainozoic Palaeoconchology are widely recognised as important and sound, his work on the Jurassic Lamellibranchiata is outstanding. In addition to his systematic studies, he has made illuminating researches of an historical kind, especially in respect of the life and work of William Smith.

He was elected president of the Geologists' Association for 1954–56.

== Publications ==
Cox's most important publications include:

- The fauna of the basal shell-bed of the Portland Stone, Isle of Portland. Proceedings of the Dorset natural-historical and archeological Society, 1925.– Vol. 46.– p. 113-172, pls. 1-5.
- Synopsis of the Lamellibranchia and Gastropoda of the Portland beds of England. Part I.// Proceedings of the Dorset natural-historical and archeological Society, 1929.– Vol. 50.– p. 131-202.
- Fossil Mollusca from southern Persia (Iran) and Bahrei Island.// Memoirs of the Geological Survey of India. Palaeontologia indica, 1936.– N. S., vol. 22, mem. №2.– ii+69 pp., 8 pls.
- A survey of the Mollusca of the British Great Oolite series primarily a nomenclatorial revision of the monographs by Morris et Lycett (1851-1855), Lycett (1836) and Blake (1905-1907). Part II.// Palaeontographical Society. Monographs, 1950.– Vol. 105, №449. – p. 49-105. (together with W. J. Arkell)
- Cretaceous and Eocene fossils from the Gold Coast.// Gold Coast Geological Survey. Bulletin, 1952.– №17.– 68 pp., 5 pls.
- The British Cretaceous Pleurotomariidae.// The Bulletin of the British Museum (Natural History). Geology, 1960.– p. 385-423, 1 fig., pls. 44-60.
- The molluscan fauna and probable Lower Cretaceous age of the Nanutarra formation of Western Australia.// Department of National Development. Bureau of Mineral Resources, Geology and Geophysics. Bulletin, 1961.– №61.– 53 pp., 1 fig., 7 pls.
- Jurassic Bivalvia and Gastropoda from Tanganyika and Kenya.// Bulletin of the British Museum (Natural History). Geology, 1965.– Suppl. 1.– 213 pp., 2 figs., 30 pls.
