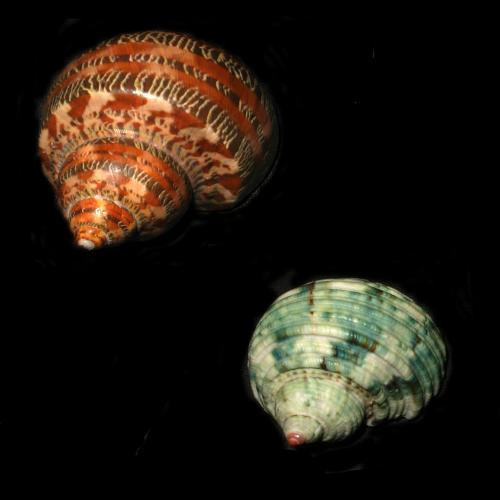
- shells of Turbo spp.

Scientific classification
- Domain: Eukaryota
- Kingdom: Animalia
- Phylum: Mollusca
- Class: Gastropoda
- Order: "Archaeogastropoda"; Thiele, 1925

Families
- See text

= Archaeogastropoda =

Archaeogastropoda Temporal range: Late Cambrian–Recent

Obsolete order of gastropods

Archaeogastropoda (also known as Aspidobranchia) was a taxonomic order of snails used in older classifications of gastropods, i.e. snails and slugs. Archeogastropoda are primarily marine prosobranch gastropod mollusks, mainly herbivores, typically having two gills and a double-chambered heart, with the eggs and sperm discharged directly into the water, excepting terrestrial species. They were traditionally regarded as a relatively primitive group.

This older classification of the gastropods is based on the classification of Johannes Thiele (1925). This classification was not based on true phylogenetic relationships, but on more general affinities between the groups. In the last few years, two new cladistic taxonomies of the gastropods have been published (in 1997 and 2005). This has led to an extensive reclassification of gastropod taxa. The taxon Archaeogastropoda was found to be a paraphyletic group, and therefore unacceptable in a strictly cladistic classification.

In the 1997 classification, most of the former Archaeogastropoda were included in:

- subclass Eogastropoda
  - order Patellogastropoda (limpets)
- subclass Orthogastropoda
  - Superorder Vetigastropoda Salvini-Plawen, 1989
  - Superorder Neritaemorphi Koken, 1896 (with the order Neritopsina Cox & Knight, 1960).

A more detailed classification can be found on Gastropoda.

== Older system of classification ==
- Order Archaeogastropoda
  - Superfamily Pleurotomariacea
    - Family Pleurotomariidae
    - Family Haliotidae
    - Family Scissurellidae
  - Superfamily Fissurellacea
    - Family Fissurellidae
  - Superfamily Patellacea
    - Family Patellidae
    - Family Acmaeidae
    - Family Lepetidae
  - Superfamily Trochacea
    - Family Calliostomatidae
    - Family Trochidae
    - Family Stomatellidae
    - Family Cyclostrematidae
    - Family Turbinidae
    - Family Phasianellidae
  - Superfamily Neritacea
    - Family Neritidae
    - Family Helicinidae
    - Family Hydrocenidae

== See also ==
- Janospira
