= 2024 in paleomalacology =

This list of fossil molluscs described in 2024 is a list of new taxa of fossil molluscs that were described during the year 2024, as well as other significant discoveries and events related to molluscan paleontology that occurred in 2024.

== Ammonites ==
| Name | Novelty | Status | Authors | Age | Type locality | Location | Notes | Image |
|---|---|---|---|---|---|---|---|---|
| Acanthodiscus marocanus | Sp. nov | | Bryers et al. | Early Cretaceous (Hauterivian) | | Morocco | | |
| Acantholytoceras thomeli | Sp. nov | Valid | Delanoy, Baudouin & Agostini | Early Cretaceous (Barremian) | | France | | |
| Acrioceratoides | Gen. et comb. nov | | Cooper | Cretaceous | | South Africa | A new genus for "Acrioceras" zulu Klinger & Kennedy (1992). | |
| Afromaenioceras bensaidi | Sp. nov | Valid | Bockwinkel & Korn | Devonian (Givetian) | | Morocco | A member of the family Maenioceratidae. | |
| Afromaenioceras brumale | Sp. nov | Valid | Bockwinkel & Korn | Devonian (Givetian) | | Morocco | A member of the family Maenioceratidae. | |
| Afromaenioceras hiemale | Sp. nov | Valid | Bockwinkel & Korn | Devonian (Givetian) | | Morocco | A member of the family Maenioceratidae. | |
| Alabushevites | Gen. et comb. nov | | Cooper | Late Cretaceous (Santonian) | | Russia | A new genus for "Polyptychoceras" sakhalinum Alabushev & Wiedmann (1997). | |
| Alatyroceras | Gen. et comb. nov | Valid | Mitta | Middle Jurassic (Bathonian) | | Russia | A member of the family Cardioceratidae belonging to the subfamily Arctocephalitinae. The type species is "Paracadoceras" nageli Mitta (2005); genus also includes "Paracadoceras" keuppi Mitta (2005), "Paracadoceras" efimovi Mitta (2005) and "Cadoceras (Catacadoceras)" infimum Gulyaev & Kiselev (1999). | |
| Algoiceras | Gen. et comb. nov | | Cooper | Cretaceous | | South Africa | A new genus for "Hamites" africanus Tate (1867). | |
| Altudostephanus | Gen. et sp. nov | Valid | Bert et al. | Early Cretaceous (Valanginian) | Vocontian Basin | France | A member of the family Olcostephanidae. The type species is A. longicostis. | |
| Anatetragonites | Gen. et comb. nov | | Cooper | Cretaceous | | | A new genus for "Ammonites" jurinianus Pictet (1848). | |
| Arkadieviceras | Gen. et comb. nov | | Cooper | Early Cretaceous (Berriasian) | | Crimea | A new genus for "Bochianites" ambiguus Arkadiev, Rogov & Perminov (2011). | |
| Arnouldsagetia | Gen. et comb. nov | | Cooper | Early Cretaceous | | Tunisia | A new genus for "Protancyloceras" punicum Arnould-Saget (1951). | |
| Askerswellites | Gen. et comb. nov | | Cooper | Late Cretaceous (Cenomanian) | | United Kingdom | A new genus for "Protacanthoceras" tegulicium Wright & Kennedy (1980). | |
| Astrodiscitella | Nom. nov | | Cooper | Cretaceous | | Kazakhstan | A replacement name for Astrodiscus Savel'ev (1973). The type species is "Vnigriceras (Astrodiscus)" insegestum Savel'ev (1973). | |
| Bakonyceras transcarpathiensis | Sp. nov | Valid | Meister et al. | Early Jurassic | Perechyn Formation | Ukraine | | |
| Baylissites | Gen. et comb. nov | | Cooper | Late Cretaceous (Cenomanian) | | United Kingdom | A new genus for "Protacanthoceras" proteus Wright & Kennedy (1980). | |
| Begastrella | Gen. et comb. nov | | Cooper | Early Cretaceous | | Spain | A new genus for "Oosterella" begastrensis Company (1987). | |
| Beloventer | Gen. et comb. nov | | Cooper | Cretaceous | | United States | A new genus for "Mortoniceras (Deiradoceras)" beloventer Kennedy et al. (1999). | |
| Binckhorstella | Gen. et comb. nov | | Cooper | Cretaceous | | | A new genus for "Ammonites" colligatus Binckhorst (1861). | |
| Brendaites | Gen. et comb. nov | | Cooper | Cretaceous | | United States | A new genus for "Prionotropis" branneri Anderson (1902). | |
| Catumbellaites | Gen. et comb. nov | | Cooper | Cretaceous | | Angola | A new genus for "Neokentroceras" trituberculatum Howarth (1965). | |
| Caucasiptychoceras | Gen. et comb. nov | | Cooper | Cretaceous | | | A new genus for "Ptychoceras" renngarteni Egoian (1968). | |
| Chikkimites | Gen. et comb. nov | | Cooper | Early Cretaceous | Giumal Formation | India | A new genus for "Cleoniceras" oberhauseri Lukeneder, Suttner & Bertle (2013). | |
| Churkites subungunensis | Sp. nov | Valid | Zakharov et al. | Early Triassic (Olenekian) | | Russia | A member of the family Arctoceratidae. | |
| Churkites ungunensis | Sp. nov | Valid | Zakharov et al. | Early Triassic (Olenekian) | | Russia | A member of the family Arctoceratidae. | |
| Cinctibrancoceras | Gen. et comb. nov | | Cooper | Early Cretaceous (Albian) | | France | A new genus for "Brancoceras" magneti Collignon (1949). | |
| Cognacella | Gen. et comb. nov | | Cooper | Cretaceous | | France | A new genus for "Schloenbachia" boreaui de Grossouvre (1894). | |
| Collignonicerites | Gen. et comb. nov | | Cooper | Cretaceous | | United States | A new genus for "Ammonites" percarinatus Hall & Meek (1856). The generic name is shared with Collignonicerites Kennedy, Cobban & Landman (2001) | |
| Companyceras | Gen. et comb. nov | | Cooper | Early Cretaceous | | Spain | A new genus for "Saynoceras" contestanum Company (1985). | |
| Delametteiceras | Gen. et comb. nov | | Cooper | Early Cretaceous | | France | A new genus for "Neophlycticeras" rhodanense Delamette (1983). | |
| Delanoyiceras | Gen. et comb. nov | | Cooper | Early Cretaceous | | France | A new genus for "Neocosmoceras" flabelliforme Le Hégarat (1973). | |
| Dieniites | Gen. et comb. nov | | Cooper | Early Cretaceous (Albian) | | Italy | A new genus for "Hamites (Metahamites)" dalpiazi Wiedmann & Dieni (1968). | |
| Drushchitzia | Gen. et comb. nov | | Cooper | Early Cretaceous | | | A new genus for "Ammonites" duvalianus d'Orbigny (1842). | |
| Dumasiceras | Gen. et comb. nov | | Cooper | Early Cretaceous (Aptian) | | Kazakhstan | A new genus for "Crioceras" lahuseni Sinzow (1906). | |
| Ebisuites | Gen. et comb. nov | Disputed | Cooper | Late Cretaceous | | Japan | A new genus for "Heteroceras" japonicum Yabe (1904). Whittingham et al. (2026) did not consider this genus to be valid, and designated "Heteroceras" japonicum as the type species of the new genus Limusoceras. | |
| Elninoceras | Gen. et comb. nov | | Cooper | Cretaceous | | Madagascar | A new genus for "Eulophoceras" jacobi Hourcq (1949). | |
| Emilavramia | Gen. et comb. nov | | Cooper | Early Cretaceous | | Bulgaria | A new genus for "Hamulina" subalternata Breskovski (1966). | |
| Eolewesiceras | Gen. et comb. nov | | Cooper | Late Cretaceous (Cenomanian) | | Germany | A new genus for "Lewesiceras" cenomanense Wiedmann (1962). | |
| Epideroceras inflatum | Sp. nov | Valid | Meister et al. | Early Jurassic | Perechyn Formation | Ukraine | | |
| Epideroceras kalinichenkoi | Sp. nov | Valid | Meister et al. | Early Jurassic | Perechyn Formation | Ukraine | | |
| Epideroceras kruglovi | Sp. nov | Valid | Meister et al. | Early Jurassic | Perechyn Formation | Ukraine | | |
| Epideroceras pliensbachiensis | Sp. nov | Valid | Meister et al. | Early Jurassic | Perechyn Formation | Ukraine | | |
| Epideroceras sykorai | Sp. nov | Valid | Meister et al. | Early Jurassic | Perechyn Formation | Ukraine | | |
| Epigabbioceras | Gen. et comb. nov | | Cooper | | | | A new genus for "Ammonites" michelianum d'Orbigny (1850). | |
| Epikossmaticeras | Gen. et comb. nov | | Cooper | Cretaceous | | Japan | A new genus for "Kossmaticeras" japonicum Matsumoto (1955). | |
| Eurokossmaticeras | Gen. et comb. nov | | Cooper | Late Cretaceous | | Austria | A new genus for "Ammonites" brandti Redtenbacher (1873). | |
| Futakamiites | Gen. et comb. nov | | Cooper | Early Cretaceous (Aptian) | | Japan | A new genus for "Ammonites" subcornuerianus Shimizu (1931). | |
| Gabbioceras orientale | Sp. nov | Valid | Shigeta & Izukura | Early Cretaceous (Albian) | | Japan | A member of the family Tetragonitidae. | |
| Galloisiceras | Gen. et comb. nov | | Cooper | Cretaceous | | | A new genus for "Dipoloceras" subdelaruei Spath (1931). | |
| Gerhardtia ultima | Sp. nov | | Bert & Bersac | Early Cretaceous (Barremian) | | France | A member of the family Pulchelliidae. | |
| Gradinaruites | Gen. et sp. nov | Valid | Balini & Lăcătuş in Balini et al. | Middle Triassic (Anisian) | | Indonesia; Romania | A member of the family Cladiscitidae. The type species is G. aegeicus. | |
| Guanlingoceras | Gen. et sp. nov | | Mao et al. | Late Triassic (Carnian) | Xiaowa Formation | China | Genus includes new species G. guanlingensis. | |
| Hanhaites | Gen. et comb. nov | | Cooper | Cretaceous | | Angola | A new genus for "Hysteroceras" falcicostatum Haas (1942). | |
| Haroella | Gen. et sp. nov | | Bulot & Pictet in Bryers et al. | Early Cretaceous (Hauterivian) | | France; Morocco | A member of the family Neocomitidae belonging to the subfamily Endemoceratinae. The type species is H. charcensis. | |
| Hattinites | Gen. et comb. nov | | Cooper | Late Cretaceous (Cenomanian) | | United States | A new genus for "Eucalycoceras" templetonense Cobban (1988). | |
| Hendersoniceras | Gen. et comb. nov | | Cooper | Late Cretaceous | | New Zealand | A new genus for "Anagaudryceras" tennenti Henderson (1970). | |
| Hokkaidoites | Gen. et comb. nov | | Cooper | Late Cretaceous (Turonian) | | Japan | A new genus for "Hyphantoceras" heteromorphum Matsumoto (1977). | |
| Hookiceras | Gen. et comb. nov | | Cooper | Late Cretaceous | | United States | A new genus for "Moremanoceras" costatum Cobban, Hook & Kennedy (1989). | |
| Hughowenites | Gen. et comb. nov | | Cooper | Cretaceous | | Italy | A new genus for "Acanthoceras" pseudolyelli Parona & Bonarelli (1897). The generic name is shared with Hughowenites Lehmann, Solarczyk & Friedrich (2011). | |
| Idiohamitella | Gen. et comb. nov | | Cooper | Early Cretaceous (Albian) | | United Kingdom | A new genus for "Idiohamites" ellipticoides Spath (1934). | |
| Ixioniceras | Gen. et comb. nov | | Cooper | Cretaceous | | | A new genus for "Ammonites" ixion d'Orbigny (1841). | |
| Johndixonites | Gen. et comb. nov | | Cooper | Late Cretaceous | | Madagascar | A new genus for "Prionocycloceras" multicostatum Collignon (1965). | |
| Jolyites | Gen. et comb. nov | | Cooper | Early Cretaceous (Aptian) | | | A member of the family Hypophylloceratidae; a new genus for "Ammonites" belus d'Orbigny (1841). | |
| Juigneticeras | Gen. et comb. nov | | Cooper | Cretaceous | | Tunisia | A new genus for "Neolobites" fourteaui Pervinquière (1907). | |
| Jukesbrowneia | Gen. et comb. nov | | Cooper | Early Cretaceous (Albian) | | United Kingdom | A new genus for "Mortoniceras (Pervinquieria)" potternense Spath (1932). | |
| Karakaschella | Gen. et comb. nov | | Cooper | Cretaceous | | Crimea | A new genus for "Astieria" cadoceroides Karakasch (1907). | |
| Katerinella | Gen. et comb. nov | | Cooper | Cretaceous | | South Africa | A new genus for "Oxytropidoceras (Manuaniceras)" falcatum Kennedy & Klinger (2011). | |
| Keithyoungites | Gen. et comb. nov | | Cooper | Cretaceous | | United States | A new genus for "Manuaniceras" powelli Young (1966). | |
| Kollmanniceras | Gen. et comb. nov | | Cooper | Early Cretaceous (Albian) | | France | A new genus for "Oxytropidoceras (Mirapelia)" advena Kennedy in Kennedy et al. (2000). | |
| Kurdestanella | Gen. et comb. nov | | Cooper | Late Cretaceous | Shinarish Formation | Iraq | A member of the family Nostoceratidae. The type species is "Nostoceras" ellipticum Kennedy (2000). | |
| Kyushuites | Gen. et comb. nov | | Cooper | Cretaceous | | Japan | A new genus for "Lewesiceras" kawashitai Matsumoto (1979). | |
| Lafresnayella | Gen. et comb. nov | | Cooper | Cretaceous | | | A new genus for "Ammonites" lafresnayanus d'Orbigny (1841). | |
| Lambirisites | Gen. et comb. nov | | Cooper | Late Cretaceous (Cenomanian) | | India | A new genus for "Ammonites" coleroonensis Stoliczka (1866). | |
| Laqueoceratites | Nom. nov | | Cooper | Early Cretaceous (Aptian) | | Colombia | A replacement name for Laqueoceras Kakabadze & Hoedemaeker (2004). | |
| Lautidiscus | Gen. et comb. nov | | Cooper | Cretaceous | | | A new genus for "Ammonites" diversecostatus Coquand (1880). | |
| Leptosphinctes (Kubanoceras) bolshensis | Sp. nov | Valid | Mitta | Middle Jurassic (Bajocian) | | Russia (Karachay-Cherkessia) | A member of the family Perisphinctidae. | |
| Lukenedera | Gen. et comb. nov | | Cooper | Cretaceous | | | A new genus for "Hamites (Hamulina)" lorioli Uhlig (1883). | |
| Lytobaculites | Gen. et comb. nov | | Cooper | Late Cretaceous | | United States | A new genus for "Baculites" chicoensis Trask (1856). | |
| Maenioceras afroterebratum | Sp. nov | Valid | Bockwinkel & Korn | Devonian (Givetian) | | Morocco | A member of the family Maenioceratidae. | |
| Maenioceras beckeri | Sp. nov | Valid | Bockwinkel & Korn | Devonian (Givetian) | | Morocco | A member of the family Maenioceratidae. | |
| Maenioceras mzerrebense | Sp. nov | Valid | Bockwinkel & Korn | Devonian (Givetian) | | Morocco | A member of the family Maenioceratidae. | |
| Maenioceras oufranense | Sp. nov | Valid | Bockwinkel & Korn | Devonian (Givetian) | | Morocco | A member of the family Maenioceratidae. | |
| Malganisoceras | Gen. et comb. nov | | Cooper | Early Cretaceous (Albian) | | Madagascar | A new genus for "Protanisoceras" convexum Collignon (1963). | |
| Mangyschlakiceras | Gen. et comb. nov | | Cooper | Cretaceous | | Kazakhstan | A new genus for "Leymeriella" brevicostata Savel'ev (1973). | |
| Manyolaites | Gen. et comb. nov | | Cooper | Early Cretaceous (Aptian) | | South Africa | A new genus for "Australiceras" wandalina Klinger & Kennedy (1977). | |
| Matsumotoites | Gen. et comb. nov | | Cooper | Late Cretaceous (Cenomanian) | | Japan | A new genus for "Euomphaloceras" asura Matsumoto & Muramoto (1960). | |
| Mauryiceras | Gen. et comb. nov | | Cooper | Cretaceous | | Brazil | A new genus for "Ammonites" sergipensis White (1887). | |
| Mazenotella | Gen. et comb. nov | | Cooper | Cretaceous | | France | A new genus for "Neocomites" suprajurensis Mazenot (1939). | |
| Mirapelioides | Gen. et comb. nov | | Cooper | Early Cretaceous (Albian) | | France | A new genus for "Brancoceras" carinatum Collignon (1949). | |
| Mitraikyella | Gen. et sp. nov | | Cooper | Late Cretaceous | | Madagascar | A member of the family Nostoceratidae. The type species is M. collignoni. | |
| Mortoniceras (Deiradoceras) aldakor | Sp. nov | | López-Horgue & Owen | Early Cretaceous (Albian) | | Spain | A member of the family Brancoceratidae belonging to the subfamily Mortoniceratinae. | |
| Mortoniceras (Deiradoceras) armintzekalensis | Sp. nov | | López-Horgue & Owen | Early Cretaceous (Albian) | | Spain | A member of the family Brancoceratidae belonging to the subfamily Mortoniceratinae. | |
| Mortoniceras (Mortoniceras) aitzindari | Sp. nov | | López-Horgue & Owen | Early Cretaceous (Albian) | Valmaseda Formation | Spain | A member of the family Brancoceratidae belonging to the subfamily Mortoniceratinae. | |
| Mortoniceras (Mortoniceras) juleni | Sp. nov | | López-Horgue & Owen | Early Cretaceous (Albian) | Valmaseda Formation | Spain | A member of the family Brancoceratidae belonging to the subfamily Mortoniceratinae. | |
| Navarreites | Gen et sp. nov | | López-Horgue & Owen | Early Cretaceous (Albian) | | Spain | A member of the family Brancoceratidae belonging to the subfamily Mortoniceratinae. The type species is N. egiarretensis. | |
| Neodistoloceras | Gen. et comb. nov | | Cooper | Cretaceous | | Germany | A new genus for "Crioceras" roemeri Neumayr & Uhlig (1881). | |
| Neodouvilleiceras | Gen. et comb. nov | | Cooper | Early Cretaceous (Albian) | | Madagascar | A new genus for "Douvilleiceras" benonae Besairie (1936). | |
| Neoforbesiceras | Gen. et comb. nov | | Cooper | Cretaceous | | United Kingdom | A new genus for "Ammonites" obtectus Sharpe (1855). | |
| Neogardeniceras | Gen. et comb. nov | | Cooper | Cretaceous | | India | A new genus for "Ammonites" rembda Forbes (1846). | |
| Neotarrantoceras | Gen. et comb. nov | | Cooper | Late Cretaceous (Cenomanian) | | United States | A new genus for "Acanthoceras" cuspidum Stephenson (1953). | |
| Nicklesiceras | Gen. et comb. nov | | Cooper | Cretaceous | | Spain | A new genus for "Mortoniceras" gaudryi Nicklès (1892). | |
| Nodosoppelia | Gen. et comb. nov | | Cooper | Cretaceous | | South Africa | A new genus for "Sanmartinoceras (Theganoceras)" nodosum Kennedy & Klinger (1979). | |
| Olorizia calandensis | Sp. nov | | Moliner | Late Jurassic | | Spain | A member of the family Ataxioceratidae. | |
| Oweniceras | Gen. et comb. nov | | Cooper | Cretaceous | | United Kingdom | A new genus for "Mortoniceras (Pervinquieria)" geometricum Spath (1932). | |
| Pachyphylloceras | Gen. et comb. nov | | Cooper | Cretaceous (Valanginian-Maastrichtian) | | | A member of the family Phyllopachyceratidae; a new genus for "Ammonites" forbesianus d'Orbigny (1850). | |
| Parafagesia | Gen. et comb. nov | | Cooper | Late Cretaceous (Turonian) | | India | A new genus for "Ammonites" rudra Stoliczka (1865). | |
| Paranaklinoceras | Gen. et comb. nov | | Cooper | Late Cretaceous | | Colombia | A new genus for "Nostoceras" liratum Kennedy (1992). | |
| Pariatamboites | Gen. et comb. nov | | Cooper | Cretaceous | | Peru | A new genus for "Ammonites" carbonarius Gabb (1877). | |
| Parvicornutites | Gen. et comb. nov | | Cooper | Cretaceous | | | A new genus for "Ammonites" cornutus Pictet & Campiche (1854). | |
| Pernoceras kirsaense | Sp. nov | Valid | Becker | Devonian | | Russia | A member of the family Tornoceratidae belonging to the subfamily Aulatornoceratidae. | |
| Phindaites | Gen. et comb. nov | | Cooper | Late Cretaceous (Cenomanian) | | South Africa | A new genus for "Acanthoceras" cornigerum Crick (1907). | |
| Phyllopachyceratoides | Gen. et comb. nov | | Cooper | Early Cretaceous (Albian) | | Madagascar | A member of the family Phyllopachyceratidae; a new genus for "Phyllopachyceras" betiokyense Collignon (1963). | |
| Plesioscaphites | Gen. et comb. nov | | Cooper | Late Cretaceous | | United Kingdom | A new genus for "Eoscaphites" chardensis Wright & Kennedy (1996). | |
| Powellites | Gen. et comb. nov | | Cooper | Late Cretaceous | | United States | A new genus for "Mammites" powelli Kennedy, Wright & Hancock (1987). | |
| Praeclariella | Gen. et comb. nov | | Cooper | Cretaceous | | United States | A new genus for "Forbesiceras" brundrettei Young (1958). | |
| Protornoceras rhenicum | Sp. nov | Valid | Becker | Devonian | | Germany | A member of the family Tornoceratidae belonging to the subfamily Aulatornoceratidae. | |
| Prowatinoceras | Gen. et comb. nov | | Cooper | Late Cretaceous (Cenomanian) | | United States | A new genus for "Neocardioceras" transiens Kennedy, Cobban & Landman (1996). | |
| Prozelandites | Gen. et comb. nov | | Cooper | Cretaceous | | France | A new genus for "Desmoceras" dozei Fallot (1885). | |
| Pseudohoepenites | Gen. et comb. nov | | Cooper | Late Cretaceous | | South Africa | A new genus for "Pachydiscus" antecursor van Hoepen (1921). | |
| Pseudomammites | Gen. et comb. nov | | Cooper | Late Cretaceous (Turonian) | | United States | A new genus for "Acanthoceras" coloradoense Henderson (1908). | |
| Pseudometoicoceras | Gen. et comb. nov | | Cooper | Cretaceous | | Madagascar | A new genus for "Metoicoceras" fasciculatum Collignon (1964). | |
| Pseudoperoniceras | Gen. et comb. nov | | Cooper | Cretaceous | | South Africa | A new genus for "Paratexanites" australis Klinger & Kennedy (1980). | |
| Quimbalaites | Gen. et comb. nov | | Cooper | Late Cretaceous (Campanian) | | Angola | A new genus for "Didymoceras" subtuberculatum Howarth (1965). | |
| Regifexiceras | Gen. et comb. nov | | Cooper | Early Cretaceous | | Bulgaria | A new genus for "Bochianites" nodosocostatus Mandov (1971). | |
| Robinsonites simionescui | Sp. nov | Valid | Balini & Lăcătuş in Balini et al.Balini et al. | Middle Triassic (Anisian) | | Romania | A member of Ceratitoidea of uncertain affinities. | |
| Rouchadzeiceras | Gen. et sp. nov | | Cooper | Early Cretaceous (Barremian) | | Georgia | The type species is R. rouchadzei. | |
| Sasonovaites | Gen. et comb. nov | | Cooper | Late Jurassic | | Russia | A new genus for "Craspedites" parakaschpuricus Gerassimova (1969). | |
| Saxbyites | Gen. et comb. nov | | Cooper | Late Cretaceous (Cenomanian) | | United Kingdom | A new genus for "Ammonites" saxbii Sharpe (1857). | |
| Schoendelmayerites | Gen. et comb. nov | | Cooper | Early Cretaceous | | Switzerland | A new genus for "Bochianites" oosteri Sarasin & Schöndelmayer (1902). | |
| Shastalytoceras | Gen. et comb. nov | | Cooper | Early Cretaceous (Hauterivian-Barremian) | | United States | A member of the family Lytoceratidae; a new genus for "Ammonites" batesi Trask (1855). | |
| Shimizuites | Gen. et comb. nov | | Cooper | Late Cretaceous | | Japan | A new genus for "Anagaudlyceras" howarthi Matsumoto (1995). | |
| Skoenbergiceras | Gen. et comb. nov | | Cooper | Late Cretaceous (Cenomanian) | | South Africa | A new genus for "Gaudryceras" stefaninii Venzo (1936). | |
| Skoenbergites | Gen. et comb. nov | | Cooper | Late Cretaceous (Cenomanian) | | Madagascar | A new genus for "Acanthoceras (Mantelliceras)" falloti Collignon (1931). | |
| Sornayella | Gen. et comb. nov | | Cooper | Late Cretaceous | | France | A new genus for "Prionotropis" turoniense Sornay (1951). | |
| Sougraignites | Gen. et comb. nov | | Cooper | Cretaceous | | France | A new genus for "Pachydiscus" jeani de Grossouvre (1894). | |
| Stenoglaphyrites isetensis | Sp. nov | Valid | Nikolaeva in Nikolaeva et al. | Carboniferous (Serpukhovian) | | Russia | | |
| Stephensonites | Gen. et comb. nov | | Cooper | Cretaceous | | United States | A new genus for "Acanthoceras" lonsdalei Adkins (1928). | |
| Suevisphinctes | Gen. et sp. nov | Valid | Scherzinger et al. | Late Jurassic (Tithonian) | Hangende-Bankkalke Formation | Germany | A member of the family Perisphinctidae belonging to the subfamily Torquatisphinctinae. The type species is S. josefkelleri. | |
| Tetragonites pusillus | Sp. nov | Valid | Shigeta & Maeda | Late Cretaceous (Maastrichtian) | | Russia (Sakhalin Oblast) | A member of the family Tetragonitidae. | |
| Titanoleioceras | Gen. et sp. nov | | Kennedy, Kelly & Schneider | Late Cretaceous (Cenomanian) | Sorgenfri Formation | Greenland | A member of the family Tetragonitidae. The type species is T. boreale. | |
| Tornoceras chutense | Sp. nov | Valid | Korn | Devonian | | Russia | | |
| Transcarpathiceras | Gen. et sp. nov | Valid | Meister et al. | Early Jurassic | Perechyn Formation | Ukraine | Genus includes new species T. ukrainiensis. | |
| Transkiella | Gen. et comb. nov | | Cooper | Late Cretaceous (Santonian-Campanian) | | South Africa | A member of the family Hypophylloceratidae; a new genus for "Phylloceras" woodsi van Hoepen (1921). | |
| Trimaenioceras | Gen. et 4 sp. nov | Valid | Bockwinkel & Korn | Devonian (Givetian) | | Morocco | A member of the family Maenioceratidae. The type species is T. klugi; genus also includes T. eculeus, T. fuscina and T. paucum. | |
| Tuberokosmatella | Gen. et comb. nov | | Cooper | Cretaceous | | Italy | A new genus for "Kosmatella" schindewolfi Wiedmann & Dieni (1968). | |
| Tuberophylloceras | Gen. et comb. nov | | Cooper | Cretaceous | | Madagascar | A new genus for "Epiphylloceras" cottreaui Collignon (1956). | |
| Umzambiceras | Gen. et comb. nov | | Cooper | Late Cretaceous (Santonian) | | South Africa | A member of the family Phyllopachyceratidae; a new genus for "Phylloceras" umzambiense van Hoepen (1920). | |
| Vermeulenites | Gen. et comb. nov | | Cooper | | | | A new genus for "Paquiericeras" mourrei Vermeulen (1972). | |
| Vonkoenenites | Gen. et comb. nov | | Cooper | Early Cretaceous | | Germany | A new genus for "Crioceras" curvicostata von Koenen (1902). | |
| Wakaneneites | Gen. et comb. nov | | Cooper | Cretaceous | | New Zealand | A new genus for "Glyptoxoceras" wakanenei Henderson (1970). | |
| Welwitschiella | Gen. et comb. nov | | Cooper | Cretaceous | | Brazil | A new genus for "Puzosia" garajauana Maury (1930). | |
| Xenobaculus | Gen. et comb. nov | | Cooper | Late Cretaceous | | United States | A new genus for "Baculites" clinolobatus Elias (1933). | |

=== Ammonite research ===
- Evidence indicating that morphologically complex ammonoid taxa often had reduced longevity and higher origination and extinction rates compared to morphologically simple ones is presented by Miao et al. (2024).
- Morón-Alfonso, Allaire & Ginot (2024) compare the results of application of two methods used to analyze the ammonoid whorl profile shape, interpreting different methods as better suited for taxa with highly defined umbilical walls and for ones with smooth umbilical walls or with reduced whorl overlap.
- A study on the affinities of "Tornoceras" baldisi, based on data from new specimens from the Chigua Formation (Argentina), is published by Allaire et al. (2024), who transfer this species to the genus Epitornoceras, and interpret the uppermost levels of the Chavela Member of the Chigua Formation preserving its fossils as Givetian in age.
- Piñeiro, Rodao & Núñez Demarco (2024) describe clusters of tiny ammonite shells from the San Gregorio Formation (Uruguay), found in nodules interpreted as reworked from underlying Devonian levels, and interpret this findings as possible evidence that ammonites laid eggs in floating or fixed gelatinous masses and hatched as miniatures of their parents that shared the same habitat with adult ammonites.
- A study on the origin of the Permian ammonite superfamily Popanoceratoidea is published by Leonova (2024).
- Description of the Olenekian ammonite assemblage from the Osawa Formation (Japan), interpreted as indicative of affinities with ammonite faunas from South Primorye and from the Tethys, is published by Shigeta, Endo & Inose (2024).
- Taxonomic revision of Carnian ammonites from the Polzberg Lagerstätte (Austria) is published by Lukeneder & Lukeneder (2024).
- Mironenko & Smurova (2024) describe ammonite specimens from the Jurassic localities in Russia preserved with the three-dimensional cameral membranes in their phragmocones which differed in their spatial arrangement and complexity from those known in other ammonites, and study the formation of all types of ammonite cameral sheets.
- Mitta & Mironenko (2024) describe a large-sized upper jaw of a member of the genus Lytoceras from the Bajocian strata from the Kuban basin (Karachay-Cherkessia, Russia), representing the oldest complete jaw of this type and the only upper jaw of a member of Lytoceratina reported to date.
- Sandoval (2024) describes fossil material of Latiwitchellia evoluta from the Middle Jurassic strata from the Betic Cordillera (Spain), representing the first known record of this species outside Eastern Pacific, and interprets this finding as indicating that westernmost Tethys and Eastern Pacific domains were connected through the Hispanic Corridor during the early Bajocian.
- The earliest occurrence of genus Macrocephalites known to date is reported from the Bathonian Kachchh Basin (India) by Jain (2024).
- Description of Late Jurassic ammonites from the Spiti Shale Formation of the Spiti and Zanskar regions of the Himalayas (India) is published by Bhosale et al. (2024).
- López-Palomino, Villaseñor & Palma-Ramírez (2024) study the affinities of Late Jurassic ammonites from the Santiago Formation (Mexico), providing evidence of biogeographic affinities with ammonites from Cuba, Chile and Argentina, as well as evidence of existence of the connection between the Tethys Ocean and the Pacific throughout the Oxfordian.
- A study on the relationship between septal complexity and ammonite diversity during the Cretaceous is published by Pérez-Claros (2024), who finds no evidence of a close relationship between oceanic anoxic events throughout the Cretaceous and worldwide evolutionary dynamics of ammonites.
- A study on changes of conch shape and septal spacing between successive chambers in Cretaceous ammonites from India, Madagascar and Japan throughout their ontogeny, interpreted as indicative of closer phylogenetic relationships between Perisphinctina and Ancyloceratina than with Lytoceratina or Phylloceratina, is published by Nishino et al. (2024).
- Frau et al. (2024) designate the neotype for the Early Cretaceous ammonite species Ammonites flexisulcatus, and assign this species to the desmoceratid genus Caseyella.
- A study on the morphological variation of specimens of Placenticeras from the Upper Cretaceous strata of the eastern Gulf Coastal Plain (mostly from Alabama, United States) is published by Mohr, Tobin & Tompkins (2024), who interpret the studied sample as including either a single species or two successive species, find no support for the recognition of Placenticeras and Stantonoceras as distinct genera, and report likely evidence of sexual dimorphism.
- Evidence from oxygen isotope values of shell material of Late Cretaceous ammonites from the Western Interior Seaway, interpreted as indicative of ~18 °C cooling from the Cretaceous Thermal Maximum in the Turonian until the late Maastrichtian, is presented by McCraw et al. (2024).
- A study on the diversification dynamics of Late Cretaceous ammonites is published by Flannery-Sutherland et al. (2024), who find evidence of regional differences of diversity trends, but no evidence of a progressive global decline through the Late Cretaceous.

== Other cephalopods ==
| Name | Novelty | Status | Authors | Age | Type locality | Location | Notes | Images |
|---|---|---|---|---|---|---|---|---|
| Acanthonautilus grandis | Sp. nov | Valid | Shchedukhin | Permian | | Russia | | |
| Acanthonautilus permicus | Sp. nov | Valid | Shchedukhin | Permian | | Russia | | |
| Adamsoceras? hanusi | Sp. nov | Valid | Turek & Aubrechtová | Ordovician (Katian) | Králův Dvůr Formation | Czech Republic | A member of Actinocerida belonging to the family Ormoceratidae. | |
| Antaganides | Gen. et 3 sp. et comb. nov | Valid | Branger | Middle Jurassic | | France; Italy | A member of the family Pseudonautilidae. The type species is A. fournieri; genus also includes new species A. sauvageti and A. grulkei, as well as "Nautilus" erycinus Tagliarini (1901). | |
| Bactroceras cocafolium | Sp. nov | Valid | Kröger, Chacaltana & Gutiérrez-Marco | Ordovician (Floian) | San José Formation | Peru | | |
| Bolcaoctopus | Gen. et sp. nov | Valid | Mironenko et al. | Eocene (Ypresian) | Monte Bolca Lagerstätte | Italy | An octopus belonging to the group Incirrata. The type species is B. pesciaraensis. | |
| Duvalia arctica | Sp. nov | Valid | Mutterlose, Alsen & Picollier | Early Cretaceous (Barremian) | Stratumbjerg Formation | Greenland | A belemnite belonging to the group Belemnopseina and the family Duvaliidae. | |
| Haloites gionyamaensis | Sp. nov | Valid | Niko | Silurian | Gionyama Formation | Japan | A member of the family Pseudorthoceratidae. | |
| Phragmoteuthis polzbergensis | Sp. nov | Valid | Lukeneder, Fuchs & Lukeneder | Late Triassic (Carnian) | Polzberg Lagerstätte | Austria | | P. polzbergensis (left) |
| Pseudaganides aquitanense | Sp. nov | Valid | Branger | Middle Jurassic (Bathonian) | | France | A member of the family Pseudonautilidae. | |
| Pseudaganides buffeventi | Sp. nov | Valid | Branger | Middle Jurassic (Callovian) | | France | A member of the family Pseudonautilidae. | |
| Pseudaganides crechensis | Sp. nov | Valid | Branger | Middle Jurassic (Callovian) | | France | A member of the family Pseudonautilidae. | |
| Pseudaturoidea vermeuleni | Sp. nov | | Baudouin & Delanoy | Early Cretaceous (Barremian and Aptian) | | France | A member of the family Pseudonautilidae. | |
| Simoniteuthis | Gen. et sp. nov | | Fuchs, Weis & Thuy | Early Jurassic (Toarcian) | Schistes bitumineux | Luxembourg | A member of Vampyromorpha belonging to the group Loligosepiina and possibly to the family Loligosepiidae or Geopeltidae. The type species is S. michaelyi. | |
| Sinoeremoceras marywadeae | Sp. nov | Valid | Pohle, Jell & Klug | Cambrian (Furongian) | Ninmaroo Formation | Australia | A member of the family Plectronoceratidae. | |
| Tainoceras luxaeterna | Sp. nov | | Dernov | Carboniferous (Kasimovian or Gzhelian) | Avilovka Formation | Ukraine | | |
| Teudopsinia grossheidei | Sp. nov | Valid | Fuchs & Heyng | Late Jurassic (Tithonian) | | Germany | A member of Teudopseina belonging to the family Teudopsidae. | |
| Ticinoteuthis | Gen. et sp. nov | Valid | Pohle & Klug | Middle Triassic (Anisian) | Besano Formation | Switzerland | A member of Coleoidea of uncertain affinities. The type species is T. chuchichaeschtli. | |
| Trematoceras osawaense | Sp. nov | Valid | Niko & Ehiro | Early Triassic (Olenekian) | Osawa Formation | Japan | | |

=== Other cephalopod research ===
- A study on the shell morphology of Calorthoceras during its early ontogeny is published by Manda & Turek (2024), who assign the studied orthocerid to the family Dawsonoceratidae.
- A study on the morphological diversity of rhyncholites and rhynchoteuthis from the Triassic to present, providing evidence of previously unrecognized variation in the shape of nautilid beaks and their adaptations to diverse diets, is published by Souquet et al. (2024).
- Schweigert, Haye & Stössel (2024) report the discovery fossil material of Pictonautilus verciacensis from the upper Bathonian strata of Rotes Erzlager Member of the Wutach Formation (Germany) and upper Bathonian or lower Callovian strata in Poland, expanding known geographical range of the species, and interpret Nautilus (Paracenoceras) wilmae Jeannet (1951) as a junior synonym of "Paracenoceras" calloviense Oppel (1857).
- Evans et al. (2024) report the discovery of fossil material of Clarkeiteuthis montefiori from the Hettangian strata of the Blue Lias Formation (Somerset, United Kingdom), extending known range of diplobelids into the earliest Jurassic.
- New estimates for the body size of Megateuthis, including estimates of full body length of up to 2.17 m in M. suevica and possibly up to 3.11 m in M. elliptica, are presented by Klug et al. (2024).
- A study on calcite from Early Cretaceous belemnite rostra from the Mahajanga Basin (Madagascar), providing evidence of the Valanginian cooling event in the Southern Hemisphere, is published by Wang et al. (2024).
- Fossil material of Paraplesioteuthis sagittata and ?Loligosepia sp. indet. from the Toarcian strata of the Causses Basin (France), providing evidence of previously unrecognized diversity of gladius-bearing coleoids in the studied basin, is described by Jattiot et al. (2024), who argue that P. sagittata might have originated in the Mediterranean domain.
- New information on the anatomy of Dorateuthis syriaca and its variation among members of this species is presented by Rowe et al. (2024).
- Serafini et al. (2024) describe nautiloid jaw elements associated with marine reptile carcasses from the strata of the Rosso Ammonitico Veronese (Italy) ranging from the Bajocian to the Kimmeridgian, interpreted as the first unambiguous evidence of nautiloids scavenging Mesozoic marine reptile remains, as well as multiple belemnite specimens associated with the holotype of Neptunidraco ammoniticus, interpreted as likely evidence of mass mortality after spawning.
- Mironenko et al. (2024) describe an assemblage of cephalopod jaws from the upper Cenomanian–middle Turonian strata in Krasnoyarsk Krai (Russia), interpreted as remains of large-bodied ammonites and octobrachian coleoids.

== Bivalves ==
| Name | Novelty | Status | Authors | Age | Type locality | Location | Notes | Images |
|---|---|---|---|---|---|---|---|---|
| Acesta plioiberica | Sp. nov | Valid | Brunetti & Della Bella | Pliocene | | Spain | A member of the family Limidae. | |
| Actinopteria alba | Nom. nov | Valid | Pacaud in Coan, Pacaud & Kabat | Early Cretaceous (Albian) | | France | A member of the family Pterineidae; a replacement name for Avicula subradiata Leymerie (1842). | |
| Allopinna | Gen. et sp. nov | Valid | Yancey | Carboniferous | Glenshaw Formation | United States (Pennsylvania) | A pinnid bivalve. Genus includes new species A. godleskya. | |
| Amanocina bujensis | Sp. nov | | Hryniewicz et al. | Eocene | | Croatia | A lucinid bivalve. | |
| Anthonya albis | Nom. nov | Valid | Pacaud in Coan, Pacaud & Kabat | Early Cretaceous (Hauterivian) | | France | A replacement name for Pandora aequivalvis Leymerie (1842). | |
| Araripenomia | Gen. et sp. nov | | Guerrini et al. | Early Cretaceous | Romualdo Formation | Brazil | Genus includes new species A. infirma. | |
| Arctica bergensis | Sp. nov | Valid | Pouwer | Oligocene | Bilzen Formation | Belgium | A species of Arctica | |
| Australoeocallista | Gen. et sp. nov | | Guerrini et al. | Early Cretaceous | Romualdo Formation | Brazil | Genus includes new species A. juazeiroi. | |
| Aviculopinna phosphoria | Sp. nov | Valid | Yancey | Permian | Phosphoria Formation | United States (Wyoming) | A pinnid bivalve. | |
| Bamanboria | Gen. et sp. nov | | Shah & Patel | Paleogene | Bamanbor Formation | India | A member of Unionida belonging to the family Deccanoidae. The type species is B. oblongis. | |
| Brachidontes? amanoi | Sp. nov | | Hryniewicz et al. | Eocene | | Croatia | A mytilid bivalve. | |
| Channelaxinus dinaricus | Sp. nov | | Hryniewicz et al. | Eocene | | Croatia | A thyasirid bivalve. | |
| Charigonia | Gen. et comb. nov | Valid | Cooper | Jurassic | | India; Tanzania | A member of Trigoniida belonging to the family Vaugoniidae. The type species is "Trigonia" hispida Kitchin (1903); genus also includes "Trigonia" exortiva Kitchin (1903), "Trigonia" gracilis Kitchin (1903), "Trigonia" jumarensis Kitchin (1903), "Trigonia" kutchensis Kitchin (1903) and "Myophorella" quennelli Cox (1965). | |
| Chotilia | Gen. et 3 sp. nov | | Shah & Patel | Paleogene | Bamanbor Formation | India | A member of Unionida belonging to the family Deccanoidae. The type species is C. trappeansis; genus also includes C. tuberculata and C. deccanensis. | |
| Ciceromya | Gen. et sp. nov | | Guerrini et al. | Early Cretaceous | Romualdo Formation | Brazil | Genus includes new species C. edentulosa. | |
| Coelastarte wardenensis | Sp. nov | Valid | Knight, Collins & Morris | Early Jurassic | | United Kingdom | A member of the family Astartidae. | |
| Coralliophaga barbara | Comb. nov | Valid | (Studencka) | Miocene | | Poland | A member of the family Trapezidae; moved from Kelliella barbara Studencka (1987). | |
| Corbicula belenus | Nom. nov | Valid | Pacaud | Pleistocene (Gelasian) | | France | A species of Corbicula; a replacement name for Cyrena fluminalis trigona Tournouër (1866). | |
| Corbulomima delicata | Sp. nov | | Guerrini et al. | Early Cretaceous | Romualdo Formation | Brazil | | |
| Cornbrashella | Gen. et comb. nov | Valid | Ayoub-Hannaa et al. | Middle to Late Jurassic (Bajocian to Kimmeridgian) | Cornbrash Formation | Egypt; Ethiopia; France; India; Madagascar; Switzerland; United Kingdom | A member of the family Trigoniidae. The type species is "Trigonia" pullus Sowerby (1826); genus also includes C. distincta (Kitchin, 1903). | |
| Cotswoldella | Gen. et comb. nov | Valid | Ayoub-Hannaa et al. | Early to Late Jurassic (Sinemurian-Kimmeridgian) | Inferior Oolite | Argentina; Egypt; France; India; Israel; Italy; Kenya; United Kingdom; United States | A member of the family Trigoniidae. The type species is "Trigonia" hemisphaerica Lycett (1853); genus also includes C. culleni (Lycett, 1877), C. elegantissima (Meek, 1873), C. kidugalloensis (Cox, 1965), C. densestriata (Behrendsen, 1892), C. gadoisi (Cossmann, 1911), C. langrunensis (Bigot, 1893), C. parva (Kitchin, 1903) and C. ranvilliana (Bigot, 1893). | |
| Crassostrea vindinonensis | Nom. nov | Valid | Pacaud in Coan, Pacaud & Kabat | Miocene | | France | A species of Crassostrea; a replacement name for Ostrea gryphoides Deshayes (1825). | |
| Deccanoida | Gen. et 3 sp. nov | | Shah & Patel | Paleogene | Bamanbor Formation | India | A member of Unionida, the type genus of the new family Deccanoidae. The type species is D. conrugis; genus also includes D. aleta and D. costaria. | |
| Falcatopinna | Gen. et 3 sp. et comb. nov | Valid | Yancey | Carboniferous and Permian | | United States (Kansas; Nebraska; Texas) | A pinnid bivalve. The type species is F. meeki; genus also includes new species F. bobwilliamsi and F. winchelli, as well as "Aviculopinna" knighti Beede (1901). | |
| Fasciculodonta curvata | Sp. nov | | Wang et al. | Ordovician | Hsiangyang Formation | China | | |
| Flisopinna | Gen. et 2 sp. nov | Valid | Yancey | Permian | | United States (Texas) | A pinnid bivalve. Genus includes new species F. beadmontana and F. carteri. | |
| Gemmellopinna | Gen. et comb. nov | Valid | Yancey | Permian | | Italy | A pinnid bivalve. Genus includes G. credneri (Gemmellaro, 1892). | |
| Girtopinna | Gen. et 3 sp. et comb. nov | Valid | Yancey | Carboniferous and Permian | | United States (Kansas; New Mexico; Texas) | A pinnid bivalve. Genus includes new species G. wynnensis, G. jimflisi and G. robledana, as well as G. peracuta (Shumard in Shumard & Swallow, 1858). | |
| Glyptarca symmetrica | Sp. nov | | Wang et al. | Ordovician | Hsiangyang Formation | China | | |
| Grammatodon egortinus | Sp. nov | | Dominici, Danise & Tintori | Middle Triassic (Ladinian) | Pelsa-Vazzoler Lagerstätte | Italy | A member of the family Parallelodontidae. | |
| Hecuba mukerjeei | Sp. nov | Valid | Raven | Miocene (Aquitanian-Burdigalian) | Bagmara Formation | India | A member of the family Donacidae. | |
| Hoyosites | Gen. et sp. nov | | Gil et al. | Late Cretaceous (Turonian) | Villaescusa de las Torres Formation | Spain | A rudist bivalve belonging to the family Radiolitidae. The type species is H. tozoi. | |
| Iemanjavola | Gen. et sp. nov | Valid | Santelli et al. | Miocene (Burdigalian) | Pirabas Formation | Brazil | A scallop. The type species is I. monlafertei. | |
| Inversatella | Gen. et sp. nov | | Guerrini et al. | Early Cretaceous | Romualdo Formation | Brazil | Genus includes new species I. cearensis. | |
| Kolymopecten | Gen. et comb. et sp. nov | Valid | Biakov | Permian | | Russia | A pectinoid bivalve. The type species is K. kolymaensis (Maslennikow); genus also includes K. mutabilis (Licharew), as well as new species K. praekolymaensis. | |
| Laevopinna | Gen. et comb. nov | Valid | Yancey | Carboniferous | | United Kingdom; United States (Illinois) | A pinnid bivalve. The type species is "Pinna" spatula McCoy (1853); genus also includes "Pinna" subspatulata Worthen (1875). | |
| Legumen kaririense | Sp. nov | | Guerrini et al. | Early Cretaceous | Romualdo Formation | Brazil | | |
| Leptopecten daideleus | Comb. nov | Valid | (Maury) | Miocene (Burdigalian) | Pirabas Formation | Brazil | A scallop; moved from Pecten daideleus Maury (1925). | |
| Magharitrigonia | Gen. et sp. et comb. nov | Valid | Ayoub-Hannaa et al. | Early and Middle Jurassic (Hettangian-Bathonian) | Rajabiah Formation | Egypt; France; India; Japan | A member of the family Trigoniidae. The type species is M. asymmetrica; genus also includes M. senex (Kobayashi & Mori, 1954), M. brevicostata (Kitchin, 1903) and M. cristagalli (Bigot, 1893). | |
| Meekopinna permiana | Sp. nov | Valid | Yancey | Permian | | United States (Colorado; Texas) | A pinnid bivalve. | |
| Modiolus friesenbichlerae | Sp. nov | | Dominici, Danise & Tintori | Middle Triassic (Ladinian) | Pelsa-Vazzoler Lagerstätte | Italy | A species of Modiolus. | |
| Myoconcha busattae | Sp. nov | | Dominici, Danise & Tintori | Middle Triassic (Ladinian) | Pelsa-Vazzoler Lagerstätte | Italy | A member of the family Kalenteridae. | |
| Neustriella | Gen. et comb. nov | Valid | Cooper | Jurassic | | France | A member of Trigoniida belonging to the family Vaugoniidae. The type species is "Trigonia" moutierensis Lycett (1872). | |
| Nipponitrigonia yebisu | Sp. nov | Valid | Yoshinaga, Hirose & Maeda | Cretaceous | Goshoura Group | Japan | A member of the family Trigoniidae. | |
| Niranohamella | Gen. et comb. nov | Valid | Cooper | Jurassic | | Japan; United States | A member of Trigoniida belonging to the family Vaugoniidae. The type species is "Orthotrigonia" midareta Kobayashi & Mori (1955); genus also includes "Orthotrigonia" corrugata Kobayashi & Mori (1955), "Orthotrigonia" sohli Poulton (1979) and "Scaphotrigonia" somensi Kobayashi & Tamura (1957). | |
| Orthopinna | Gen. et 2 sp. et comb. nov | Valid | Yancey | Carboniferous and Permian | | United States (Arizona; Kansas; Nevada; Oklahoma) | A pinnid bivalve. The type species is O. boonensis; genus also includes new species O. modesta, as well as "Pinna" consimilis Walcott (1884), "Pinna" lata Beede (1902) and "Aviculopinna" sagitta Chronic (1952). | |
| Oxyeurax mickletonensis | Sp. nov | Valid | Knight, Collins & Morris | Early Jurassic | | United Kingdom | A member of the family Astartidae. | |
| Oxyeurax thompsoni | Sp. nov | Valid | Knight, Collins & Morris | Early Jurassic | | United Kingdom | A member of the family Astartidae. | |
| Parallelodon pauli | Sp. nov | Valid | Friedel & Amler | Devonian (Famennian) | Etroeungt Formation | Germany; United Kingdom | A member of the family Parallelodontidae. | |
| Paracyclas initium | Sp. nov | | Wang et al. | Ordovician | Hsiangyang Formation | China | | |
| Parorthotrigonia | Gen. et comb. nov | Valid | Ayoub-Hannaa et al. | Jurassic | | China; Egypt | A member of Trigoniida belonging to the family Myophorellidae. The type species is "Trigonia (Awadia)" lepidomorpha Abdallah & Fahmy (1969). | |
| Pelsia | Gen. et comb. nov | | Dominici, Danise & Tintori | Triassic | | Italy | A member of the family Pteriidae. Genus includes "Pteria" margaritata Corazzari & Lucchi-Garavello (1980). | |
| Perapecten tetristriatus | Comb. nov | Valid | (Ferreria) | Miocene (Burdigalian) | Pirabas Formation | Brazil | A scallop; moved from Chlamys (Argopecten) tetristriata Ferreria (1960). | |
| Protocardia vindovera | Nom. nov | Valid | Pacaud in Coan, Pacaud & Kabat | Early Cretaceous (Hauterivian) | | France | A replacement name for Cardium impressum Leymerie (1842). | |
| Retetrigonia | Gen. et comb. nov | Valid | Ayoub-Hannaa et al. | Middle to Late Jurassic (Bathonian-Kimmeridgian) | | Egypt; France; United Kingdom | A member of Trigoniida belonging to the family Myophorellidae. The type species is "Trigonia" imbricata Sowerby (1826); genus also includes R. parcinoda (Lycett, 1872). | |
| Rhomboconcha | Gen. et sp. nov | | Wang et al. | Ordovician | Hsiangyang Formation | China | Genus includes new species R. tresdentes. | |
| Shahpuranaia | Gen. et sp. nov | Valid | Delvene et al. | Paleocene (Danian) | | India | A member of Unionida belonging to the tribe Indochinellini. Genus includes new species S. shai. | |
| Tapes (Callistotapes) valgerardensis | Nom. nov | Valid | Pacaud in Coan, Pacaud & Kabat | Eocene | | France | A member of the family Veneridae; a replacement name for Venus tenuis Deshayes (1825). | |
| Tauricagonia | Gen. et comb. nov | Valid | Cooper | Early Cretaceous (Berriasian) | | Crimea | A member of Trigoniida belonging to the family Vaugoniidae. The type species is "Orthotrigonia" mordvilkoae Yanin (1979). | |
| Thyasira histriaensis | Sp. nov | | Hryniewicz et al. | Eocene | | Croatia | A species of Thyasira. | |
| Transkeia sagaensis | Sp. nov | Valid | Matsubara | Eocene-Oligocene | Kishima Formation | Japan | A member of the family Ungulinidae. | |
| Voluceropecten | Gen. et comb. nov | Valid | Biakov | Permian | | Russia | A member of Pectinida, the type genus of the new family Voluceropectinidae; a new genus for "Aviculopecten" volucer Lutkevich & Lobanova. | |
| Waipahigonia | Gen. et comb. nov | | Cooper | Middle and Late Jurassic | | Antarctica; New Zealand | A member of Trigoniida belonging to the family Vaugoniidae. Genus includes "Vaugonia (Orthotrigonia)" quiltyi Kelly (1995) and "Orthotrigonia" waipahiensis Fleming (1987) | |
| Yunfuconcha | Gen. et sp. nov | Valid | Zhang, Johnston & Niu in Zhang et al. | Ordovician | Dongchong Formation | China | A possibly member of the stem group of Archiheterodonta. The type species is Y. bimenta. | |

=== Bivalve research ===
- Evidence indicative of different dynamics of the rates of origination and net diversification in infaunal and epifaunal bivalves throughout the Phanerozoic is presented by Foote, Edie & Jablonski (2024).
- A study on the anatomy and affinities of Shaninopsis Johnston, Collom & Ebbestad (2024).
- Isozaki (2024) reports the first discovery of alatoconchid fossil material from the Capitanian strata from the Iwaizaki limestone (South Kitakami belt; Japan) and from the Chandalaz Formation (Sergeevka belt; Primorye, Russia).
- Evidence indicating that, in spite of significant decrease in taxonomic diversity, the functional diversity of bivalves of only slightly affected by the Permian–Triassic extinction event is presented by Wang et al. (2024).
- A study on the recovery of bivalves in the aftermath of the Permian–Triassic extinction event, providing evidence of an increase in endemicity beginning in the Middle Triassic, is published by Echevarría & Ros-Franch (2024).
- Moneer et al. (2024) revise Campanian Tethyan oysters from the North Eastern Desert of Egypt, who interpret the studied fossils as indicative of the primary migration pattern of oysters from the Southern Tethys margin towards the East–West direction, as well as indicative of a transition towards deeper environments during the middle-late Campanian.
- Saha et al. (2024) describe fossil material of Seebachia bronni from the Tithonian Jhuran Formation, representing the first record of the species from India and its oldest record globally reported to date.
- Pérez & Berezovsky (2024) study the phylogenetic affinities of Malarossia from the Eocene of Ukraine, recovering it as an early diverging genus within the carditid subfamily Scalaricarditinae.
- Evidence from oxygen stable isotope analysis of bivalve shells from the Coralline Crag Formation (United Kingdom), interpreted as likely indicative of glacial/interglacial type climate fluctuations during the early Pliocene resulting in the presence of species adapted to warmer conditions and to colder ones in the studied shell beds, is presented by Cudennec et al. (2024).
- A study on the evolutionary history of Mediterranean bivalves across the Zanclean-Calabrian interval, providing evidence of less intense and more gradual loss of biodiversity than previously estimated and of more severe loss of biodiversity suspension feeders compared to infaunal deposit feeders, is published by Mondanaro, Dominici & Danise (2024).
- Campbell (2024) revises the bivalve fossil record from the Pleistocene Waccamaw Formation (United States), expanding known bivalve diversity from this formation.

== Gastropods ==
| Name | Novelty | Status | Authors | Age | Type locality | Location | Notes | Images |
|---|---|---|---|---|---|---|---|---|
| Acanthais? sutii | Sp. nov | Valid | Kovács & Vicián | Miocene | Lajta Limestone Formation | Hungary | Possibly a species of Acanthais. | |
| Agordozyga | Gen. et sp. nov | | Dominici, Danise & Tintori | Middle Triassic (Ladinian) | Pelsa-Vazzoler Lagerstätte | Italy | A member of the family Pseudozygopleuridae. Genus includes new species A. caprina. | |
| Allopeas agnolini | Sp. nov | Valid | Miquel | Late Cretaceous (Maastrichtian) | Chorrillo Formation | Argentina | A species of Allopeas. | |
| Amalda bibhae | Sp. nov | Valid | Banerjee & Halder | Eocene | Cambay Shale | India | A species of Amalda. | |
| Amaurellina cambayensis | Sp. nov | Valid | Banerjee & Halder | Eocene | Cambay Shale | India | | |
| Ampullina? eocenica | Sp. nov | Valid | Banerjee & Halder | Eocene | Cambay Shale | India | | |
| Ampullina vastanensis | Sp. nov | Valid | Banerjee & Halder | Eocene | Cambay Shale | India | | |
| Angularia kittli | Sp. nov | Valid | Bakayeva, Nützel & Kaim | Late Triassic (Carnian) | San Cassiano Formation | Italy | A member of the family Purpurinidae. | |
| Aphanoptyxis sinerugae | Sp. nov | Valid | Gründel & Nützel | Late Jurassic (Kimmeridgian) | | Germany | A member of Nerineoidea. | |
| Apiocypraea globovula | Sp. nov | Valid | Dolin & Aguerre in Dolin, Aguerre & Vaessen | Miocene | | France | | |
| Apiocypraea improcera | Sp. nov | Valid | Dolin in Dolin, Aguerre & Vaessen | Miocene | | France | | |
| Apiocypraea navicula | Sp. nov | Valid | Dolin in Dolin, Aguerre & Vaessen | Miocene | | France | | |
| Apiocypraea orbiculata | Sp. nov | Valid | Dolin in Dolin, Aguerre & Vaessen | Miocene | | France | | |
| Apiocypraea planulosa | Sp. nov | Valid | Dolin & Vaessen in Dolin, Aguerre & Vaessen | Miocene | | Netherlands | | |
| Apiocypraea quantula | Sp. nov | Valid | Dolin in Dolin, Aguerre & Vaessen | Miocene | | France | | |
| Apiocypraea vesicula | Sp. nov | Valid | Dolin in Dolin, Aguerre & Vaessen | Miocene | | France | | |
| Apiotoma rammohani | Sp. nov | Valid | Banerjee & Halder | Eocene | Cambay Shale | India | A species of Apiotoma. | |
| Aplus anatolicus | Sp. nov | Valid | Harzhauser & Landau | Miocene | Týrtar Formation | Turkey | A species of Aplus. | |
| Aplus hofae | Sp. nov | Valid | Harzhauser & Landau | Miocene | Dej Formation | Romania | A species of Aplus. | |
| Aplus raveni | Sp. nov | Valid | Landau & Harzhauser | Pliocene | | Spain | A species of Aplus. | |
| Aporrhais siberica | Sp. nov | Valid | Wieneke & Trubin in Wieneke et al. | Eocene | Tavda Formation | Russia | A species of Aporrhais. | |
| Aptyxiella tricincta | Comb. nov | Valid | (Münster) | Late Jurassic (Kimmeridgian) | | Germany | A member of Nerineoidea; moved from Nerinea tricincta Münster sensu Quenstedt (1881–1884). | |
| Aristovasum chipolense | Comb. nov | Valid | (Vokes) | Miocene | Chipola Formation | United States (Florida) | A member of the family Vasidae. Moved from Vasum chipolense Vokes (1966). | |
| Assouella | Nom. nov | Valid | Pacaud | Cretaceous | | India; Iran | A replacement name for Morgania Cossmann (1906; itself a replacement name for Irania Douvillé, 1904). The type species is "Vicarya" fusiformis Hislop (1860). | |
| Attiliosa juhaszi | Sp. nov | Valid | Kovács & Vicián | Miocene | Lajta Limestone Formation | Hungary | A species of Attiliosa. | |
| Atys extumidus | Nom. nov | Valid | Pacaud in Coan, Pacaud & Kabat | Oligocene | | France; Germany | A species of Atys; a replacement name for Bulla turgidula Sandberger (1859). | |
| Babelomurex brugnonei | Sp. nov | Disputed | Appolloni & Smriglio | Pliocene | | Italy | A species of Babelomurex. Considered to be a junior synonym of Babelomurex janianus by Forli, Cresti & Pagli (2026). | |
| Barycypraea macropyga | Sp. nov | Valid | Lorenz | Pliocene | | Indonesia | A species of Barycypraea. | |
| Benthonella prosoclinata | Sp. nov | Valid | Banerjee & Halder | Eocene | Cambay Shale | India | A species of Benthonella. | |
| Bernaya molisana | Sp. nov | Valid | Capasso | Late Cretaceous | | Italy | A species of Bernaya. | |
| Beyregrex | Gen. et comb. nov | Valid | Merle in Merle et al. | Paleogene | | Belgium; France; Germany; United Kingdom | A member of the family Muricidae. The type species is "Murex" pereger Beyrich (1854); genus also includes "Murex" sarroniensis Carez (1879), "Murex" hantoniensis Edwards in Lowry et al. (1866), "Hexaplex" brevaculeatus Janssen (1978) and "Murex (Poirieria)" cedillatus Cossmann & Peyrot (1924). | |
| Bezanconia invenusta | Sp. nov | Valid | Pacaud | Eocene | | France | A member of the family Cerithiidae. | |
| Biarmeaspira heidelbergerae | Sp. nov | Valid | Karapunar, Todd & Nützel | Carboniferous (Viséan) | Lower Limestone Formation | United Kingdom | A member of the family Eotomariidae. | |
| Bistolida barbieriae | Sp. nov | Valid | Dovesi | Miocene | | Indonesia | A species of Bistolida. | |
| Bittium kamalae | Sp. nov | Valid | Banerjee & Halder | Eocene | Cambay Shale | India | A species of Bittium. | |
| Bittium purnimae | Sp. nov | Valid | Banerjee & Halder | Eocene | Cambay Shale | India | A species of Bittium. | |
| Bocourtia leonardodavincii | Sp. nov | Valid | Miquel | Late Cretaceous (Maastrichtian) | Chorrillo Formation | Argentina | A species of Bocourtia. | |
| Bothriembryon pilkiensis | Sp. nov | Valid | Ryan et al. | Possibly late Pliocene | | Australia | A species of Bothriembryon. | |
| Bradneria michaulti | Sp. nov | Valid | Dolin in Dolin, Aguerre & Vaessen | Miocene | | France | A member of the family Cypraeidae. | |
| Calagrassor viciani | Sp. nov | Valid | Harzhauser & Landau | Miocene | Baden Formation | Austria; Czech Republic; Hungary; Romania | A species of Calagrassor. | |
| Camponaxis ladinica | Sp. nov | | Dominici, Danise & Tintori | Middle Triassic (Ladinian) | Pelsa-Vazzoler Lagerstätte | Italy | A member of the family Cimidae. | |
| Canaridiscus dollyae | Sp. nov | Valid | Margry | | | Spain (Canary Islands) | A species of Canaridiscus. | |
| Cancellotomaria boninsegnai | Sp. nov | Valid | Monari & Dellantonio | Middle Triassic (Anisian) | | Italy | A member of Pleurotomariida belonging to the family Zygitidae. | |
| Cassis vancuycki | Sp. nov | Valid | Lozouet & Lesport | Oligocene | | France | A species of Cassis. | |
| Cerithiopsis vilsundensis | Sp. nov | Valid | Schnetler et al. | Oligocene | | Denmark | A species of Cerithiopsis. | |
| Clathrospira gondwanica | Sp. nov | Valid | Ferrari, Bertero & Carrera | Ordovician (Sandbian–Hirnantian) | | Argentina | A member of the family Eotomariidae. | |
| Clithon cliffendense | Sp. nov | Valid | Symonds | Paleogene | Headon Hill Formation | United Kingdom | A species of Clithon. | |
| Clithon greteliae | Sp. nov | Valid | Symonds | Paleogene | Bouldnor Formation | United Kingdom | A species of Clithon. | |
| Clithon pacaudi | Sp. nov | Valid | Symonds | Paleogene | Bouldnor Formation | United Kingdom | A species of Clithon. | |
| Codinella? fontanai | Sp. nov | Valid | Monari & Dellantonio | Middle Triassic (Anisian) | | Italy | A member of Pleurotomariida belonging to the superfamily Pleurotomarioidea and the family Stuorellidae. | |
| Coelostemma patagonica | Sp. nov | Valid | Miquel | Late Cretaceous (Maastrichtian) | Chorrillo Formation | Argentina | A member of the family Holospiridae. | |
| Coelostylina civettae | Sp. nov | | Dominici, Danise & Tintori | Middle Triassic (Ladinian) | Pelsa-Vazzoler Lagerstätte | Italy | A member of the family Coelostylinidae. | |
| Colina deshayesi | Nom. nov | Valid | Pacaud in Coan, Pacaud & Kabat | Eocene | | France | A species of Colina; a replacement name for Cerithium perelegans trilirata Deshayes (1864). | |
| Colubraria alboranensis | Sp. nov | Valid | Landau & Harzhauser | Pliocene | | Spain | A species of Colubraria. | |
| Conus tsampikaensis | Sp. nov | Valid | Psarras et al. | Pleistocene | Ladiko-Tsampika Formation | Greece | A species of Conus. | |
| Conus ventricosus rhodesensis | Sp. nov | Valid | Psarras et al. | Pleistocene | Ladiko-Tsampika Formation | Greece | A subspecies of Conus ventricosus. | |
| Coralliophila subscarrosa | Sp. nov | Valid | Kovács & Vicián | Miocene | Lajta Limestone Formation | Hungary | A species of Coralliophila. | |
| Corrosella arlanzonica | Sp. nov | Valid | Talaván-Serna & Talaván-Gómez | Miocene | | Spain | Probably a species of Corrosella. | |
| Cortinella stricta | Sp. nov | | Dominici, Danise & Tintori | Middle Triassic (Ladinian) | Pelsa-Vazzoler Lagerstätte | Italy | A member of the family Cortinellidae. | |
| Crassimurex (Pliocrassimurex) hirtus | Sp. nov | Valid | Merle et al. | Pliocene | | Spain | A member of the family Muricidae. | |
| Creniturbo gibbosus | Sp. nov | Valid | Gründel & Nützel | Late Jurassic (Kimmeridgian) | | Germany | A member of Vetigastropoda of uncertain affinities. | |
| Cribrarula bumamma | Sp. nov | Valid | Dolin in Dolin, Aguerre & Vaessen | Miocene | | France | A species of Cribrarula. | |
| Crossostoma acuta | Sp. nov | Valid | Ferrari | Early Jurassic (Pliensbachian) | | Argentina | A member of the family Colloniidae. | |
| Crossostoma? extensa | Sp. nov | Valid | Ferrari | Early Jurassic (Pliensbachian) | | Argentina | A member of the family Colloniidae. | |
| Cryptaulax pelsae | Sp. nov | | Dominici, Danise & Tintori | Middle Triassic (Ladinian) | Pelsa-Vazzoler Lagerstätte | Italy | A member of the family Cryptaulacidae. | |
| Cryptoneolatirus | Gen. et comb. nov | Valid | Harzhauser, Landau & Vermeij | Miocene | | Austria; Romania | A member of the family Fasciolariidae. The type species is "Fasciolaria" bellardii Hörnes (1854). | |
| Cryptoptyxis ? spinosus | Sp. nov | Valid | Gründel & Nützel | Late Jurassic (Kimmeridgian) | | Germany | A member of the family Maoraxidae. | |
| Cuspivolva hawkei | Sp. nov | Valid | Celzard | Miocene | | Australia | A member of the family Ovulidae, tentatively assigned to the genus Cuspivolva. | |
| Cyclophorus kubarensis | Sp. nov | Valid | Hirano & Matsuoka | Miocene | Korematsu Formation | Japan | A species of Cyclophorus. | |
| Cypraea hebes | Sp. nov | Valid | Dolin in Dolin, Aguerre & Vaessen | Miocene | | France | A species of Cypraea. | |
| Cypraea ortyx | Sp. nov | Valid | Dolin in Dolin, Aguerre & Vaessen | Miocene | | France | A species of Cypraea. | |
| Cypraea palma | Sp. nov | Valid | Dolin in Dolin, Aguerre & Vaessen | Miocene | | France | A species of Cypraea. | |
| Cypraea parazoila | Sp. nov | Valid | Lorenz | Pliocene | | Indonesia | A species of Cypraea. | |
| Cypraea tholus | Sp. nov | Valid | Dolin in Dolin, Aguerre & Vaessen | Miocene | | France | A species of Cypraea. | |
| Cypraea valens | Sp. nov | Valid | Dolin in Dolin, Aguerre & Vaessen | Miocene | | France | A species of Cypraea. | |
| Cypraedia mariehelenae | Sp. nov | Valid | Celzard | Eocene | | France | | |
| Dermomurex ligerianus | Sp. nov | Valid | Merle et al. | Miocene | | France | A species of Dermomurex. | |
| Diarthema aspera | Sp. nov | Valid | Gründel & Nützel | Late Jurassic (Kimmeridgian) | | Germany | A member of the family Aporrhaidae. | |
| Diatrypesis agordina | Sp. nov | | Dominici, Danise & Tintori | Middle Triassic (Ladinian) | Pelsa-Vazzoler Lagerstätte | Italy | A member of the family Zygopleuridae. | |
| Dimorphotomaria | Gen. et sp. et comb. nov | Valid | Monari & Dellantonio | Middle Triassic (Anisian) | | Italy; Romania | A member of Pleurotomariida belonging to the superfamily Pleurotomarioidea and possibly to the family Wortheniellidae. The type species is D. fassaensis; genus also includes "Worthenia (Humiliworthenia)" microstriata Nützel et al. (2018). | |
| Discopsis destefanii | Sp. nov | Valid | Reitano, Di Franco & Scuderi | Pliocene | | Italy | A species of Discopsis. | |
| Discopsis philippii | Sp. nov | Valid | Reitano, Di Franco & Scuderi | Pleistocene | | Italy | A species of Discopsis. | |
| Discopsis vivianorum | Sp. nov | Valid | Reitano, Di Franco & Scuderi | Pliocene | | Italy | A species of Discopsis. | |
| Dissona inusitata | Sp. nov | Valid | Celzard & Dovesi | Miocene | | Indonesia | A species of Dissona. | |
| Dolicholatirus alboranensis | Sp. nov | Valid | Landau & Harzhauser | Pliocene | | Spain | A species of Dolicholatirus. | |
| Dulaiania | Gen. et comb. nov | Valid | Harzhauser, Landau & Vermeij | Miocene | | Romania | A member of the family Dolicholatiridae. The type species is "Fasciolaria" pleurotomoides Hoernes & Auinger (1890). | |
| Ebenomitra ellenae | Sp. nov | Valid | Landau & Harzhauser | Pliocene | | Spain | A member of the family Costellariidae. | |
| Eesticonus | Gen. et sp. nov | | Peel | Ordovician (Darriwilian) | | Estonia | A probable member of Archinacelloidea. The type species is E. aariensis. | |
| Eopreangeria | Gen. et sp. nov | Valid | Banerjee & Halder | Eocene | Cambay Shale | India | Genus includes new species E. mangrolensis. | |
| Eotrivia alorg | Sp. nov | Valid | Zamberlan & Checchi | Eocene (Lutetian) | | Italy | A member of the family Ovulidae. | |
| Episcomitra gonnieae | Sp. nov | Valid | Landau & Harzhauser | Pliocene | | Spain | A species of Episcomitra. | |
| Episcomitra pliotenuis | Nom. nov | Valid | Landau & Harzhauser | Pliocene | | Italy | A species of Episcomitra; a replacement name for Mitra tenuis Bellardi (1887). | |
| Erato falsemarginella | Sp. nov | Valid | Fehse et al. | Pliocene | | Italy | A species of Erato. | |
| Erato immanis | Sp. nov | Valid | Fehse et al. | Pliocene | | Greece | A species of Erato. | |
| Euconactaeon volkheimeri | Sp. nov | Valid | Ferrari | Middle Jurassic (Aalenian–Bajocian) | | Argentina | A member of Acteonoidea belonging to the family Cylindrobullinidae. | |
| Eucycloscala nitida | Sp. nov | | Dominici, Danise & Tintori | Middle Triassic (Ladinian) | Pelsa-Vazzoler Lagerstätte | Italy | | |
| Eucyclus novus | Sp. nov | Valid | Ferrari | Early Jurassic (Toarcian) | | Argentina | A member of the family Eucyclidae. | |
| Eulimella (Anisocycla) acucula | Nom. nov | Valid | Pacaud in Coan, Pacaud & Kabat | Eocene | | France | A species of Eulimella; a replacement name for Aciculina gracilis Deshayes (1861). | |
| Eurolatirus | Gen. et comb. nov | Valid | Harzhauser, Landau & Vermeij | Miocene | | Austria; Bosnia and Herzegovina; Bulgaria; Czech Republic; France; Hungary; Italy; Poland; Romania; Turkey | A member of the family Fasciolariidae. The type species is "Fasciolaria" ornata d'Orbigny (1852); genus also includes "Streptochetus" dispar Peyrot (1928) and "Fusus" zahlbruckneri Quenstedt (1884; possibly a synonym of E. ornatus). | |
| Eustoma ? gracilis | Sp. nov | Valid | Gründel & Nützel | Late Jurassic (Kimmeridgian) | | Germany | A member of the family Eustomatidae. | |
| Euthria brunettii | Sp. nov | Valid | Harzhauser & Landau | Miocene | Baden Formation | Austria; Bulgaria; Czech Republic; Poland; Romania | A species of Euthria. | |
| Euthria dellabellai | Sp. nov | Valid | Harzhauser & Landau | Miocene | Grund Formation | Austria; Czech Republic | A species of Euthria. | |
| Euthria frausseni | Sp. nov | Valid | Harzhauser & Landau | Miocene | Dej Formation | Austria; Hungary; Romania | A species of Euthria. | |
| Euthria iberoadunca | Sp. nov | Valid | Landau & Harzhauser | Pliocene | | Spain | A species of Euthria. | |
| Euthria inflatissima | Sp. nov | Valid | Landau & Harzhauser | Pliocene | | Spain | A species of Euthria. | |
| Euthria lucenica | Sp. nov | Valid | Landau & Harzhauser | Pliocene | | Spain | A species of Euthria. | |
| Euthria obelixi | Sp. nov | Valid | Harzhauser & Landau | Miocene | Brno Sand Formation | Czech Republic | A species of Euthria. | |
| Euthria odiosa | Sp. nov | Valid | Harzhauser & Landau | Miocene | Baden Formation | Austria; Bulgaria; Czech Republic; Hungary; Poland; Romania; Slovenia | A species of Euthria. | |
| Euthria onubensis | Sp. nov | Valid | Landau & Harzhauser | Pliocene | | Spain | A species of Euthria. | |
| Euthria pliovirginea | Sp. nov | Valid | Landau & Harzhauser | Pliocene | | Spain | A species of Euthria. | |
| Euthria pouweri | Sp. nov | Valid | Landau & Harzhauser | Pliocene | | Spain | A species of Euthria. | |
| Euthria walaszczyki | Sp. nov | Valid | Harzhauser & Landau | Miocene | Grund Formation | Austria | A species of Euthria. | |
| Euthria yesimae | Sp. nov | Valid | Harzhauser & Landau | Miocene | Týrtar Formation | Turkey | A species of Euthria. | |
| Euthria zachosi | Sp. nov | Valid | Harzhauser & Landau | Miocene | Baden Formation | Austria | A species of Euthria. | |
| Euthystylus dincae | Sp. nov | | Dominici, Danise & Tintori | Middle Triassic (Ladinian) | Pelsa-Vazzoler Lagerstätte | Italy | A member of Pseudozygopleuroidea belonging to the family Goniospiridae. | |
| Favartia jansseni | Sp. nov | Valid | Merle et al. | Miocene | | Netherlands | A species of Favartia. | |
| Fiacconella | Gen. et comb. et sp. nov | Valid | Monari & Dellantonio | Middle Triassic | | Austria; Italy | A member of Pleurotomariida belonging to the superfamily Pleurotomarioidea and the family Stuorellidae. The type species is "Pleurotomaria" leda Kittl (1895); genus also includes "Pleurotomaria" mammiformis Kittl (1895) and "Perotrochus" vasculum Böhm (1895), as well as new species F. pericincta. | |
| Fiemmespira | Gen. et comb. nov | Valid | Monari & Dellantonio | Middle Triassic (Anisian) | | China; Italy; Germany? | A member of Pleurotomariida belonging to the superfamily Pleurotomarioidea and the family Wortheniellidae. The type species is "Worthenia" marmolatae Kittl (1895); genus also includes "Worthenia" esinensis Kittl (1899), "Worthenia" zardini Yin & Yochelson (1983) and possibly "Worthenia" goederti Eckert (1955). | |
| Flexopteron constantinense | Sp. nov | Valid | Merle et al. | Eocene | Argiles à Corbules Formation | France | A species of Flexopteron. | |
| Flexopteron liancurtense | Sp. nov | Valid | Merle et al. | Eocene | | France | A species of Flexopteron. | |
| Fraudifusinus | Gen. et comb. et 2 sp. nov | Valid | Harzhauser, Landau & Vermeij | Miocene | | Austria; Bulgaria; Czech Republic; Hungary; Romania | A member of the family Fasciolariidae. The type species is "Fusus" crispoides Kittl (1887); genus also includes new species F. grundensis and F. pseudocrispoides. | |
| Gaetania | Gen. et sp. nov | | Dominici, Danise & Tintori | Middle Triassic (Ladinian) | Pelsa-Vazzoler Lagerstätte | Italy | A member of the family Coelostylinidae. Genus includes new species G. coronata. | |
| Gailleagrassor | Gen. et sp. nov | Valid | Harzhauser & Landau | Miocene | Dej Formation | Austria; Czech Republic; Hungary; Romania | A member of the family Eosiphonidae. The type species is G. paratethyca. | |
| Galeropsis badenica | Sp. nov | Valid | Kovács & Vicián | Miocene | Lajta Limestone Formation | Hungary | A member of the family Muricidae. | |
| Gomerella | Gen. et sp. nov | Valid | Margry | | | Spain (Canary Islands) | A probable member of the family Pristilomatidae. The type species is G. parvisulcata. | |
| Gourmya magnifica | Sp. nov | Valid | Landau, Breitenberger & Harzhauser | Miocene | | Indonesia | A species of Gourmya. | |
| Gracilipurpura? evae | Sp. nov | Valid | Kovács & Vicián | Miocene | Lajta Limestone Formation | Hungary | Possibly a species of Gracilipurpura. | |
| Gyrineum cahuzaci | Sp. nov | Valid | Lozouet & Lesport | Oligocene | | France | A species of Gyrineum. | |
| Hayamiella subvaricosa | Comb. nov | Valid | (Brösamlen) | Late Jurassic (Kimmeridgian) | | Germany | A member of the family Neritopsidae; moved from Neritopsis subvaricosa Brösamlen (1909). | |
| Heliacus stefanmeszarosi | Sp. nov | Valid | Biskupič | Miocene (Serravallian) | Stupava Formation | Slovakia | A species of Heliacus. | |
| Hemiauricula marolium | Nom. nov | Valid | Pacaud in Coan, Pacaud & Kabat | Early Cretaceous (Hauterivian) | | France | A member of the family Acteonidae; a replacement name for Auricula marginata Leymerie (1842). | |
| Hemiconus acionna | Nom. nov | Valid | Pacaud in Coan, Pacaud & Kabat | Oligocene | | France; Germany | A replacement name for Conus symmetricus Sandberger (1859). | |
| Hiraseadusta dubitata | Sp. nov | Valid | Dolin in Dolin, Aguerre & Vaessen | Miocene | | France | A member of the family Cypraeidae. | |
| Hiraseadusta epitrita | Sp. nov | Valid | Dolin in Dolin, Aguerre & Vaessen | Miocene | | France | A member of the family Cypraeidae. | |
| Hiraseadusta fidicularia | Sp. nov | Valid | Dolin in Dolin, Aguerre & Vaessen | Miocene | | France | A member of the family Cypraeidae. | |
| Hiraseadusta harzhauseri | Sp. nov | Valid | Dolin & Vaessen in Dolin, Aguerre & Vaessen | Miocene | | Romania | A member of the family Cypraeidae. | |
| Hiraseadusta laureola | Sp. nov | Valid | Dolin in Dolin, Aguerre & Vaessen | Miocene | | France | A member of the family Cypraeidae. | |
| Hiraseadusta nucleola | Sp. nov | Valid | Dolin in Dolin, Aguerre & Vaessen | Miocene | | France | A member of the family Cypraeidae. | |
| Hiraseadusta quiriforma | Sp. nov | Valid | Dolin in Dolin, Aguerre & Vaessen | Miocene | | France | A member of the family Cypraeidae. | |
| Hiraseadusta repandirostra | Sp. nov | Valid | Dolin in Dolin, Aguerre & Vaessen | Miocene | | France | A member of the family Cypraeidae. | |
| Hiraseadusta tornatilis | Sp. nov | Valid | Dolin in Dolin, Aguerre & Vaessen | Miocene | | France | A member of the family Cypraeidae. | |
| Hiraseadusta uberata | Sp. nov | Valid | Dolin in Dolin, Aguerre & Vaessen | Miocene | | France | A member of the family Cypraeidae. | |
| Indobatillaria | Gen. et sp. nov | Valid | Banerjee & Halder | Eocene | Cambay Shale | India | Genus includes new species I. ismatae. | |
| Indolithes | Gen. et sp. nov | Valid | Dharma | Miocene | | Indonesia | A member of the family Fasciolariidae. The type species is I. elvinae. | |
| Involuta? ishwari | Sp. nov | Valid | Banerjee & Halder | Eocene | Cambay Shale | India | | |
| Islamia arcana | Sp. nov | Valid | Miller | Neogene (Messinian to Villafranchian) | | Spain | A species of Islamia. | |
| Janiopsis vindobonensis | Sp. nov | Valid | Harzhauser & Landau | Miocene | Baden Formation | Austria; Bosnia and Herzegovina; Bulgaria; Hungary; Romania | A member of the family Pisaniidae. | |
| Javastrombus | Gen. et 6 sp. nov | Valid | Altaba | Miocene | | Indonesia | A member of the family Strombidae. The type species is J. praegracilis; genus also includes J. pinguis, J. cylindratus, J. kecil, J. subinermis and J. sondaicus. Dekkers & Ćorić (2025) considered J. praegracilis to be the sole species of this genus, interpreting other species as junior synonyms of the type species. | |
| Juventigulella saidii | Sp. nov | Valid | Rowson et al. | Pleistocene | | Kenya | A species of Juventigulella. | |
| Kanamarua ducoi | Sp. nov | Valid | Landau & Harzhauser | Pliocene | | Spain | A species of Kanamarua. | |
| Kayella | Gen. et comb. et 7 sp. nov | Junior homonym | Dolin in Dolin, Aguerre & Vaessen | Miocene | | France; Italy | A member of the family Cypraeidae. The type species is "Cypraea" porcellus Brocchi (1814); genus also includes new species K. groeneveldi Dolin & Vaessen, K. inaequata Dolin, K. lecointrae Dolin, K. memeteaui Dolin, K. richardae Dolin, K. triquetra Dolin and K. vernati Dolin. The generic name is preoccupied by Kayella Vecammen-Grandjean 1960; Dolin (2025) coined a replacement name Porcellusia. | |
| Kelheimia | Gen. et sp. nov | Valid | Gründel & Nützel | Late Jurassic (Kimmeridgian) | | Germany | A member of Vetigastropoda of uncertain affinities. The type species is K. triangulata. | |
| Laevitomaria australis | Sp. nov | Valid | Ferrari | Early Jurassic (Pliensbachian) | | Argentina | A member of the family Pleurotomariidae. | |
| Laevitomaria? gigas | Sp. nov | Valid | Ferrari | Early Jurassic (Pliensbachian) | | Argentina | A member of the family Pleurotomariidae. | |
| Lambis elviae | Sp. nov | Valid | Dharma & Liverani | Miocene | | Indonesia | A species of Lambis. | |
| Lambis wakefieldi | Sp. nov | Valid | Dharma & Liverani | Miocene | | Indonesia | A species of Lambis. | |
| Lilloiconcha novasi | Sp. nov | Valid | Miquel | Late Cretaceous (Maastrichtian) | Chorrillo Formation | Argentina | A member of the family Charopidae. | |
| Linatella antecessor | Sp. nov | Valid | Lozouet & Lesport | Oligocene | | France | A species of Linatella. | |
| Liralithes | Gen. et comb. nov | Valid | Vermeij, Raven & Harzhauser | Miocene to Pleistocene | | Indonesia; Philippines | A member of the family Clavilithidae. The type species is "Fusus" tjidamarensis Martin (1879); genus also includes "Fusus (Clavella)" tjaringinensis Martin (1895) and "Fusus (Clavella)" verbeeki Martin (1895). | |
| Lysinoe bravoensis | Sp. nov | Valid | Salvador | Oligocene | | Mexico | A member of the family Xanthonychidae. | |
| Macrozonites turonia | Nom. nov | Valid | Pacaud in Coan, Pacaud & Kabat | Miocene | | France | A member of the family Grandipatulidae; a replacement name for Helix umbilicalis Deshayes (1832). | |
| Metula aliceae | Sp. nov | Valid | Harzhauser & Landau | Miocene | Dej Formation | Austria; Hungary; Romania | A species of Metula. | |
| Metula kovacsi | Sp. nov | Valid | Harzhauser & Landau | Miocene | Dej Formation | Romania | A species of Metula. | |
| Metula moli | Sp. nov | Valid | Landau & Harzhauser | Pliocene | | Spain | A species of Metula. | |
| Miolyncina margaritaria | Sp. nov | Valid | Dovesi & Lorenz | Pliocene (Zanclean) | Kaliwangu Formation | Indonesia | | |
| Mitromorpha danica | Sp. nov | Valid | Schnetler et al. | Oligocene | | Denmark | A species of Mitromorpha. | |
| Moenaspira | Gen. et comb. et sp. nov | Valid | Monari & Dellantonio | Middle Triassic (Anisian) | | Italy; China? Poland? | A member of Pleurotomariida belonging to the superfamily Murchisonioidea and the family Plethospiridae. The type species is "Worthenia" magna Böhm (1895); genus also includes new species M. crassa. | |
| Murexsul sztanoae | Sp. nov | Valid | Kovács & Vicián | Miocene | Dej Formation | Romania | A species of Murexsul. | |
| Muricopsis neraudeaui | Sp. nov | Valid | Merle et al. | Miocene | | France | A species of Muricopsis. | |
| Muricopsis pontileviensis | Sp. nov | Valid | Merle et al. | Miocene | | France | A species of Muricopsis. | |
| Napaeus ripkeni | Sp. nov | Valid | Margry | Probably Quaternary | | Spain (Canary Islands) | A species of Napaeus. | |
| Napaeus santanabenitezi | Sp. nov | Valid | Margry | Probably Quaternary | | Spain (Canary Islands) | A species of Napaeus. | |
| Napaeus vanooijeni | Sp. nov | Valid | Margry | Probably Quaternary | | Spain (Canary Islands) | A species of Napaeus. | |
| Napaeus zarzaliensis | Sp. nov | Valid | Margry | Probably Quaternary | | Spain (Canary Islands) | A species of Napaeus. | |
| Natica naroliensis | Sp. nov | Valid | Banerjee & Halder | Eocene | Cambay Shale | India | A species of Natica. | |
| Neilsonia seussae | Sp. nov | Valid | Karapunar, Todd & Nützel | Carboniferous (Viséan) | Lower Limestone Formation | United Kingdom | A member of the family Eotomariidae. | |
| Neosimnia brevicula | Sp. nov | Valid | Celzard & Dovesi | Miocene | | Indonesia | A member of the family Ovulidae. | |
| Neosimnia graniformis | Sp. nov | Valid | Celzard & Dovesi | Miocene | | Indonesia | A member of the family Ovulidae. | |
| Neosimnia multilineata | Sp. nov | Valid | Celzard & Dovesi | Miocene | | Indonesia | A member of the family Ovulidae. | |
| Neosimnia pseudolaevis | Sp. nov | Valid | Celzard & Dovesi | Miocene | | Indonesia | A member of the family Ovulidae. | |
| Neosimnia pulchra | Sp. nov | Valid | Celzard & Dovesi | Miocene | | Indonesia | A member of the family Ovulidae. | |
| Neritopsis ? rotundatus | Sp. nov | Valid | Gründel & Nützel | Late Jurassic (Kimmeridgian) | | Germany | A member of the family Neritopsidae. | |
| Neuburgensia angulata | Sp. nov | Valid | Gründel & Nützel | Late Jurassic (Kimmeridgian) | | Germany | A member of the superfamily Cerithioidea. | |
| Neuburgensia convexoconcava | Comb. nov | Valid | (Gründel, Keupp & Lang) | Late Jurassic (Kimmeridgian) | | Germany | A member of the superfamily Cerithioidea; moved from Gymnocerithium? convexoconcavum Gründel, Keupp & Lang (2019). | |
| Neuburgensia rara | Sp. nov | Valid | Gründel & Nützel | Late Jurassic (Kimmeridgian) | | Germany | A member of the superfamily Cerithioidea. | |
| Nipteraxis transmontanus | Sp. nov | Valid | Biskupič | Miocene (Serravallian) | Studienka Formation | Slovakia | A member of the family Architectonicidae. | |
| Nodocingulum ogilvieae | Sp. nov | Valid | Monari & Dellantonio | Middle Triassic (Anisian) | | Italy | A member of Pleurotomariida belonging to the superfamily Pleurotomarioidea and the family Wortheniellidae. | |
| Nododelphinula oblonga | Sp. nov | Valid | Gründel & Nützel | Late Jurassic (Kimmeridgian) | | Germany | A member of the family Nododelphinulidae. | |
| Nucellopsis parisiensis | Sp. nov | Valid | Merle et al. | Eocene | | France | A member of the family Muricidae. | |
| Obornella victoriae | Sp. nov | Valid | Ferrari | Early Jurassic (Pliensbachian) | | Argentina | A species of Obornella. | |
| Oonia kimmeridgiensis | Sp. nov | Valid | Gründel & Nützel | Late Jurassic (Kimmeridgian) | | Germany | A member of the family Ampullinidae. | |
| Pachycerithium | Gen. et sp. nov | Valid | Banerjee & Halder | Eocene | Cambay Shale | India | Genus includes new species P. richardi. | |
| Palaeorissoina hettangiensis | Sp. nov | Valid | Ferrari | Early Jurassic (Hettangian) | | Argentina | A member of the family Palaeorissoinidae. | |
| Paleochicoreus | Gen. et comb. nov | Valid | Merle in Merle et al. | Paleocene-Eocene | | Angola; Cameroon; France; Nigeria; United States (Texas; Washington) | A member of the family Muricidae. The type species is "Chicoreus (Phyllonotus)" initialis Vokes (1990); genus also includes "Murex" packardi Dickerson (1915), "Pterynoyus" newtoni Eames (1957), "Murex" diderrichi Vincent (1913), "Murex" bicostatus Deshayes (1835). | |
| Paleophasianella | Gen. et 2 sp. et comb. nov | Valid | Chaix & Plicot | Late Cretaceous | | Austria; France | A member of Trochoidea, the type genus of the new family Paleophasianellidae. The type species is P. auvrayi; genus also includes "Phasianella" gosauica Zekeli (1852), and possibly also the new species P? aenigmatica. | |
| Pazinotus martonszaboi | Sp. nov | Valid | Kovács & Vicián | Miocene | Tekeres Schlier Formation | Hungary | A species of Pazinotus. | |
| Persististrombus bogoriense | Sp. nov | Disputed | Liverani | Miocene | | Indonesia | Originally described as a species of Persististrombus; Dekkers & Ćorić (2025) interpreted it as a junior synonym of Javastrombus praegracilis. | |
| Pleurotomaria? plana | Sp. nov | Valid | Ferrari | Early Jurassic (Pliensbachian) | | Argentina | Possibly a species of Pleurotomaria. | |
| Pleurotomaria? trochotomorpha | Sp. nov | Valid | Ferrari | Early Jurassic (Pliensbachian) | | Argentina | Possibly a species of Pleurotomaria. | |
| Ponderia remyi | Sp. nov | Valid | Merle et al. | Eocene | | France | A species of Ponderia. | |
| Potamides mosaliensis | Sp. nov | Valid | Banerjee & Halder | Eocene | Cambay Shale | India | | |
| Potamides shahensis | Sp. nov | Valid | Banerjee & Halder | Eocene | Cambay Shale | India | | |
| Potamolithus fabiani | Sp. nov | Valid | Miquel | Late Cretaceous (Maastrichtian) | Chorrillo Formation | Argentina | A species of Potamolithus. | |
| Predazzella | Gen. et sp. et comb. nov | Valid | Monari & Dellantonio | Middle Triassic (Anisian, possibly also Ladinian) | | Italy | A member of Pleurotomariida possibly belonging to the superfamily Murchisonioidea and the family Plethospiridae. The type species is P. elongata; genus also includes "Cheilotoma" avisii Böhm (1895) and possibly P? monarii Dominici, Danise & Tintori (2024). | |
| Prodotia? wesselyi | Sp. nov | Valid | Harzhauser & Landau | Miocene | Grund Formation | Austria | Possibly a species of Prodotia. | |
| Promathildia gracile | Sp. nov | | Dominici, Danise & Tintori | Middle Triassic (Ladinian) | Pelsa-Vazzoler Lagerstätte | Italy | A member of the family Mathildidae. | |
| Pronucellopsis | Gen. et sp. nov | Valid | Merle in Merle et al. | Paleocene (Thanetian) | | France | A member of the family Muricidae. The type species is P. pacaudi Merle, Ledon & Goret in Merle et al. (2024). | |
| Pseudobellardia sitae | Sp. nov | Valid | Banerjee & Halder | Eocene | Cambay Shale | India | | |
| Pseudofusus balteus | Sp. nov | Valid | Harzhauser, Landau & Vermeij | Miocene | Sámsonháza Formation | Hungary | A species of Pseudofusus. | |
| Pseudofusus rostratoides | Sp. nov | Valid | Harzhauser, Landau & Vermeij | Miocene | Baden Formation | Austria; Hungary | A species of Pseudofusus. | |
| Pseudofusus? schuberthi | Sp. nov | Valid | Harzhauser, Landau & Vermeij | Miocene | Baden Formation | Austria; Czech Republic | Possibly a species of Pseudofusus. | |
| Pseudofusus stahlschmidti | Sp. nov | Valid | Harzhauser, Landau & Vermeij | Miocene | Baden Formation | Austria; Hungary | A species of Pseudofusus. | |
| Pseudorhytidopilus ? quadratus | Sp. nov | Valid | Gründel & Nützel | Late Jurassic (Kimmeridgian) | | Germany | Possibly a member of the family Acmaeidae. | |
| Pseudoscalites karapunari | Sp. nov | | Dominici, Danise & Tintori | Middle Triassic (Ladinian) | Pelsa-Vazzoler Lagerstätte | Italy | A member of the family Purpurinidae. | |
| Pseudotaphrus deshayesi | Nom. nov | Valid | Pacaud in Coan, Pacaud & Kabat | Eocene | | France | A member of the family Zebinidae; a replacement name for Rissoa cincta Deshayes (1861). | |
| Pseudotorinia pliomarthae | Sp. nov | Valid | Brunetti & Della Bella | Pliocene | | Italy; Spain | A species of Pseudotorinia. | |
| Pseudotrophonopsis | Gen. et comb. nov | Valid | Merle in Merle et al. | Eocene and Oligocene | | Belgium; France; United Kingdom | A member of the family Muricidae. The type species is "Buccinum" defossum Pilkington (1804); genus also includes "Murex" subfusiformis d'Orbigny (1852). | |
| Pseudovertagus kondoi | Sp. nov | Valid | Kase et al. | Pliocene | Ananai Formation | Japan | A species of Pseudovertagus. | |
| Pterynotus gaasensis | Sp. nov | Valid | Merle et al. | Oligocene | Gaas Formation | France | A species of Pterynotus. | |
| Pterynotus pelouatensis | Sp. nov | Valid | Merle et al. | Miocene | | France | A species of Pterynotus. | |
| Ptychocerithium shamukum | Sp. nov | Valid | Banerjee & Halder | Eocene | Cambay Shale | India | | |
| Puposyrnola coartata | Nom. nov | Valid | Pacaud in Coan, Pacaud & Kabat | Eocene | | France | A species of Puposyrnola; a replacement name for Turbonilla angusta Deshayes (1861). | |
| Purpurina macrostoma | Comb. nov | Valid | (Kittl) | Late Triassic | | Italy | A member of the family Purpurinidae; moved from Palaeotriton macrostoma Kittl (1894). | |
| Rhinovasum aquitanicum | Comb. nov | Valid | (Peyrot) | Miocene | | France | A member of the family Vasidae. Moved from Vasum subpugillare mut. aquitanicum Peyrot (1928). | |
| Rhinovasum subpugillare | Comb. nov | Valid | (d'Orbigny) | Oligocene | | France | A member of the family Vasidae. Moved from Turbinella subpugillaris d'Orbigny (1852). | |
| Rhinovasum tuberculatum | Comb. nov | Valid | (Gabb) | Miocene | | Dominican Republic; Venezuela | A member of the family Vasidae. Moved from Vasum tuberculatum Gabb (1873). | |
| Rimella rokeyae | Sp. nov | Valid | Banerjee & Halder | Eocene | Cambay Shale | India | | |
| Rimulopsis danuviensis | Sp. nov | Valid | Gründel & Nützel | Late Jurassic (Kimmeridgian) | | Germany | A member of the family Fissurellidae. | |
| Risbecina | Gen. et 10 sp. nov | Valid | Dolin in Dolin, Aguerre & Vaessen | Miocene | | France | A member of the family Cypraeidae. The type species is R. turgidula; genus also includes R. brevicula, R. circulus, R. gibberosa, R. guttula, R. immodica, R. onerosa, R. palliolata, R. sacculus and R. ventriosa. | |
| Rissoina albis | Nom. nov | Valid | Pacaud in Coan, Pacaud & Kabat | Early Cretaceous (Albian) | | France | A species of Rissoina; a replacement name for Melania incerta Leymerie (1842). | |
| Rufilla giacomellii | Sp. nov | Valid | Monari & Dellantonio | Middle Triassic (Anisian) | | Italy | A member of Pleurotomariida belonging to the superfamily Eotomarioidea and the family Rhaphistomellidae. | |
| Rufilla wilckensi | Sp. nov | Valid | Monari & Dellantonio | Middle Triassic (Anisian) | | Italy | A member of Pleurotomariida belonging to the superfamily Eotomarioidea and the family Rhaphistomellidae. | |
| Sandbergeria khanae | Sp. nov | Valid | Banerjee & Halder | Eocene | Cambay Shale | India | | |
| Sandbergeria (Sandbergeria) metalis | Nom. nov | Valid | Pacaud in Coan, Pacaud & Kabat | Eocene | | France | A member of the family Scaliolidae; a replacement name for Cerithium turbinopsis Deshayes (1864). | |
| Schilderina accurata | Sp. nov | Valid | Dolin in Dolin, Aguerre & Vaessen | Miocene | | France | A species of Schilderina. | |
| Schilderina bifidata | Sp. nov | Valid | Dolin in Dolin, Aguerre & Vaessen | Miocene | | France | A species of Schilderina. | |
| Schilderina delicata | Sp. nov | Valid | Dolin in Dolin, Aguerre & Vaessen | Miocene | | France | A species of Schilderina. | |
| Schilderina eclogaria | Sp. nov | Valid | Dolin in Dolin, Aguerre & Vaessen | Miocene | | France | A species of Schilderina. | |
| Schilderina fusiformis | Sp. nov | Valid | Dolin in Dolin, Aguerre & Vaessen | Miocene | | France | A species of Schilderina. | |
| Schilderina gemella | Sp. nov | Valid | Dolin in Dolin, Aguerre & Vaessen | Miocene | | France | A species of Schilderina. | |
| Schilderina hierografica | Sp. nov | Valid | Dolin in Dolin, Aguerre & Vaessen | Miocene | | France | A species of Schilderina. | |
| Schilderina jucunda | Sp. nov | Valid | Dolin in Dolin, Aguerre & Vaessen | Miocene | | France | A species of Schilderina. | |
| Schilderina oblongula | Sp. nov | Valid | Dolin in Dolin, Aguerre & Vaessen | Miocene | | France | A species of Schilderina. | |
| Schilderina quaesita | Sp. nov | Valid | Dolin in Dolin, Aguerre & Vaessen | Miocene | | France | A species of Schilderina. | |
| Schilderina regifica | Sp. nov | Valid | Dolin in Dolin, Aguerre & Vaessen | Miocene | | France | A species of Schilderina. | |
| Schilderina sphaerula | Sp. nov | Valid | Dolin in Dolin, Aguerre & Vaessen | Miocene | | France | A species of Schilderina. | |
| Schilderina uncinata | Sp. nov | Valid | Dolin in Dolin, Aguerre & Vaessen | Miocene | | France | A species of Schilderina. | |
| Schizogonium letiziae | Sp. nov | | Dominici, Danise & Tintori | Middle Triassic (Ladinian) | Pelsa-Vazzoler Lagerstätte | Italy | | |
| Scurriopsis (Hennocquia) cagnadensis | Sp. nov | Valid | Ferrari | Early Jurassic (Toarcian) | | Argentina | Possibly a member of the family Acmaeidae. | |
| Scurriopsis cragolis | Sp. nov | Valid | Gründel & Nützel | Late Jurassic (Kimmeridgian) | | Germany | A member of the family Acmaeidae. | |
| Scurriopsis (Hennocquia) sanjuanensis | Sp. nov | Valid | Ferrari | Early Jurassic (Toarcian) | | Argentina | Possibly a member of the family Acmaeidae. | |
| Semicassis poustagnacensis | Sp. nov | Valid | Lozouet & Lesport | Oligocene | | France | A species of Semicassis. | |
| Semicypraea delannoyi | Sp. nov | Valid | Pacaud | Eocene (Lutetian) | | France | A member of the family Cypraeidae belonging to the subfamily Gisortiinae. | |
| Serratocerithium indicum | Sp. nov | Valid | Banerjee & Halder | Eocene | Cambay Shale | India | | |
| Serrettella gerberi | Comb. nov | Valid | (Gründel, Keupp & Lang) | Late Jurassic (Kimmeridgian) | | Germany | A member of the family Nododelphinulidae; moved from Amphitrochus? gerberi Gründel, Keupp & Lang (2017). | |
| Simplicula carsteni | Sp. nov | Valid | Groh & Hutterer in Groh, Hutterer & Martín | Pleistocene | | Spain (Canary Islands) | A member of the family Canariellidae. | |
| Simplicula juliae | Sp. nov | Valid | Groh in Groh, Hutterer & Martín | Pliocene and Quaternary | | Spain (Canary Islands) | A member of the family Canariellidae. | |
| Simplicula justusi | Sp. nov | Valid | Groh in Groh, Hutterer & Martín | Quaternary | | Spain (Canary Islands) | A member of the family Canariellidae. | |
| Simplicula kittelorum | Sp. nov | Valid | Groh & Hutterer in Groh, Hutterer & Martín | Quaternary | | Spain (Canary Islands) | A member of the family Canariellidae. | |
| Simplicula marconeiberi | Sp. nov | Valid | Groh, Hutterer & Martín | Pliocene | | Spain (Canary Islands) | A member of the family Canariellidae. | |
| Simplicula rainerhuttereri | Sp. nov | Valid | Groh & Martín in Groh, Hutterer & Martín | Pliocene | | Spain (Canary Islands) | A member of the family Canariellidae. | |
| Simplicula roja | Sp. nov | Valid | Hutterer & Groh in Groh, Hutterer & Martín | Pleistocene | | Spain (Canary Islands) | A member of the family Canariellidae. | |
| Siphonalia kalpanae | Sp. nov | Valid | Banerjee & Halder | Eocene | Cambay Shale | India | | |
| Siphonalia pritilatae | Sp. nov | Valid | Banerjee & Halder | Eocene | Cambay Shale | India | | |
| Snyderifusus | Gen. et comb. nov | Valid | Harzhauser, Landau & Vermeij | Miocene | | Austria; Bosnia and Herzegovina; Hungary; Poland; Romania | A member of the family Fasciolariidae. The type species is "Fusus" prevosti Hörnes (1853). | |
| Sthenorytis garigor | Nom. nov | Valid | Cilia | Miocene (Langhian to Tortonian) | Upper Globigerina Limestone Formation | Malta | A wentletrap; a replacement name for Scalaria melitensis Cowper Reed in Baldacchino (1939). | |
| Strepsidura reticulata | Sp. nov | Valid | Banerjee & Halder | Eocene | Cambay Shale | India | | |
| Striactaeonina ingens | Sp. nov | | Dominici, Danise & Tintori | Middle Triassic (Ladinian) | Pelsa-Vazzoler Lagerstätte | Italy | A member of Acteonoidea belonging to the family Tubiferidae. | |
| Striactaeonina minor | Sp. nov | Valid | Ferrari | Middle Jurassic (Aalenian) | | Argentina | A member of the family Tubiferidae. | |
| Stuorella crenulata | Sp. nov | Valid | Monari & Dellantonio | Middle Triassic (Anisian) | | Italy | A member of Pleurotomariida belonging to the superfamily Pleurotomarioidea and the family Stuorellidae. | |
| Sulcoactaeon sabattinae | Sp. nov | Valid | Ferrari | Middle Jurassic (Aalenian) | | Argentina | A member of Acteonoidea belonging to the family Bullinidae. | |
| Takashius kantori | Sp. nov | Valid | Harzhauser, Landau & Vermeij | Miocene | Dej Formation | Romania | A member of the family Fasciolariidae. | |
| Takashius vinculum | Sp. nov | Valid | Harzhauser, Landau & Vermeij | Miocene | Dej Formation | Austria; Bulgaria; Czech Republic; Hungary; Romania | A member of the family Fasciolariidae. | |
| Talantodiscus gujaratensis | Sp. nov | Valid | Saha et al. | Late Jurassic (Tithonian) | | India | A member of the family Pleurotomariidae. | |
| Tapinotomaria longstaffae | Sp. nov | Valid | Karapunar, Todd & Nützel | Carboniferous (Viséan) | Lower Limestone Formation | United Kingdom | A member of the family Phymatopleuridae. | |
| Tarantinaea micalii | Sp. nov | Valid | Landau & Harzhauser | Pliocene | | Spain | A species of Tarantinaea. | |
| Teinostoma maryae | Sp. nov | Valid | Banerjee & Halder | Eocene | Cambay Shale | India | A species of Teinostoma. | |
| Telankhedilymnaea | Gen. et comb. nov | Valid | Delvene et al. | Cretaceous-Paleogene transition | | India | A member of the family Lymnaeidae. Genus includes "Lymnaea" subulata. | |
| Temnotropis maestroettorei | Sp. nov | Valid | Monari & Dellantonio | Middle Triassic (Anisian) | | Italy | A member of Pleurotomariida belonging to the family Temnotropidae. | |
| Tethyspollia | Gen. et comb. nov | Valid | Harzhauser & Landau | Miocene | | Bulgaria; Romania | A member of the family Prodotiidae. The type species is "Pollia" mariae Hoernes & Auinger (1890); genus also includes "Cantharus (Pollia)" beregovi Kojumdgieva in Kojumdgieva & Strachimirov (1960). | |
| Tetranota argentina | Sp. nov | Valid | Ferrari, Bertero & Carrera | Ordovician (Sandbian) | La Pola Formation | Argentina | A member of the family Bucaniidae. | |
| Textiliomurex chodmonensis | Sp. nov | Valid | Merle et al. | Eocene | | France | A member of the family Muricidae. | |
| Texturaspira | Gen. et comb. nov | Valid | Monari & Dellantonio | Middle Triassic (Anisian) | | China; Italy | A member of Pleurotomariida belonging to the superfamily Pleurotomarioidea and the family Wortheniellidae. The type species is "Worthenia" supraornata Kittl (1895); genus also includes "Worthenia" tuberculifera Koken (1900) and "Worthenia" ligylirae Yin & Yochelson (1983). | |
| Tibia cluzaudi | Sp. nov | Valid | Liverani & Wieneke | Oligocene | | France | A species of Tibia. | |
| Timbellus calciacus | Sp. nov | Valid | Merle et al. | Eocene | | France | A species of Timbellus. | |
| Timbellus curvispina | Sp. nov | Valid | Merle et al. | Eocene | | France | A species of Timbellus. | |
| Timbellus longicanalis | Sp. nov | Valid | Merle et al. | Eocene | | France | A species of Timbellus. | |
| Timbellus magnei | Nom. nov | Valid | Merle et al. | Eocene | | France | A species of Timbellus; a replacement name for Murex trigonus Rouault (1850). | |
| Timbellus magnificus | Sp. nov | Valid | Merle et al. | Eocene | | France | A species of Timbellus. | |
| Timbellus occidentalis | Sp. nov | Valid | Merle et al. | Eocene | | France | A species of Timbellus. | |
| Timbellus radulfiensis | Sp. nov | Valid | Merle et al. | Eocene | Argiles à Corbules Formation | France | A species of Timbellus. | |
| Timbellus sixi | Sp. nov | Valid | Merle et al. | Eocene | | France | A species of Timbellus. | |
| Timbellus submicropterus | Sp. nov | Valid | Merle et al. | Eocene | | France | A species of Timbellus. | |
| Trachynerita tenuicostata | Sp. nov | | Dominici, Danise & Tintori | Middle Triassic (Ladinian) | Pelsa-Vazzoler Lagerstätte | Italy | A member of Neritoidea belonging to the family Neritariidae. | |
| Triadoskenea alpicornu | Sp. nov | | Dominici, Danise & Tintori | Middle Triassic (Ladinian) | Pelsa-Vazzoler Lagerstätte | Italy | A member of the family Cortinellidae. | |
| Tricolnaticopsis elongatus | Sp. nov | | Dominici, Danise & Tintori | Middle Triassic (Ladinian) | Pelsa-Vazzoler Lagerstätte | Italy | | |
| Trubatsa calviniacensis | Sp. nov | Valid | Merle et al. | Eocene | | France | A species of Trubatsa. | |
| Trubatsa ganensis | Sp. nov | Valid | Merle et al. | Eocene | | France | A species of Trubatsa. | |
| Truncaria vallismunda | Nom. nov | Valid | Pacaud in Coan, Pacaud & Kabat | Eocene | | France | A species of Truncaria; a replacement name for Buccinum truncatum Deshayes (1835). | |
| Trypanaxis mauriniacus | Nom. nov | Valid | Pacaud in Coan, Pacaud & Kabat | Oligocene | | France | A member of the family Trypanaxidae; a replacement name for Cerithium sandbergeri Deshayes (1864). | |
| Turonadusta | Gen. et 2 sp. nov | Valid | Dolin in Dolin, Aguerre & Vaessen | Miocene | | France | A member of the family Cypraeidae. The type species is T. gagnaisoni Dolin; genus also includes T. lesporti Dolin & Aguerre. | |
| Turritella bardhani | Sp. nov | | Halder in Mondal et al. | Late Cretaceous (Turonian) | Nodular Limestone Formation | India | A species of Turritella. | |
| Turritella lucagrita | Sp. nov | Valid | Gründel & Nützel | Late Jurassic (Kimmeridgian) | | Germany | A species of Turritella. | |
| Vayssierella | Gen. et comb. et 8 sp. nov | Valid | Dolin in Dolin, Aguerre & Vaessen | Miocene | | France; Italy | A member of the family Cypraeidae. The type species is "Cypraea" longiscata Mayer (1875); genus also includes new species V. aculeata, V. edita, V. firmata, V. houssayi, V. insignata, V. macilenta, V. nescita and V. tenuicula. | |
| Vermicularia katiae | Sp. nov | Valid | Anderson & Allmon | Miocene–Pliocene | | Dominican Republic | A species of Vermicularia. Published online in 2024, but the issue date is listed as December 2023. | |
| Viennella baluki | Sp. nov | Valid | Biskupič | Miocene (Serravallian) | Studienka Formation | Slovakia | A member of the family Turritellidae. | |
| Viezzenella | Gen. et sp. nov | Valid | Monari & Dellantonio | Middle Triassic (Anisian) | | Italy | A member of Pleurotomariida belonging to the superfamily Eotomarioidea and the family Rhaphistomellidae. The type species is V. ruvida. | |
| Xenofusinus | Gen. et comb. nov | Valid | Harzhauser, Landau & Vermeij | Miocene | | Austria; Germany | A member of the family Fasciolariidae. The type species is "Fusus" haueri Hoernes (1875). | |
| Zonaria aartae | Sp. nov | Valid | Dolin & Vaessen in Dolin, Aguerre & Vaessen | Miocene | | France | A species of Zonaria. | |
| Zonaria buurmani | Sp. nov | Valid | Dolin & Vaessen in Dolin, Aguerre & Vaessen | Miocene | | France | A species of Zonaria. | |
| Zonaria globularis | Sp. nov | Valid | Dolin in Dolin, Aguerre & Vaessen | Miocene | | France | A species of Zonaria. | |
| Zonaria jansei | Sp. nov | Valid | Dolin in Dolin, Aguerre & Vaessen | Miocene | | France | A species of Zonaria. | |
| Zonaria jansseni | Sp. nov | Valid | Dolin & Vaessen in Dolin, Aguerre & Vaessen | Miocene | | France | A species of Zonaria. | |
| Zonaria macricula | Sp. nov | Valid | Dolin in Dolin, Aguerre & Vaessen | Miocene | | France | A species of Zonaria. | |
| Zonaria nieulandei | Sp. nov | Valid | Dolin & Vaessen in Dolin, Aguerre & Vaessen | Miocene | | France | A species of Zonaria. | |
| Zonaria ponderi | Sp. nov | Valid | Dolin in Dolin, Aguerre & Vaessen | Miocene | | France | A species of Zonaria. | |
| Zonaria resupina | Sp. nov | Valid | Dolin in Dolin, Aguerre & Vaessen | Miocene | | France | A species of Zonaria. | |
| Zonaria vokesorum | Sp. nov | Valid | Dolin in Dolin, Aguerre & Vaessen | Miocene | | France | A species of Zonaria. | |
| Zygopleura elongata | Sp. nov | | Dominici, Danise & Tintori | Middle Triassic (Ladinian) | Pelsa-Vazzoler Lagerstätte | Italy | | |

=== Gastropod research ===
- A study on the phylogenetic relationships of members of Pleurotomariida is published by Karapunar, Höhna & Nützel (2024).
- Sun et al. (2024) describe fossils of large-bodied members of the genus Toxoconcha from the Middle Triassic Qingyan biota (Guizhou, China), estimating the largest specimen to have original height of around 350 mm.
- Merle, Goldstein & McKinney (2024) report cases of cannibalism in Crassimurex calcitrapa from the Eocene strata from the Paris Basin (France), representing the earliest occurrence of this behavior in the muricid fossil record.
- Evidence of preservation of intact polyene pigments in gastropod shells from the Miocene Vienna Basin (Austria and Hungary) is presented by Wolkenstein, Schmidt & Harzhauser (2024).
- A study on the diversity of Miocene gastropods from the Central Paratethys, providing evidence of a Middle Miocene species richness hotspot resulting from the formation of an archipelago-like landscape and the Middle Miocene Climatic Optimum, as well as evidence of subsequent decline in biodiversity related to the Middle Miocene disruption, is published by Harzhauser et al. (2024).
- Tattersfield et al. (2024) study the ecological associations of extant terrestrial gastropods from the Laetoli-Endulen area (Tanzania) and compare them with Pliocene gastropod assemblages from Laetoli, interpreting gastropods from the Lower Laetolil beds as indicative of semi-arid environment, those from the Upper Laetolil Beds as indicative of a mosaic of forest, woodland and bushland habitats, and gastropods from the Upper Ndolanya Beds as indicative of humid environment.
- Evidence of a complex evolution of body size in gastropods from western Atlantic throughout the Pliocene-Pleistocene transition is presented by Anderson et al. (2024).
- Evidence of coordinated response of endemic Microcolpia and Theodoxus prevostianus from Lake Pețea (Romania) to Late Glacial and Holocene climate changes resulting in lake level changes, thermal water pulses and changes of availability of calcium and magnesium in shell construction is presented by Gulyás & Sümegi (2024).

== Other molluscs ==
| Name | Novelty | Status | Authors | Age | Type locality | Location | Notes | Images |
|---|---|---|---|---|---|---|---|---|
| Agidelia | Gen. et sp. nov | | Mazaev | Permian | | Russia | A member of Rostroconchia belonging to the family Bransoniidae. Genus includes new species A. magnifica. Published online in 2024, but the issue date is listed as December 2023. | |
| Arceodomus fredericksi | Sp. nov | Valid | Mazaev | Permian | | Russia | A member of Rostroconchia. Published online in 2024, but the issue date is listed as December 2023. | |
| Ashaconcha | Gen. et sp. nov | | Mazaev | Permian | | Russia | A member of Rostroconchia belonging to the family Bransoniidae. Genus includes new species A. rara. Published online in 2024, but the issue date is listed as December 2023. | |
| Hoarepora uralica | Sp. nov | | Mazaev | Permian | | Russia | A member of Rostroconchia belonging to the family Bransoniidae. Published online in 2024, but the issue date is listed as December 2023. | |
| Hookisplax | Gen. et sp. nov | Valid | Sigwart, Wyse Jackson & Parkes | Carboniferous (Tournaisian) | Hook Head Formation | Ireland | A chiton belonging to the subclass Paleoloricata and to the order Septemchitonida. The type species is H. byrneae. | |
| Lekiskochiton crassus | Sp. nov | Valid | Mazaev | Permian | | Russia | A lepidopleurid chiton. | |
| Ochmazochiton uralensis | Sp. nov | Valid | Mazaev | Permian (Sakmarian) | | Russia | A chiton. | |
| Plaxiphora luzanovkae | Sp. nov | Valid | Sirenko & Dell'Angelo | Paleocene | Luzanovka Beds | Ukraine | A chiton, a species of Plaxiphora. | |
| Ressericonella | Gen. et comb. et sp. nov | Valid | Oh & Peel | Cambrian Stage 4 and Wuliuan | Langston Formation | Greenland; United States (Idaho) | A member of the family Helcionellidae. The type species is "Helcionella" aequa Resser (1939); genus also includes new species R. pipalukae. | |
| Tritonophon grimsbyensis | Sp. nov | Valid | Pratt, Hopkins & Hopkins | Silurian (Llandovery) | Grimsby Formation | Canada (Ontario) | A member of Bellerophontida. | |

=== Other molluscan research ===
- Redescription of the rostroconch species Pseudoconocardium licharewi is published by Mazaev & Biakov (2024).

== General research ==
- Wang et al. (2024) study Cambrian trace fossils assigned to the ichnogenus Climactichnites from the Elk Mound Group (Blackberry Hill, Wisconsin, United States), Archaeonassa from the Sellick Hill Formation (Australia) and Palaeobullia from the Buen Formation (Greenland), produced by animals moving on land millions of years before full terrestrialization, and interpret molluscs as most likely tracemakers; in the online supplemental material of the study the authors also argue that trace fossils from the Elk Mound Group assigned to the ichnogenus Protichnites resemble traces produced by marine gastropods, and that their asymmetry might be a result of chirality of mollusc shells.
- Roopnarine & Goodwin (2024) develop a new geometric model explaining the evolution of such features of conchiferan molluscs as coiling of the shell and bivalved type shells.
- A study on changes of composition of the Omma-Manganji mollusc fauna from the Sea of Japan in response to environmental changes during the Pliocene and Pleistocene is published by Amano (2024).
- Antoine et al. (2024) report the discovery of fossil material from Kourou (French Guiana) providing evidence of the presence of diverse foraminifer, plant and animal communities near the equator in the 130,000-115,000 years ago time interval, including evidence of the presence of a diverse mollusc assemblage indicative of stronger affinities between Guianas and the Caribbean than today.
