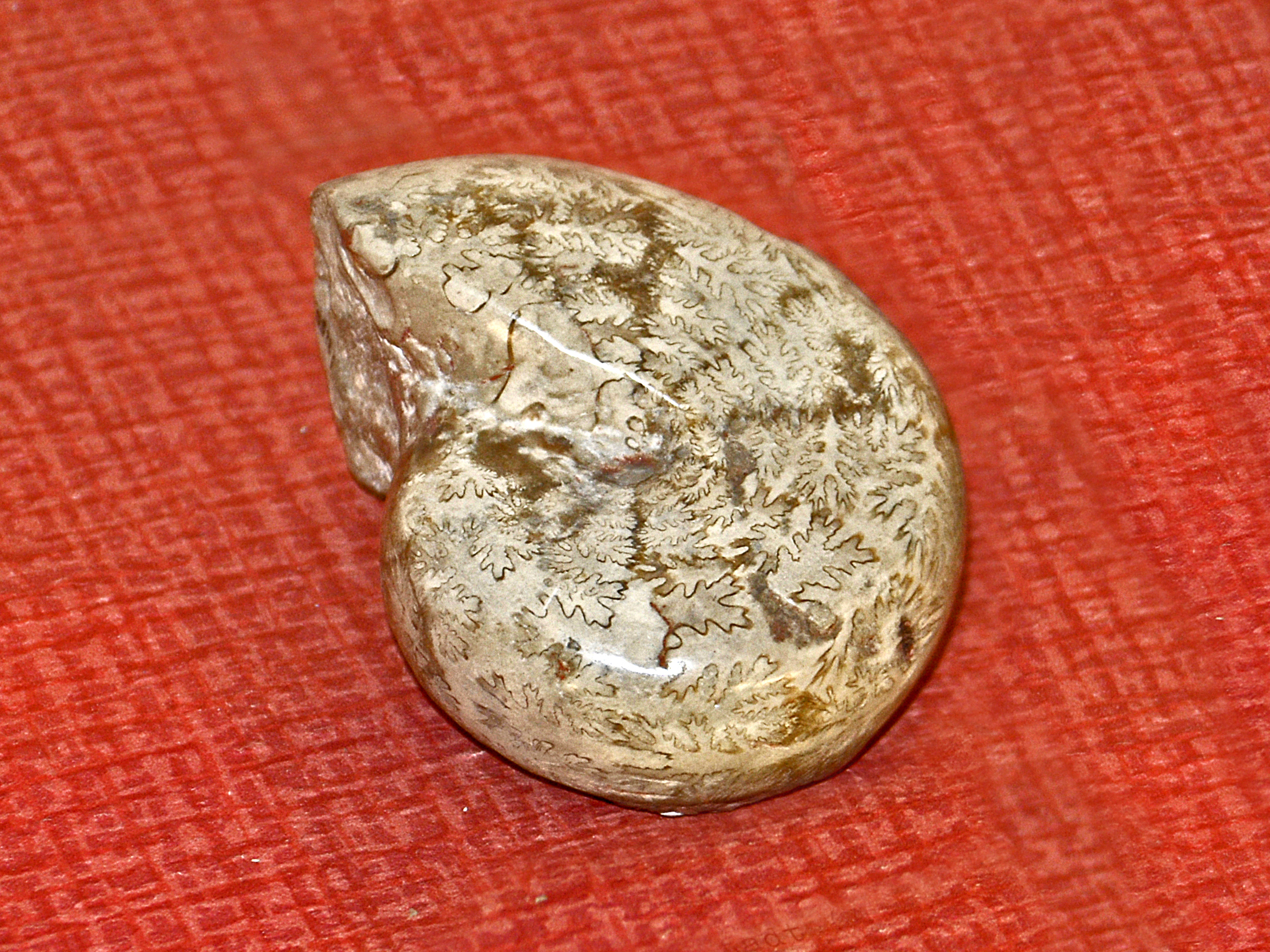
- Polished fossil shell of Cladiscites species from Austria, on display at Galerie de paléontologie et d'anatomie comparée in Paris

Scientific classification
- Kingdom: Animalia
- Phylum: Mollusca
- Class: Cephalopoda
- Subclass: †Ammonoidea
- Order: †Ceratitida
- Family: †Cladiscitidae
- Genus: †Cladiscites de Haan (1825)

Species
- C. mendenhalli Smith 1927; C. tornatus Hauer 1846; C. ungeri Klipstein 1843

= Cladiscites =

Cladiscites Temporal range: Carnian–Rhaetian

Extinct genus of molluscs

Cladiscites is an extinct genus of cephalopods in the ammonoid order Ceratitida. These nektonic carnivores lived during the Triassic, from Carnian to Rhaetian age.

== Distribution ==
Fossils of species within this family have been found in the Triassic of Afghanistan, Hungary, Italy, Oman, Tajikistan, United States and the East Indies.
