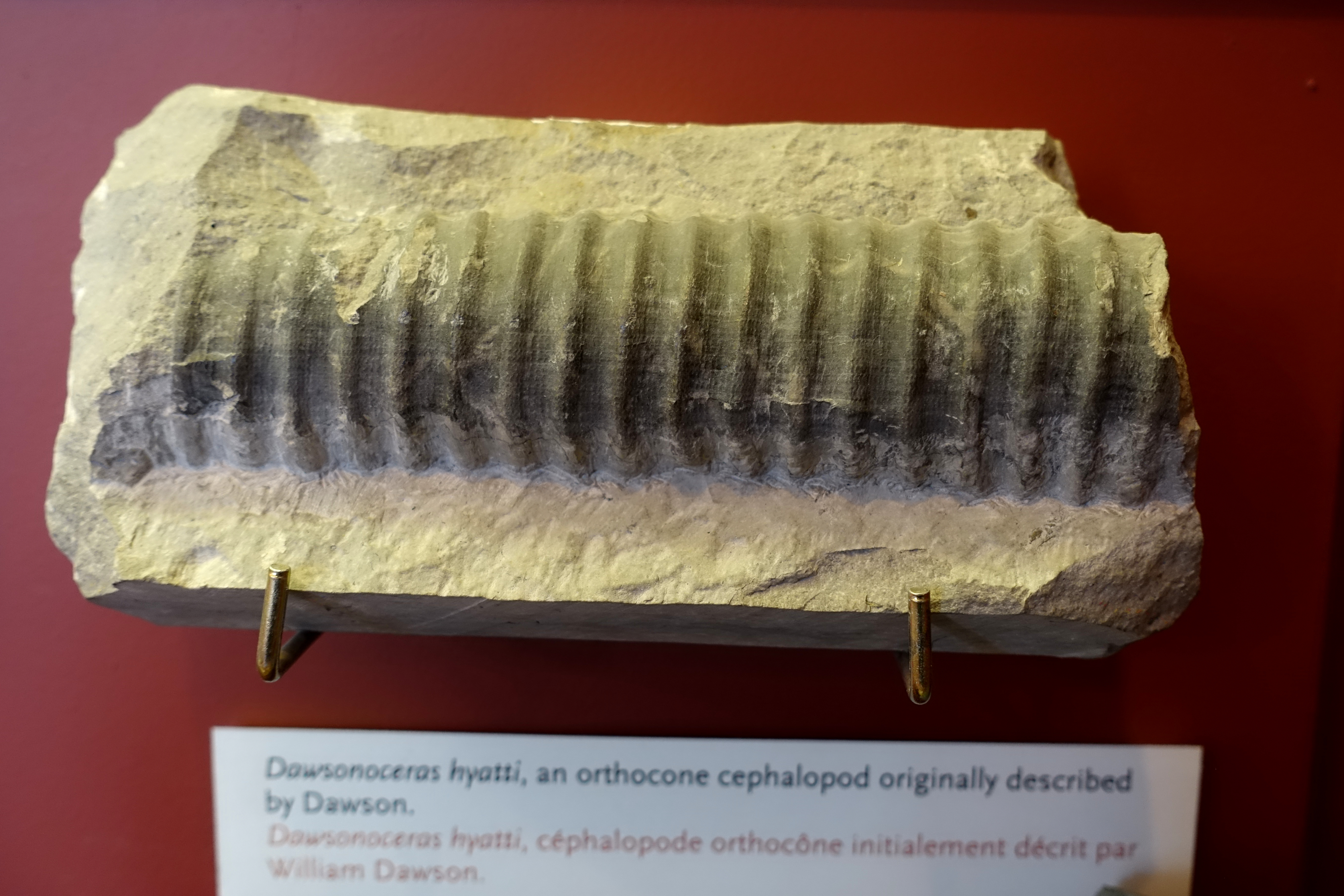
- Dawsonoceras hyatti

Scientific classification
- Kingdom: Animalia
- Phylum: Mollusca
- Class: Cephalopoda
- Order: †Orthocerida
- Family: †Dawsonoceratidae; Flower (1946)

= Dawsonoceratidae =

Dawsonoceratidae Temporal range: ?UOrd-?M Dev

Extinct family of molluscs

Dawsonoceratidae is an extinct family of orthoconic nautiloid cephalopods that lived in what would be North America and Europe from the Late Ordovician through the Middle Devonian from about 480–390 mya, existing for approximately 90 million years.

== Taxonomic Position ==
Dawsonoceratidae was named by Flower (1962) and included in the Michelinoceratida. It was assigned to the Orthocerida by Walter Sweet in Teichert et al. 1964 as part of the Orthocerataceae. The type genus is Dawsonoceras, named by Hyatt in 1883.

== Morphology ==
Dawsonoceratidae are michelinocerids (Orthocerida) with the internal pattern of the Michelinoceratidae except that the siphuncle segments, which are generally tubular, are constricted at the septal foremina (the openings through with the siphuncular tissues pass). This feature is also found in Silurian Kionoceras, but less developed. Septal necks are short and generally recumbent. The type genus, Dawsonoceras and its close relative Dawsonocerina are further characterized by having orthoconic shells with conspicuous annulations, covered by transverse, scalloped or festooned lirae which in some are also longitudinal. Annulations consist of narrow encircling ribs that may be somewhat oblique, separated by generally wider areas in between

== Genera ==
The Dawsonoceratidae comprise six known genera, Dawsonoceras, the type, Anaspyroceras, Calocyrtocerina, Dawsonocerina, Metaspyroceras, and Palaeodawsonocerina.

Anaspyroceras, named by Shimizu and Obata (1935) and Metaspyroceras, named by Foeste (1932), were previously included in the orthoceratid subfamily Leuroceratinae, which is no longer considered a valid taxon, and reassigned to the Dawsonoceratidae. Anaspyroceras and Metaspyroceras differ from Flowers definition of the Dawsonoceratidae in that the septal necks are orthochoanitic rather than recumbent and siphuncle segments are without noted constrictions. Calocyrtocerina, named by Chen (1981) was originally included in the Paraphragmitidae of Flower and Kümmel 1950. Palaeodawsonocerina started off as Spyroceras senckenbergi Teichert (1932) and redefined by Kroger and Isakar (2006) as the type species of Paleodawsonocerina (P. senckenbergi)
