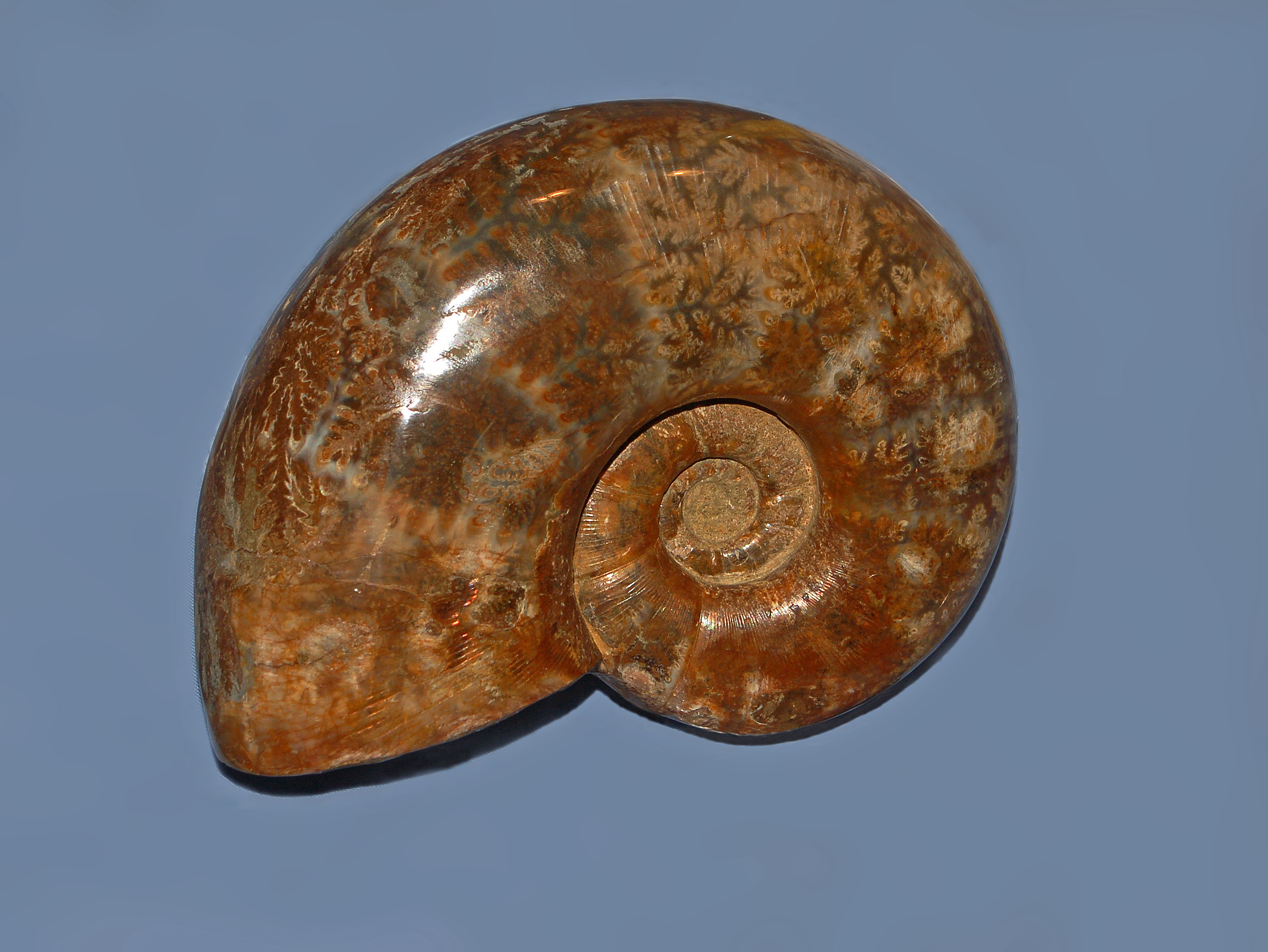
- Tetragonites sp., Cretaceous, Madagascar

Scientific classification
- Kingdom: Animalia
- Phylum: Mollusca
- Class: Cephalopoda
- Subclass: †Ammonoidea
- Order: †Ammonitida
- Suborder: †Lytoceratina
- Family: †Tetragonitidae

Subgroups
- See text

= Tetragonitidae =

Tetragonitidae Temporal range: Aptian–Maastrichtian

Extinct family of ammonites

Tetragonitidae is a family of Cretaceous lytoceratin ammonites typically with square or trapezoidal whorl section at least during some growth stage. Members of this family are usually smooth but some lirate or striate, often with constrictions. Other features include suture with a varying number of auxiliary saddles, and an internal suture with two or more. Major saddles are irregularly trifid. The family is derived from the genus Tetragonites.

== Taxonomy ==
Presently the Tetragonitidae are divided into two subfamilies:

- subfam. Gabbioceratinae
  - Gabbioceras
  - Jauberticeras
- subfam. Tetragonitinae
  - Parajaubertella
  - Takahashia
  - Tetragonites

The Tetragonitidae have also been known as the Tetragonitinae, a subfamily of the Tetrogonitidae (sensu Arkell et al., 1957) which also included the Gaudryderatinae, which has since been elevated to the full family Gaudriceratidae.
