= Afromaenioceras =

Scientific classification
- Kingdom: Animalia
- Phylum: Mollusca
- Class: Cephalopoda
- Subclass: †Ammonoidea
- Order: †Agoniatitida
- Family: †Maenioceratidae
- Genus: †Afromaenioceras; Bensaïd, 1974

Species
- A. bensaidi; A. brumale; A. crassum; A. hiemale; A. sulcatostriatum (type)

Synonyms
- Maenioceras (Afromaenioceras); Maenioceras crassum - synonym of A. crassum; Maenioceras sulcatostriatum - synonym of A. sulcatostriatum

Genus of ammonites

Afromaenioceras (African Maenioceras) was a genus of maenioceratid ammonite from the Devonian of Morocco. It was originally named with two species A. sulcatostriatum and A. crassum, but in 2024 three new species were named; A. bensaidi, A. brumale and A. hiemale.
