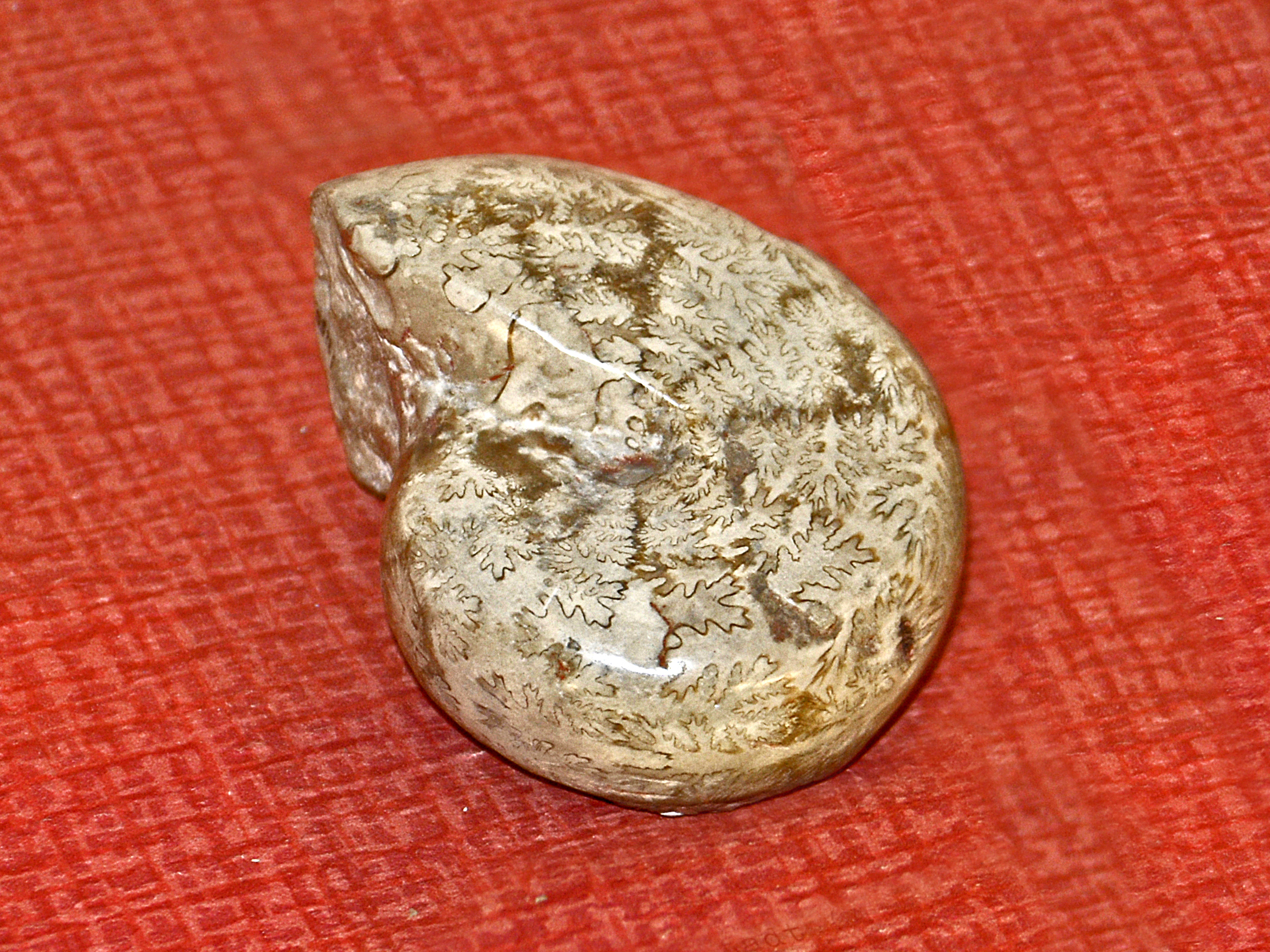
- Polished fossil shell of Cladiscites species from Austria, on display at Galerie de paléontologie et d'anatomie comparée in Paris

Scientific classification
- Kingdom: Animalia
- Phylum: Mollusca
- Class: Cephalopoda
- Subclass: †Ammonoidea
- Order: †Ceratitida
- Family: †Cladiscitidae; Zittel 1884

Genera
- Cladiscites; Hypocladiscites; Mesocladiscites; Neocladiscites; Paracladiscites; Phyllocladiscites; Procladiscites; Psilocladiscites; Sphaerocladiscites

= Cladiscitidae =

Cladiscitidae Temporal range: 247.2 –201.6 Ma

Family of molluscs (fossil)

Cladiscitidae is an extinct family of cephalopods in the ammonoid order Ceratitida. These nektonic carnivores lived during the Triassic.

== Distribution ==
Fossils of species within this family have been found in the Triassic of Afghanistan, Albania, Canada, China, Greece, Hungary, Iran, Italy, Oman, Russia, Slovenia, Turkey, and the United States.
