= Crassimurex =

Scientific classification
- Kingdom: Animalia
- Phylum: Mollusca
- Class: Gastropoda
- Subclass: Caenogastropoda
- Order: Neogastropoda
- Superfamily: Muricoidea
- Family: Muricidae
- Subfamily: Muricinae
- Genus: †Crassimurex; Merle, 1990

Subgenera
- Crassimurex (Crassimurex); Crassimurex (Eopaziella); Crassimurex (Pliocrassimurex)

Extinct genus of gastropods

Crassimurex is an extinct genus of sea snails, marine gastropod mollusks, in the family Muricidae, the murex snails or rock snails.

== Species ==
- Crassimurex (Crassimurex)
  - Crassimurex (Crassimurex) calcitrapa
- Crassimurex (Eopaziella)
  - Crassimurex (Eopaziella) algortis
  - Crassimurex (Eopaziella) zoltani
  - Crassimurex (Eopaziella) capito
- Crassimurex (Pliocrassimurex)
  - Crassimurex (Pliocrassimurex) hirtus
