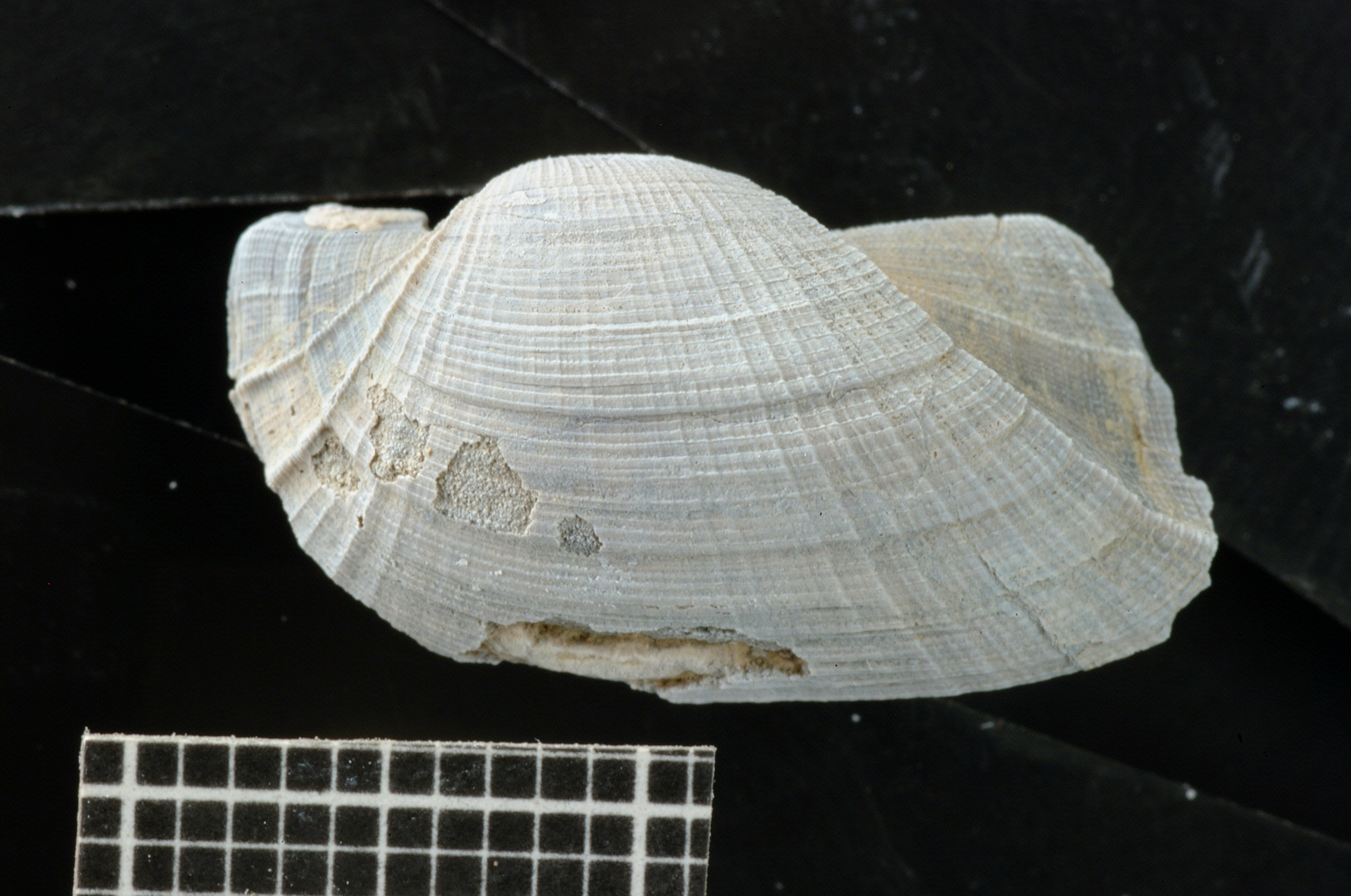
- Grammatodon securis

Scientific classification
- Kingdom: Animalia
- Phylum: Mollusca
- Class: Bivalvia
- Order: Arcida
- Superfamily: Arcoidea
- Family: Parallelodontidae

Genera
- 4, See text

= Parallelodontidae =

Family of bivalves

Parallelodontidae is a family of saltwater clams, marine bivalve molluscs that are related to the ark clams. This family contains at least four genera.

== Species ==
Species within the family Parallelodontidae includes:

- Grammatodon
- Parallelodon
  - Parallelodon rugosus
- Pleurogrammatodon
- Porterius
  - Porterius dalli
