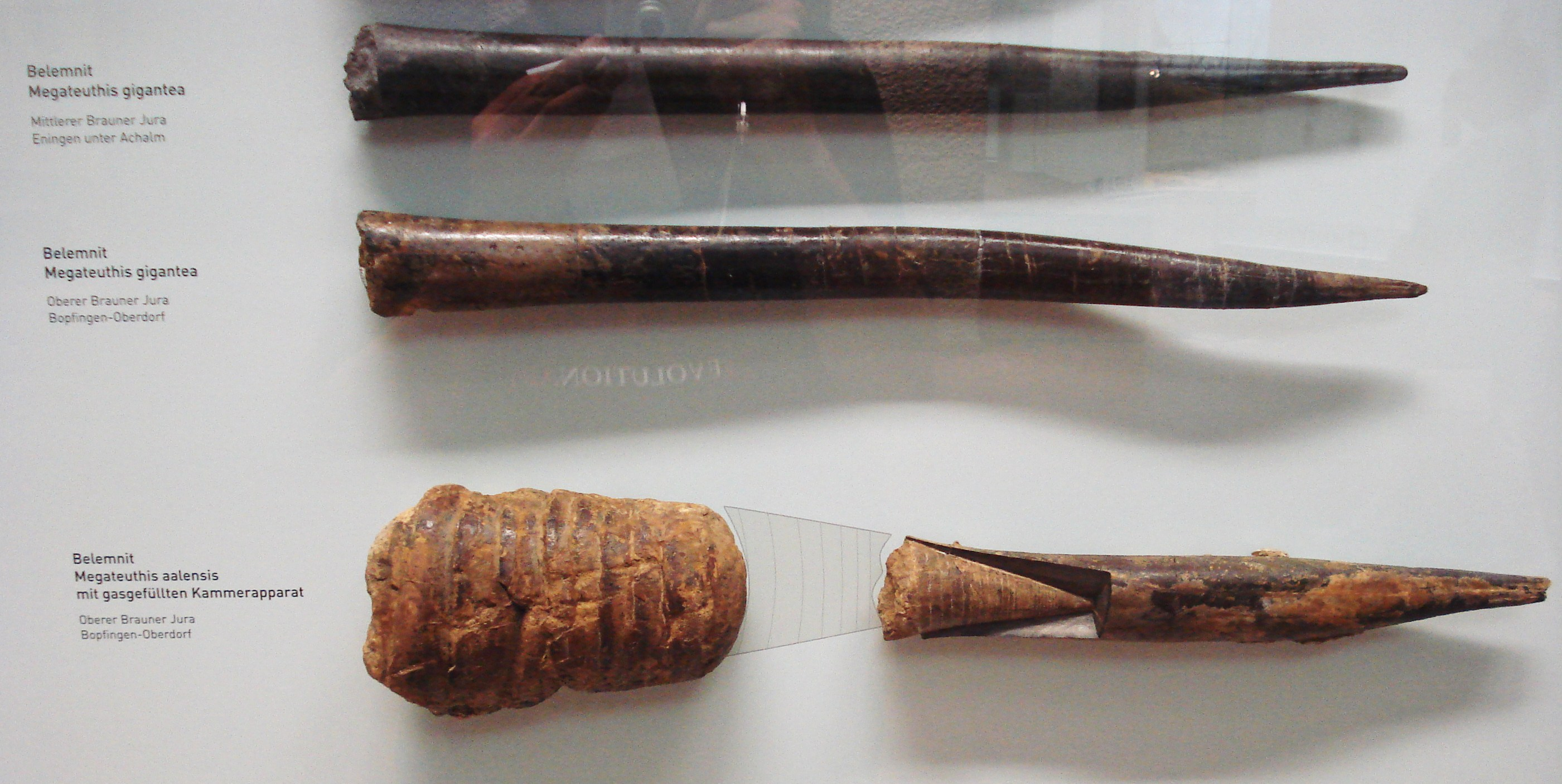
- Fossilised guards of Megateuthis

Scientific classification
- Domain: Eukaryota
- Kingdom: Animalia
- Phylum: Mollusca
- Class: Cephalopoda
- Order: †Belemnitida
- Family: †Megateuthididae
- Genus: †Megateuthis; Bayle, 1878

Type species
- †Belemnites giganteus (von Schlotheim, 1820) by subsequent designation (Douvillé, 1879, p. 91)

Species
- †M. suevica Klein, 1773; †M. elliptica Miller, 1826

= Megateuthis =

Megateuthis Temporal range: Toarcian–Bajocian

Megateuthis is the largest known belemnite genus which lived during the Early to Middle Jurassic, between the Toarcian and Bajocian age. The type species M. suevica, whose junior synonym is M. gigantea, measured around 2.17 metres (7.1 ft) long, and the largest species M. elliptica possibly reached up to 3.11 metres (10.2 ft) long.

== See also ==
- Cephalopod size
- List of belemnites
