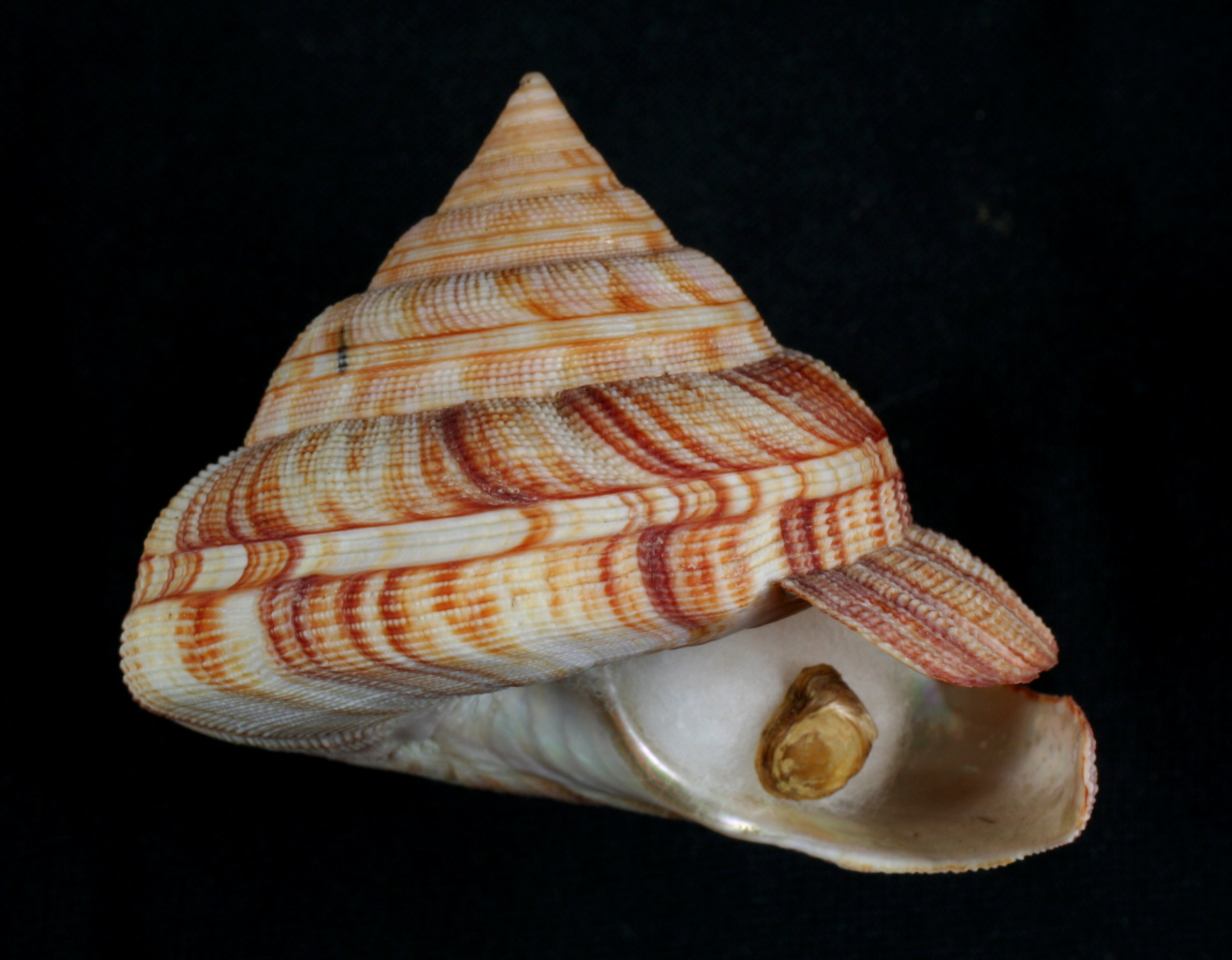
- Apertural view of Perotrochus atlanticus

Scientific classification
- Kingdom: Animalia
- Phylum: Mollusca
- Class: Gastropoda
- Subclass: Vetigastropoda
- Order: Pleurotomariida
- Superfamily: Pleurotomarioidea
- Family: Pleurotomariidae
- Genus: Perotrochus; Fischer, 1885

Type species
- Perotrochus quoyana Fischer & Bernardi, 1856

Synonyms
- Pleurotomaria (Perotrochus) Fischer 1885

= Perotrochus =

Genus of gastropods

Perotrochus is a genus of large sea snails with gills and an operculum, marine gastropod mollusks in the family Pleurotomariidae, the slit snails, (according to the taxonomy of the Gastropoda by Bouchet & Rocroi, 2005).

== Description ==
The shell has a conical shape. The base is not umbilicated. The whorls are striate or granulate. The anal fasciole is submedian or below the middle. The slit is short.

== Species ==
=== Extant ===
According to the World Register of Marine Species (WoRMS), the following species with valid names are included within the genus Perotrochus:

- † Perotrochus allani Marwick, 1928
- Perotrochus amabilis (Bayer, 1963)
- Perotrochus anseeuwi Kanazawa & Goto, 1991
- Perotrochus atlanticus Rios & Matthews, 1968
- Perotrochus caledonicus Bouchet & Métivier, 1982
- Perotrochus charlestonensis Askew, 1987
- Perotrochus deforgesi Métivier, 1990
- Perotrochus lucaya Bayer, 1965
- † Perotrochus maoriensis (Wilckens, 1922)
- † Perotrochus marwicki C. A. Fleming, 1970
- Perotrochus maureri Harasewych & Askew, 1993
- Perotrochus metivieri Anseeuw & Goto, 1995
- Perotrochus oishii (Shikama, 1973)
- Perotrochus pseudogranulosus Anseeuw, Puillandre, Utge & Bouchet, 2015
- Perotrochus quoyanus (Fischer & Bernardi, 1856)
- Perotrochus sunderlandorum Petuch & Berschauer, 2017
- Perotrochus tosatoi Anseeuw, Goto & Abdi, 2005
- Perotrochus vicdani Kosuge, 1980
- Perotrochus wareni Anseeuw, Puillandre, Utge & Bouchet, 2015

Species brought into synonymy

- Perotrochus africanus (Tomlin, 1948): synonym of Bayerotrochus africanus (Tomlin, 1948)
- Perotrochus boucheti Anseeuw & Poppe, 2001: synonym of Bayerotrochus boucheti (Anseeuw & Poppe, 2001)
- Perotrochus diliculum Okutani, 1979: synonym of Bayerotrochus diluculum (Okutani, 1979)
- Perotrochus gemma F. M. Bayer, 1965: synonym of Perotrochus quoyanus quoyanus (P. Fischer & Bernardi, 1856)
- Perotrochus gotoi Anseeuw, 1990: synonym of Mikadotrochus gotoi (Anseeuw, 1990)
- Perotrochus hirasei (Pilsbry, 1903): synonym of Mikadotrochus hirasei (Pilsbry, 1903)
- Perotrochus indicus Anseeuw, 1999: synonym of Bayerotrochus indicus (Anseeuw, 1999)
- † Perotrochus masoni P. A. Maxwell, 1978: synonym of † Bayerotrochus masoni (P. A. Maxwell, 1978)
- Perotrochus midas Bayer, 1965: synonym of Bayerotrochus midas (Bayer, 1965)
- Perotrochus poppei Anseeuw, 2003: synonym of Bayerotrochus poppei Anseeuw, 2003
- Perotrochus pyramus Bayer, 1967: synonym of Bayerotrochus pyramus (Bayer, 1967)
- Perotrochus tangaroanus Bouchet & Métivier, 1982: synonym of Bayerotrochus tangaroanus (Bouchet & Métivier, 1982)
- Perotrochus teramachii Kuroda, 1955: synonym of Bayerotrochus teramachii (Kuroda, 1955)
- Perotrochus westralis (Whitehead, 1987): synonym of Bayerotrochus westralis (Whitehead, 1987)

=== Fossil ===
- †P. allani, Red Bluff Tuff, New Zealand
- †P. brachoi, Otekaike Limestone, New Zealand
- †P. eocenicus, Kattachi Formation, Japan
- †P. isseli Roverato 1900, Sassello (SV), Tertiary Piedmont Basin, Italy
- †P. masoni Maxwell 1978, Otekaike Limestone, New Zealand (synonym of † Bayerotrochus masoni (P. A. Maxwell, 1978))
- †P. sismondai, Alzey Formation, Germany
- †P. (Perotrochus) hanoverensis, Castle Hayne Formation, North Carolina
- †P. (Entemnotrochus), Capay Formation, California and Swan Cay Formation, Panama
- †Pleurotomaria (Entemnotrochus) baldwini, P. (E.) schencki & P. (E.) siletzensis, Siletz River Volcanics, Oregon
