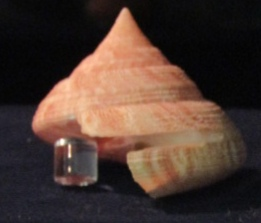
- Perotrochus maureri in Endo Shell Museum

Scientific classification
- Kingdom: Animalia
- Phylum: Mollusca
- Class: Gastropoda
- Subclass: Vetigastropoda
- Order: Pleurotomariida
- Superfamily: Pleurotomarioidea
- Family: Pleurotomariidae
- Genus: Perotrochus
- Species: P. maureri

Binomial name
- Perotrochus maureri Harasewych & Askew, 1993

Synonyms
- Perotrochus amabilis auct. non Bayer, 1963

= Perotrochus maureri =

Species of gastropod

Perotrochus maureri common name "Maurer's Slit Shell", is a species of large sea snail, a marine gastropod mollusk in the family Pleurotomariidae, the slit snails.

== Description ==
=== External Shell and Structure ===
The length of the shell varies between 35mm and 60mm, consisting of ≤9¾ whorls total. The whorls display both spiral lirae and axial riblets, the latter of which decrease in prominence, gradually becoming reduced to beads on the spiral lirae. The shell of P. maureri is originally described as non-umbilicate.The spire of the shell is described as high, coeloconoid (concave towards the protoconch), and mostly straight for the first five whorls. The protoconch consists of one glossy whorl that is transparent and nearly invisible to the human eye, as it is 0.005cm wide. The shell has an oval shaped, pearlescent aperture with a thin lip and denticle. P. maureri has a base color of ivory with orange-rust colored axial bands that are interspersed with thinner, lighter orange, paler axial bands. The shell has a small operculum relative to the size of the aperture. Specimens of the shell often bear predation scars from crustaceans.

=== Live Snail ===
The live snail has long cylindrical tentacles that, along with the foot and head, are noted to be dark red. The snail has interconnected mouth parts consisting of the jaws, inner lips, and outer lips. P. maureri has a hypobranchial gland that secretes whitish fluid that adheres to the shell when the snail is disturbed. The snail, like other carnivorous species, has a toothed radula used to acquire prey.

== Distribution and Habitat ==
This species occurs in, and is endemic to, the Atlantic Ocean off South Carolina and in the Gulf of Mexico off East Florida. It is found in depths of 193-400 meters below the surface. P. maureri is a benthic snail that resides on underwater hill crests and valleys with a base of hard substrates.

== Life Habits ==
=== Diet ===
P. maureri is carnivorous sessile prey feeder and its diet consists of sea sponges. Specifically in the orders Poecilosclerida, Tetractinellida, Spirophorida (suborder) or genus Strongylophora (order Callyspongia).

=== Reproduction ===
This species reproduces sexually.

=== Locomotion ===
P. maureri moves by mucus mediated gliding.

=== Predation and Defense ===
It is suspected, based on the presence of predation scars found on shell specimens, that P. maureri is primarily predated by crustaceans. The fluid secreted from the hypobranchial gland is thought to be a chemical defense that may be used to repel predators, as is seen in other species in the family Pleurotomariidae.
