= Perotrochus metivieri =

Scientific classification
- Kingdom: Animalia
- Phylum: Mollusca
- Class: Gastropoda
- Subclass: Vetigastropoda
- Order: Pleurotomariida
- Superfamily: Pleurotomarioidea
- Family: Pleurotomariidae
- Genus: Perotrochus
- Species: P. metivieri

Binomial name
- Perotrochus metivieri Anseeuw & Goto, 1995

Species of gastropod

Perotrochus metivieri is a species of large sea snail, a marine gastropod mollusk in the family Pleurotomariidae, the slit snails.

== Description ==
The shell grows to a length of 65 mm.

== Distribution ==
This species occurs in the South China Sea.
