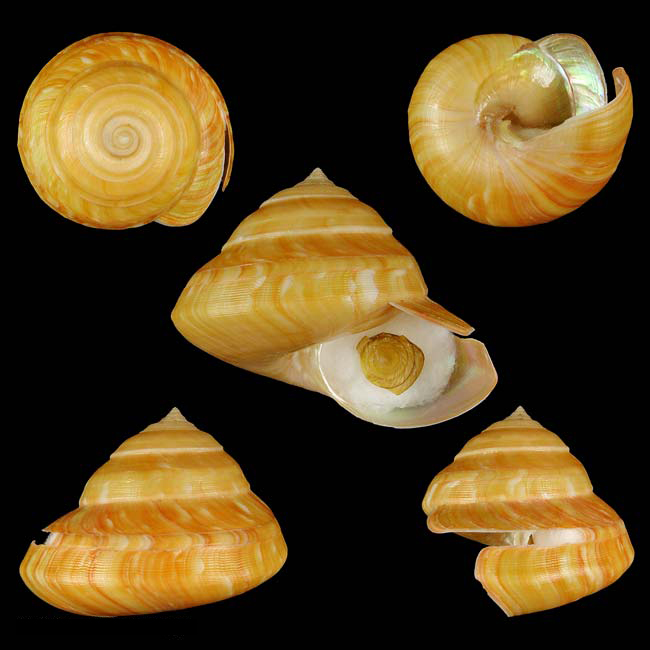

Scientific classification
- Kingdom: Animalia
- Phylum: Mollusca
- Class: Gastropoda
- Subclass: Vetigastropoda
- Order: Pleurotomariida
- Family: Pleurotomariidae
- Genus: Bayerotrochus
- Species: B. philpoppei

Binomial name
- Bayerotrochus philpoppei Anseeuw, Poppe & Goto, 2006

= Bayerotrochus philpoppei =

Species of mollusc

Bayerotrochus philpoppei is a species of sea snail, a marine gastropod mollusc in the family Pleurotomariidae.

== Description ==
Bayerotrochus philpoppei is characterized by having a spiral and conical shape, having a glossy golden look on the outside, given by its sheen, however the coloration can sometimes be a pale white color in certain specimens. The species is found in underwater substrate around 250 to 400 meters deep and is theorized to be carnivorous, preying on deep sea sea sponges.

The length of the shell reaches 56mm, but is reported to reaching up to 88mm in larger specimens.

== Distribution ==
This marine species occurs off the coast of Balut Island, Philippines.
