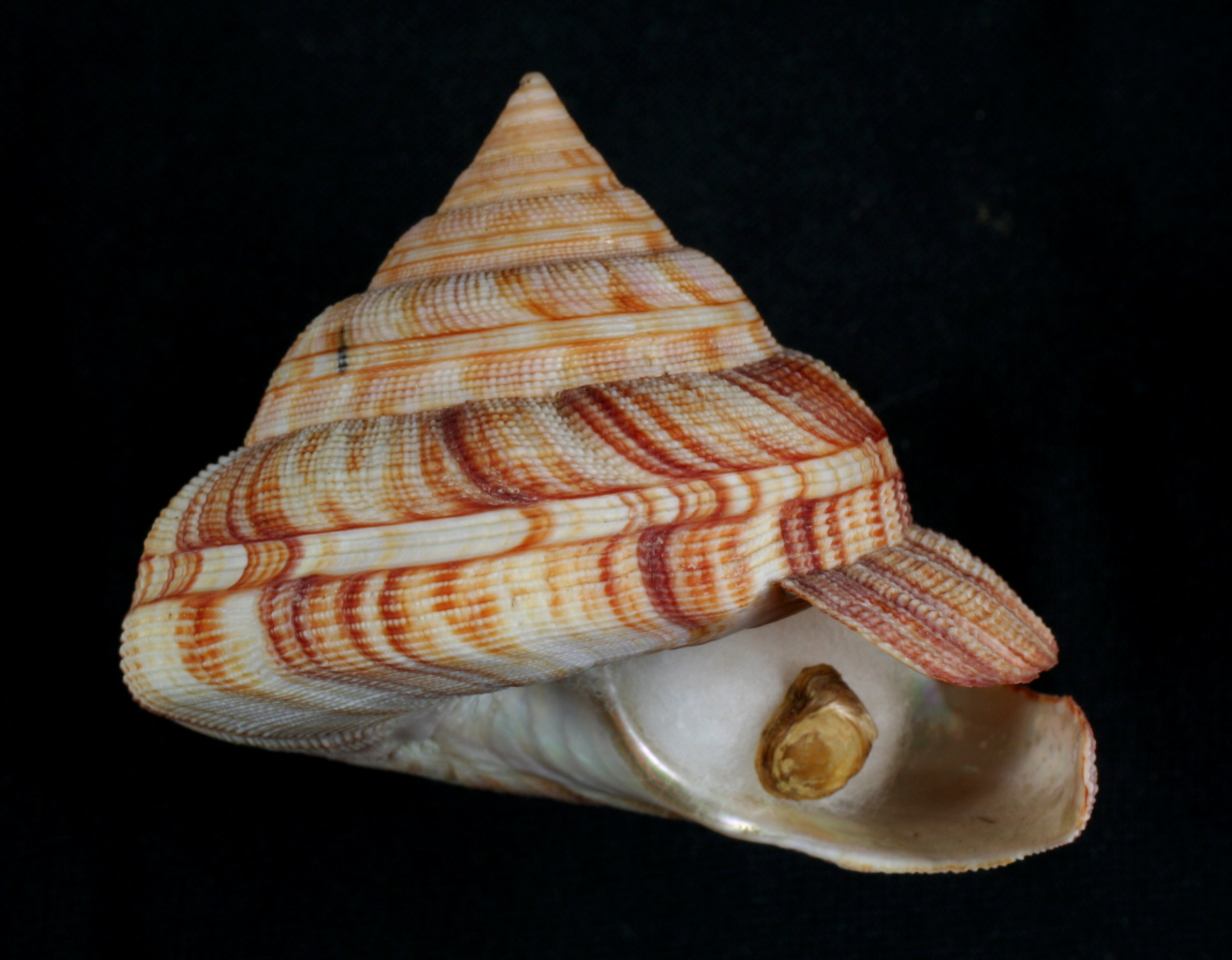
- Shell of Perotrochus atlanticus Rios & Matthews, 1968, with operculum, measuring 50.7 mm height by 60.6 mm diameter, collected in lobster traps at 120 m off Guarapari, in Brazil.

Scientific classification
- Kingdom: Animalia
- Phylum: Mollusca
- Class: Gastropoda
- Subclass: Vetigastropoda
- Order: Pleurotomariida
- Family: Pleurotomariidae
- Genus: Perotrochus
- Species: P. atlanticus

Binomial name
- Perotrochus atlanticus Rios & Matthews, 1968

Synonyms
- Mikadotrochus atlanticus Rios & Matthews, 1968; Mikadotrochus notialis Leme & Penna, 1969; Pleurotomaria atlanticus Rios & Matthews, 1968; Pleurotomaria notialis Leme & Penna, 1969

= Perotrochus atlanticus =

Species of gastropod

Perotrochus atlanticus is a species of sea snail, a marine gastropod mollusk in the family Pleurotomariidae.

== Description ==
The shell has a typical trochoid shape with a spire angle of approximately 80 degrees and nearly smooth sided until the later whorls which are clearly gradated with a clearly defined suture. The base is flat with an angular periphery and a well defined columellar callus at the center covering roughly 40 percent of the base area. The aperture is oval, the slit is positioned roughly halfway between the periphery and the suture and is long, about 20 percent of the circumference.

The shell is heavily textured with about 20 to 22 coarse spiral cords crossed by numerous heavy axial growth lines to produce rows of prominent beads over the entire surface above the selenizone (the area where the shell growth filled in the slit) and about 7 to 8 rows of prominent beads below. The base has 29 to 35 spiral ribs which are finely beaded. The protoconch and primary whorls are white and the rest of the shell is creamy overlaid with numerous irregular brown to purple-red axial flammules, the base is creamy with lighter brown to purple-red flammules, and the interior of the aperture is nacreous. The shell is regularly found without a periostracum. The operculum is small, roughly circular, dark brown, multispiral, and chitinous. Size range: 46 to 88 mm diameter.

== Distribution ==
This species is found at depths of 130 to 280 meters on sand or mud bottoms from southern Brazil south to the border of Uruguay.
