= Bayerotrochus quiquandoni =

Scientific classification
- Kingdom: Animalia
- Phylum: Mollusca
- Class: Gastropoda
- Subclass: Vetigastropoda
- Order: Pleurotomariida
- Superfamily: Pleurotomarioidea
- Family: Pleurotomariidae
- Genus: Bayerotrochus
- Species: B. quiquandoni

Binomial name
- Bayerotrochus quiquandoni Cossignani, 2018

Species of gastropod

Bayerotrochus quiquandoni is a species of sea snail, a marine gastropod mollusk in the family Pleurotomariidae.
