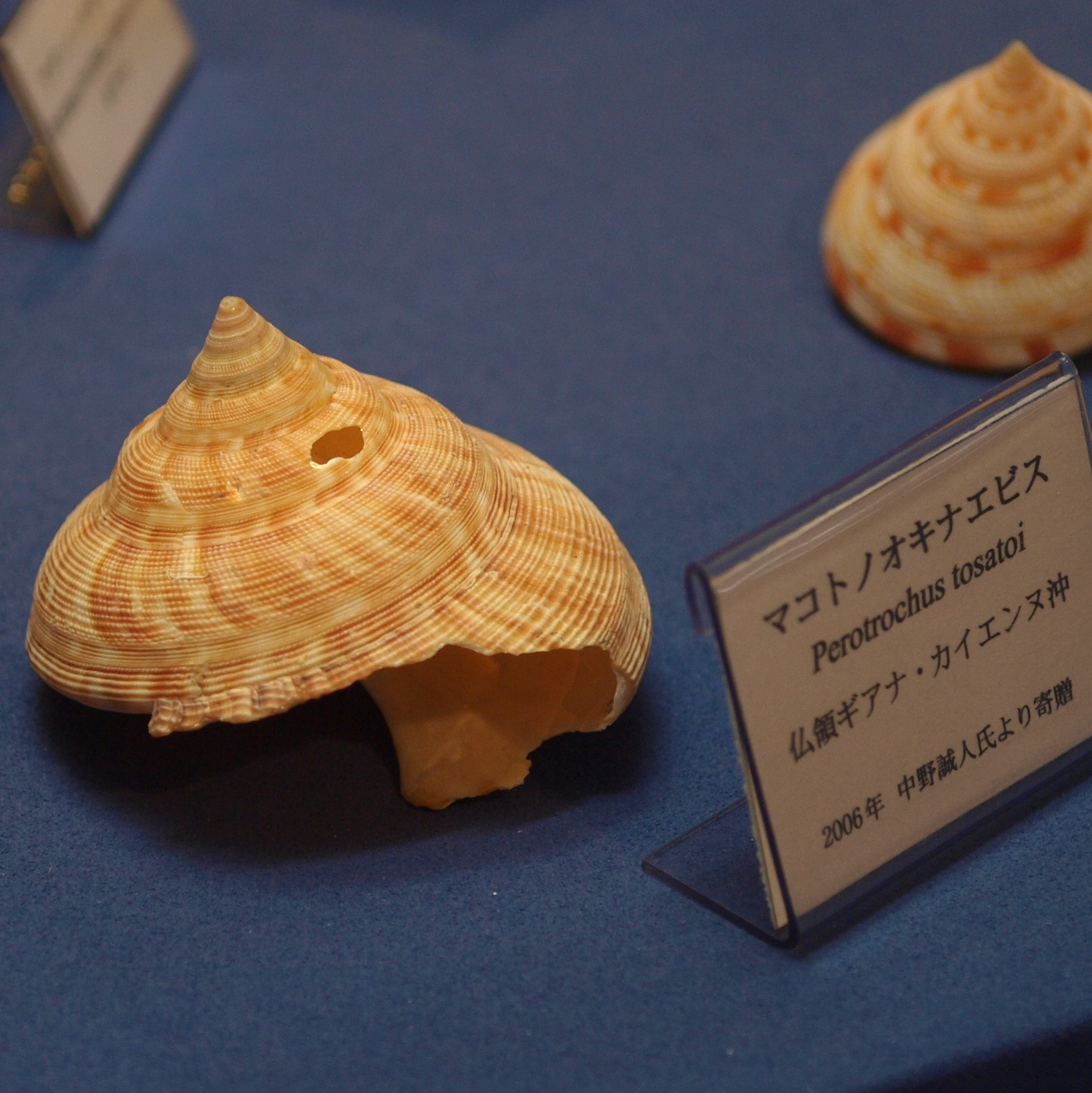

Scientific classification
- Kingdom: Animalia
- Phylum: Mollusca
- Class: Gastropoda
- Subclass: Vetigastropoda
- Order: Pleurotomariida
- Family: Pleurotomariidae
- Genus: Perotrochus
- Species: P. tosatoi

Binomial name
- Perotrochus tosatoi Anseeuw, Goto & Abdi, 2005

= Perotrochus tosatoi =

Species of gastropod

Perotrochus tosatoi is a species of sea snail, a marine gastropod mollusk in the family Pleurotomariidae.

== Description ==
The length of the shell varies between 75 mm and 90 mm. The surface is covered in spiral striations with very fine lines following the overall spiral shape. Their color ranges from reds to creamy yellows, and all shades in between, with darker brown segments. The interior of the aperture, inner lip, and umbilicus are coated with nacre.

== Distribution ==
This marine species occurs in deep waters within the Western Atlantic Ocean, northeast from South America. The holotype specimen originates off the coast of French Guiana.
