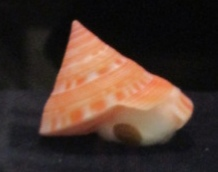
- Mikadotrochus anseeuwi in Endo Shell Museum

Scientific classification
- Kingdom: Animalia
- Phylum: Mollusca
- Class: Gastropoda
- Subclass: Vetigastropoda
- Order: Pleurotomariida
- Superfamily: Pleurotomarioidea
- Family: Pleurotomariidae
- Genus: Perotrochus
- Species: P. anseeuwi

Binomial name
- Perotrochus anseeuwi Kanazawa & Goto, 1991

Synonyms
- Mikadotrochus anseeuwi Kanazawa & Y. Goto, 1991

= Perotrochus anseeuwi =

Species of gastropod

Perotrochus anseeuwi is a species of large sea snail, a marine gastropod mollusk in the family Pleurotomariidae, the slit snails.

== Description ==
The length of the shell ranges between 30 and 90 mm (1.2 and 3.5 in).

== Distribution ==
This marine species occurs off the Philippines.
