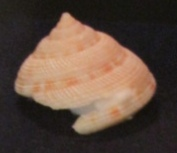
- Perotrochus deforgesi in Endo Shell Museum

Scientific classification
- Kingdom: Animalia
- Phylum: Mollusca
- Class: Gastropoda
- Subclass: Vetigastropoda
- Order: Pleurotomariida
- Superfamily: Pleurotomarioidea
- Family: Pleurotomariidae
- Genus: Perotrochus
- Species: P. deforgesi

Binomial name
- Perotrochus deforgesi Métivier, 1990

Synonyms
- Mikadotrochus deforgesi Métivier, 1990

= Perotrochus deforgesi =

Species of gastropod

Perotrochus deforgesi is a species of large sea snail, a marine gastropod mollusk in the family Pleurotomariidae, the slit snails.

== Description ==
The length of the shell varies between 20 mm and 45 mm. It is also known as the de Forges "split shell". It is a spongivorous grazer often found among sponges. The shell has beaded spiral cords of a depressed shell. It was named after Dr. Bertrand Richer de Forges, organizer of the research dredgings that led to its discovery.

== Distribution ==
This species occurs on the continental slope at depths between 350 m and 580 m in the Chesterfield-Bellona Plateau of New Caledonia in the Coral Sea.
