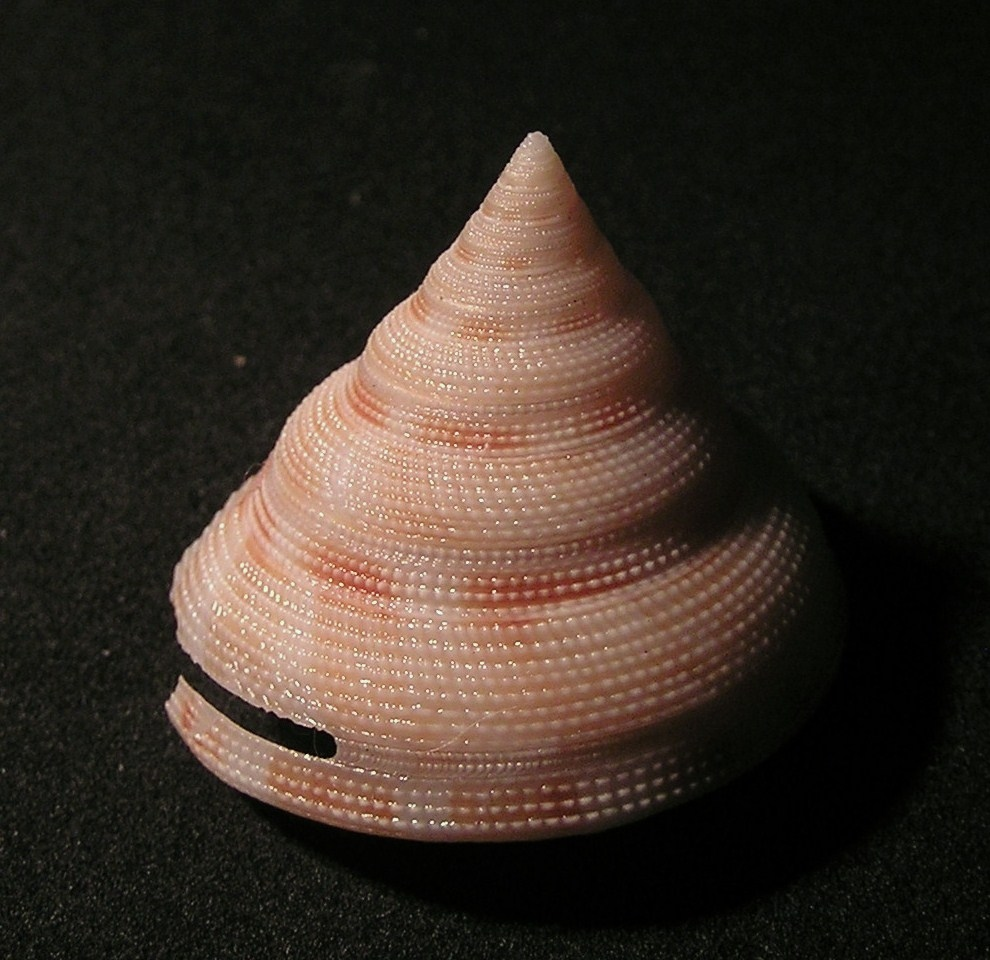
- Shell of Perotrochus caledonicus

Scientific classification
- Kingdom: Animalia
- Phylum: Mollusca
- Class: Gastropoda
- Subclass: Vetigastropoda
- Order: Pleurotomariida
- Superfamily: Pleurotomarioidea
- Family: Pleurotomariidae
- Genus: Perotrochus
- Species: P. caledonicus

Binomial name
- Perotrochus caledonicus (Bouchet & Métivier, 1982)

Synonyms
- Perotrochus caledonicus Bouchet & Metivier, 1982

= Perotrochus caledonicus =

Species of gastropod

Perotrochus caledonicus is a species of large sea snail, a marine gastropod mollusk in the family Pleurotomariidae, the slit snails.

== Description ==
The length of the shell varies between 30 mm and 55 mm.

The type material that Perotrochus caledonicus is made of, from southern New Caledonia, typically has a smooth shell, but a more pustulose variation was later found and initially considered just a form of the same species. Collectors and dealers continue to distinguish between the "smooth" and "pustulose" forms, with some suggesting the latter might even qualify as a separate species.

== Distribution ==
This marine species occurs off New Caledonia.
