= Perotrochus lucaya =

Scientific classification
- Kingdom: Animalia
- Phylum: Mollusca
- Class: Gastropoda
- Subclass: Vetigastropoda
- Order: Pleurotomariida
- Superfamily: Pleurotomarioidea
- Family: Pleurotomariidae
- Genus: Perotrochus
- Species: P. lucaya

Binomial name
- Perotrochus lucaya Bayer, 1965

Species of gastropod

Perotrochus lucaya, common name the Lucayan slit shell, is a species of large sea snail, a marine gastropod mollusk in the family Pleurotomariidae, the slit snails.

== Description ==
The length of the shell varies between 25 mm and 60 mm.

The Lucayan slit shell feeds on sessile prey.

== Distribution ==
This species occurs in the Caribbean Sea off Venezuela and in the Atlantic Ocean off the Bahamas at depths between 275 m and 427 m.
