= Perotrochus amabilis =

- Perotrochus amabilis in Endo Shell Museum

Scientific classification
- Kingdom: Animalia
- Phylum: Mollusca
- Class: Gastropoda
- Subclass: Vetigastropoda
- Order: Pleurotomariida
- Family: Pleurotomariidae
- Genus: Perotrochus
- Species: P. amabilis

Binomial name
- Perotrochus amabilis (Bayer, 1963)

Synonyms
- Mikadotrochus amabilis Bayer, 1963 (original combination); Pleurotomaria amabilis (Bayer, 1963)

Species of gastropod

Perotrochus amabilis, common name the lovely slit shell, is a species of sea snail, a marine gastropod mollusk in the family Pleurotomariidae.

== Description ==
The length of the shell varies between 50 mm and 93 mm.

== Distribution ==
This marine species occurs in the Gulf of Mexico, the Caribbean Sea; in the Atlantic Ocean from Florida to Brazil.
