= Perotrochus vicdani =

Scientific classification
- Kingdom: Animalia
- Phylum: Mollusca
- Class: Gastropoda
- Subclass: Vetigastropoda
- Order: Pleurotomariida
- Superfamily: Pleurotomarioidea
- Family: Pleurotomariidae
- Genus: Perotrochus
- Species: P. vicdani

Binomial name
- Perotrochus vicdani Kosuge, 1980

Species of gastropod

Perotrochus vicdani is a species of large sea snail, a marine gastropod mollusk in the family Pleurotomariidae, the slit snails.

== Description ==
The length of the shell varies between 35 mm and 75 mm.

== Distribution ==
This marine species occurs of the Philippines and Vietnam.
