= Thelyssa =

Scientific classification
- Kingdom: Animalia
- Phylum: Mollusca
- Class: Gastropoda
- Subclass: Vetigastropoda
- Superfamily: Seguenzioidea
- Family: Seguenziidae
- Subfamily: Seguenziinae
- Genus: Thelyssa; Bayer, 1971

Genus of gastropods

Thelyssa is a genus of extremely small deep water sea snails, marine gastropod mollusks in the family Seguenziidae.

== Species ==
Species within the genus Thelyssa include:

- Thelyssa callisto Bayer, 1971
