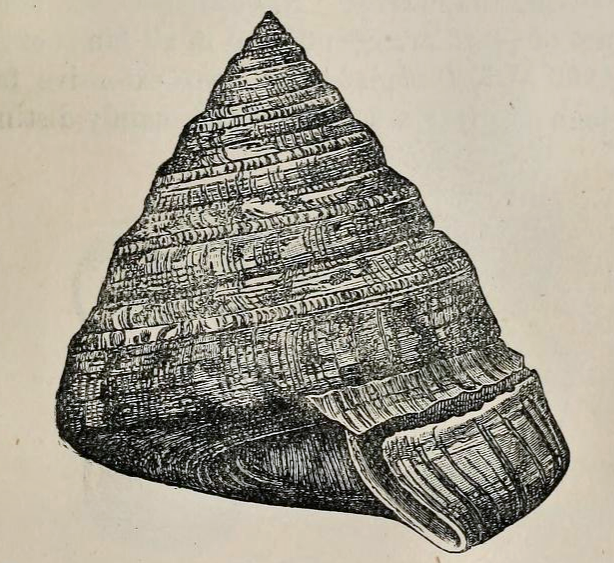
- Drawing of a shell of Entemnotrochus adansonianus

Scientific classification
- Kingdom: Animalia
- Phylum: Mollusca
- Class: Gastropoda
- Subclass: Vetigastropoda
- Order: Pleurotomariida
- Family: Pleurotomariidae
- Genus: Entemnotrochus
- Species: E. adansonianus

Binomial name
- Entemnotrochus adansonianus (Crosse & Fischer, 1861)

Synonyms
- Pleurotomaria adansoniana Crosse & Fischer, 1861

= Entemnotrochus adansonianus =

Species of gastropod

Entemnotrochus adansonianus, common name Adanson's slit shell, is a species of sea snail, a marine gastropod mollusk in the family Pleurotomariidae.

Subspecies

- Entemnotrochus adansonianus adansonianus (Crosse & Fischer, 1861)
- Entemnotrochus adansonianus bermudensis Okutani & Goto, 1983

== Description ==
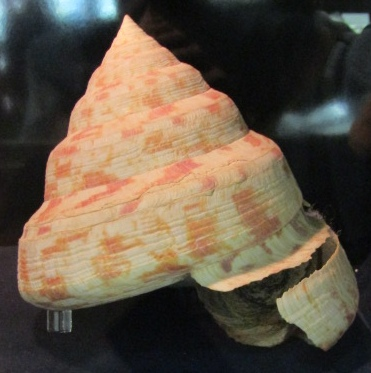
Shell in Endo Shell Museum

The length of the shell varies between 80 mm and 190 mm. This attractive species has a pale yellowish-fleshy color with numerous, irregular, reddish spots, sometimes vivid, sometimes more or less effaced. The shell has a trochiform shape above, but is plano-convex beneath and concave in the middle. It is concentrically costate-sulcate with granulose ribs. It has many longitudinal wrinkles. The acuminate apex is smooth and yellowish. The 11 whorls increase slowly and are rather planulate at the sutures. The shell is unequally divided by the slit fasciole. Below it is traversed by 7 to 8 spiral granose ribs, above it with longitudinal, oblique, rather separated striae and two spiral, slightly marked series of granules; The body whorl is obtusely bicarinate. The slit fascicle has a semicircular, delicate, impressed stride. It has a round and very deep, pervious umbilicus. The species has a (thin yellow in juvenile examples) operculum that completely seals the subquadrate aperture. The shell is pearly within.

== Distribution ==
Entemnotrochus adansonianus is endemic to the West Indies and Caribbean region. A very few of these rare slit shells that reside at depths between 150 and 240 metres have been dredged and (crabbed examples) trapped. This species also occurs on the Mid-Atlantic Ridge.
