= Bayerotrochus charlestonensis =

Scientific classification
- Kingdom: Animalia
- Phylum: Mollusca
- Class: Gastropoda
- Subclass: Vetigastropoda
- Order: Pleurotomariida
- Superfamily: Pleurotomarioidea
- Family: Pleurotomariidae
- Genus: Bayerotrochus
- Species: B. charlestonensis

Binomial name
- Bayerotrochus charlestonensis (Askew, 1987)

Synonyms
- Perotrochus charlestonensis. Askew, 1987

Species of gastropod

Bayerotrochus charlestonensis is a species of large sea snail, a marine gastropod mollusk in the family Pleurotomariidae, the slit snails.

== Description ==
The length of the shell varies between 40 mm and 87 mm.

== Distribution ==
This species occurs in the Atlantic Ocean off South Carolina, USA.
