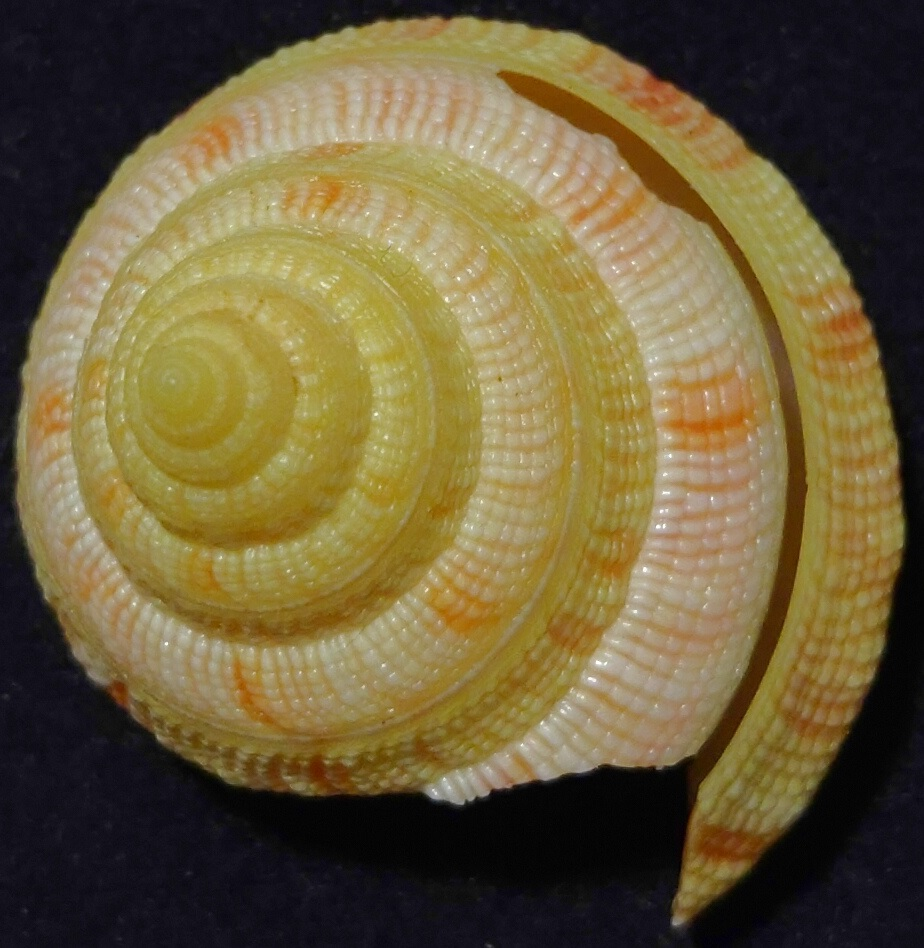
- A shell of Entemnotrochus rumphii

Scientific classification
- Kingdom: Animalia
- Phylum: Mollusca
- Class: Gastropoda
- Subclass: Vetigastropoda
- Order: Pleurotomariida
- Family: Pleurotomariidae
- Genus: Entemnotrochus
- Species: E. rumphii

Binomial name
- Entemnotrochus rumphii (Schepman, 1879)

Synonyms
- Entemnotrochus urashima Shikama & Oishi in Shikama, 1977; Pleurotomaria rumphii Schepman, 1879 (basionym); Pleurotomaria (Entemnotrochus) rumphii

= Entemnotrochus rumphii =

Species of mollusc

Entemnotrochus rumphii, common name the Rumphius' slit shell, is a species of large sea snail with gills and an operculum, a marine gastropod mollusc in the family Pleurotomariidae, the slit snails.

== Distribution ==
Pacific Ocean: Deep water.

This marine species occurs off Japan, Taiwan and the Philippines.

== Description ==
The width of this large gastropod shell is 130–285 mm. The shell has a broadly conoid shape with a convex base. It is moderately umbilicated, the umbilicus penetrating to the apex. It is a little plicated within by the prominent growth lines. The color is yellowish-white, with flames of orange or carmine red, and light violet, particularly developed on the body whorl. The apex is eroded and yellow. The number of whorls is uncertain, probably between 11 and 13. The whorls are visibly convex and divided into nearly equal portions by the slit fasciole, which is a little above the middle. The sculpture is composed of oblique, radiating striae, more prominent on the upper whorls. The base of the shell is almost smooth, with a slight stride of growth and very fine concentric lines. The nacreous aperture is obliquely quadrangular. The basal margin is continuous with the columella, and is not angulated at its junction with it.
