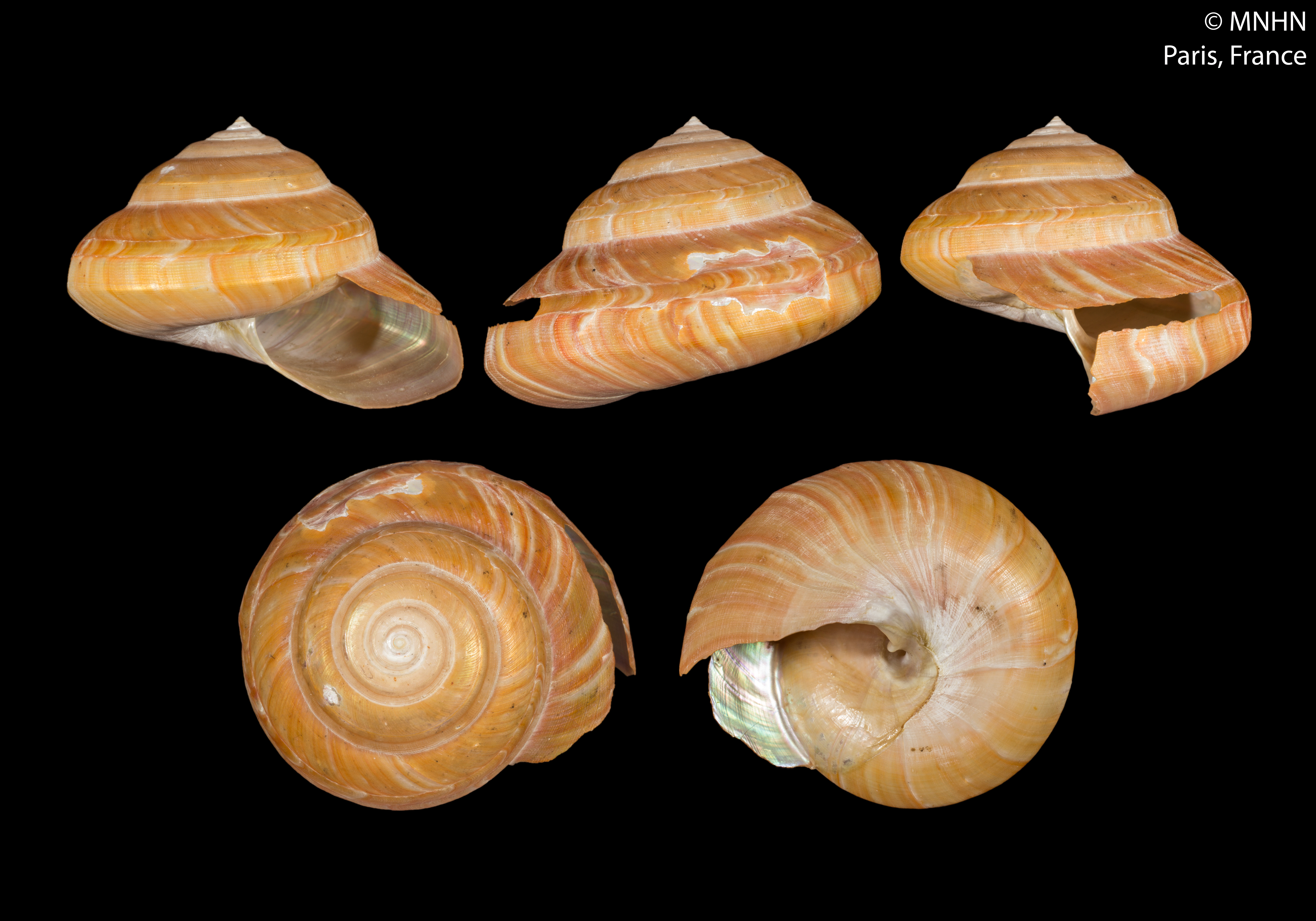

Scientific classification
- Kingdom: Animalia
- Phylum: Mollusca
- Class: Gastropoda
- Subclass: Vetigastropoda
- Order: Pleurotomariida
- Superfamily: Pleurotomarioidea
- Family: Pleurotomariidae
- Genus: Bayerotrochus
- Species: B. indicus

Binomial name
- Bayerotrochus indicus (Anseeuw, 1999)

Synonyms
- Perotrochus indicus Anseeuw, 1999

= Bayerotrochus indicus =

Species of gastropod

Bayerotrochus indicus is a species of large sea snail, a marine gastropod mollusk in the family Pleurotomariidae, the slit snails.

== Description ==
The shell grows to a length of 75 mm.

== Distribution ==
This species occurs in the Andaman Sea.
