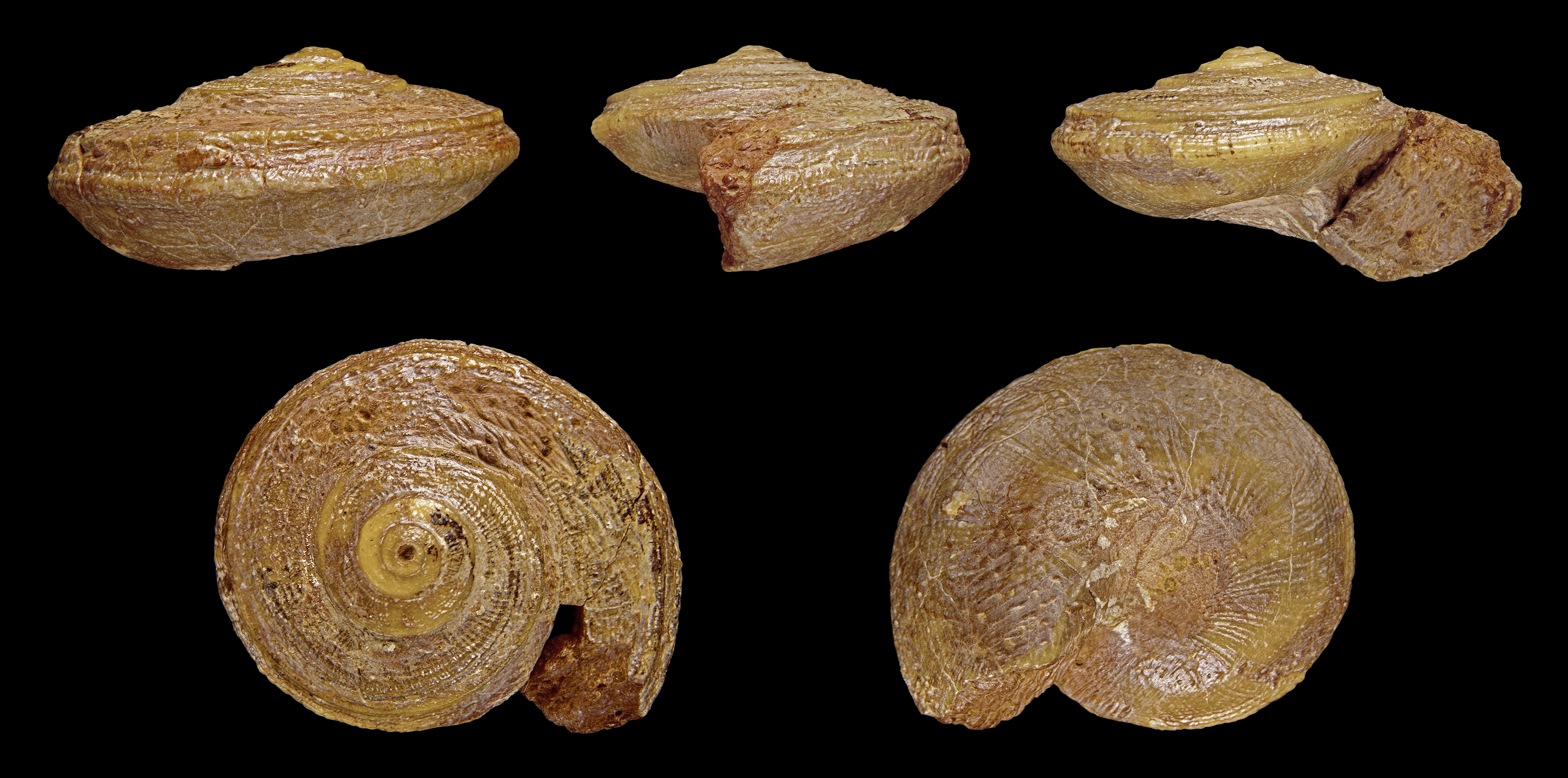
- Five views of a fossil shell of Obornella granulata

Scientific classification
- Kingdom: Animalia
- Phylum: Mollusca
- Class: Gastropoda
- Subclass: Vetigastropoda
- Order: Pleurotomariida
- Family: Pleurotomariidae
- Genus: †Obornella; Cox, 1959

= Obornella =

Genus of gastropods

Obornella is a genus of fossil sea snails, marine gastropod mollusks in the family Pleurotomariidae, the slit snails, (according to the taxonomy of the Gastropoda by Bouchet & Rocroi, 2005).

== Species ==
Species within the genus Obornella include:

- Obornella granulata
- Obornella lakhaparensis
- Orbornella plicopunctata
- Obornella thompsonorum
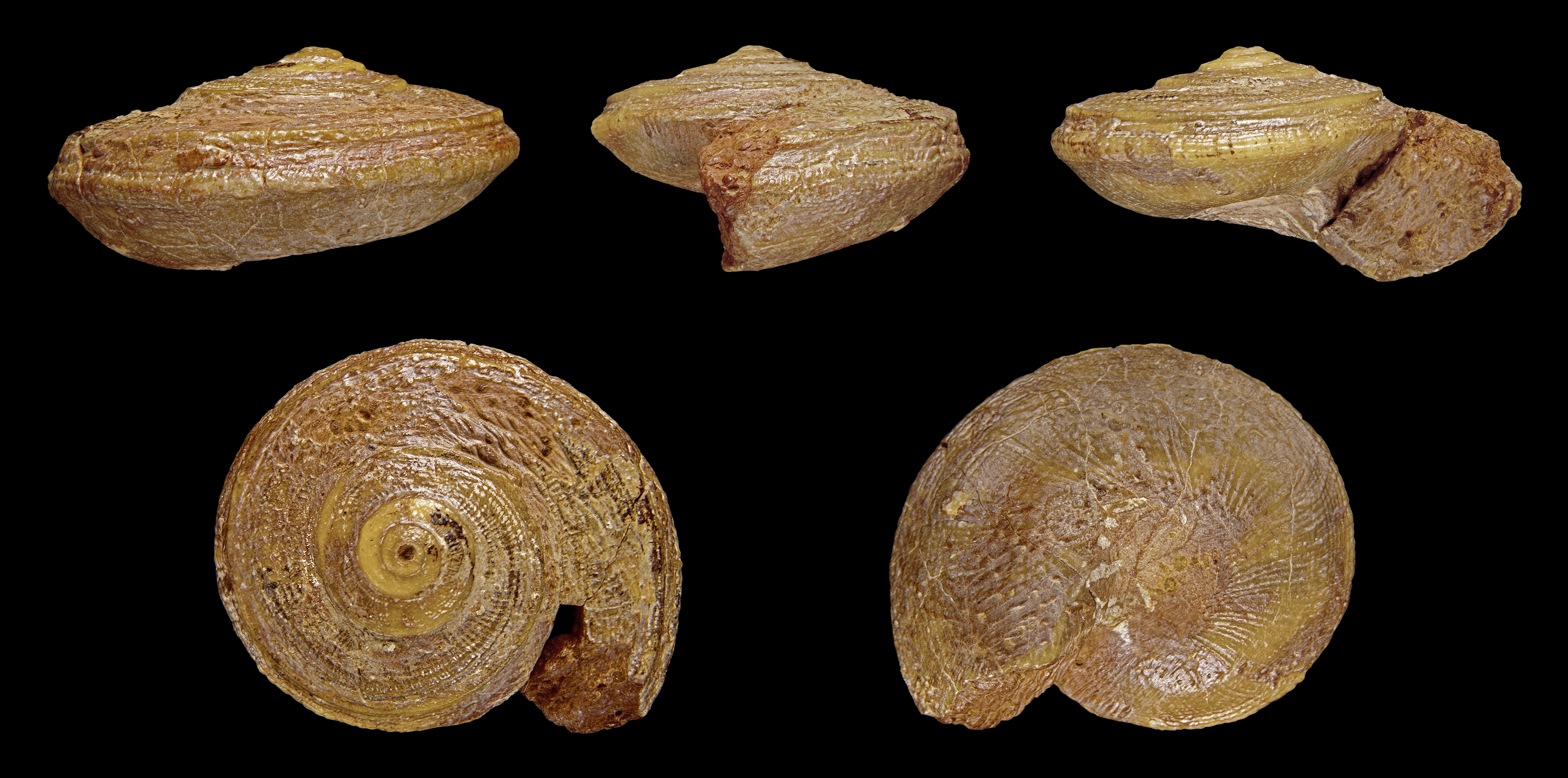
Obornella granulata

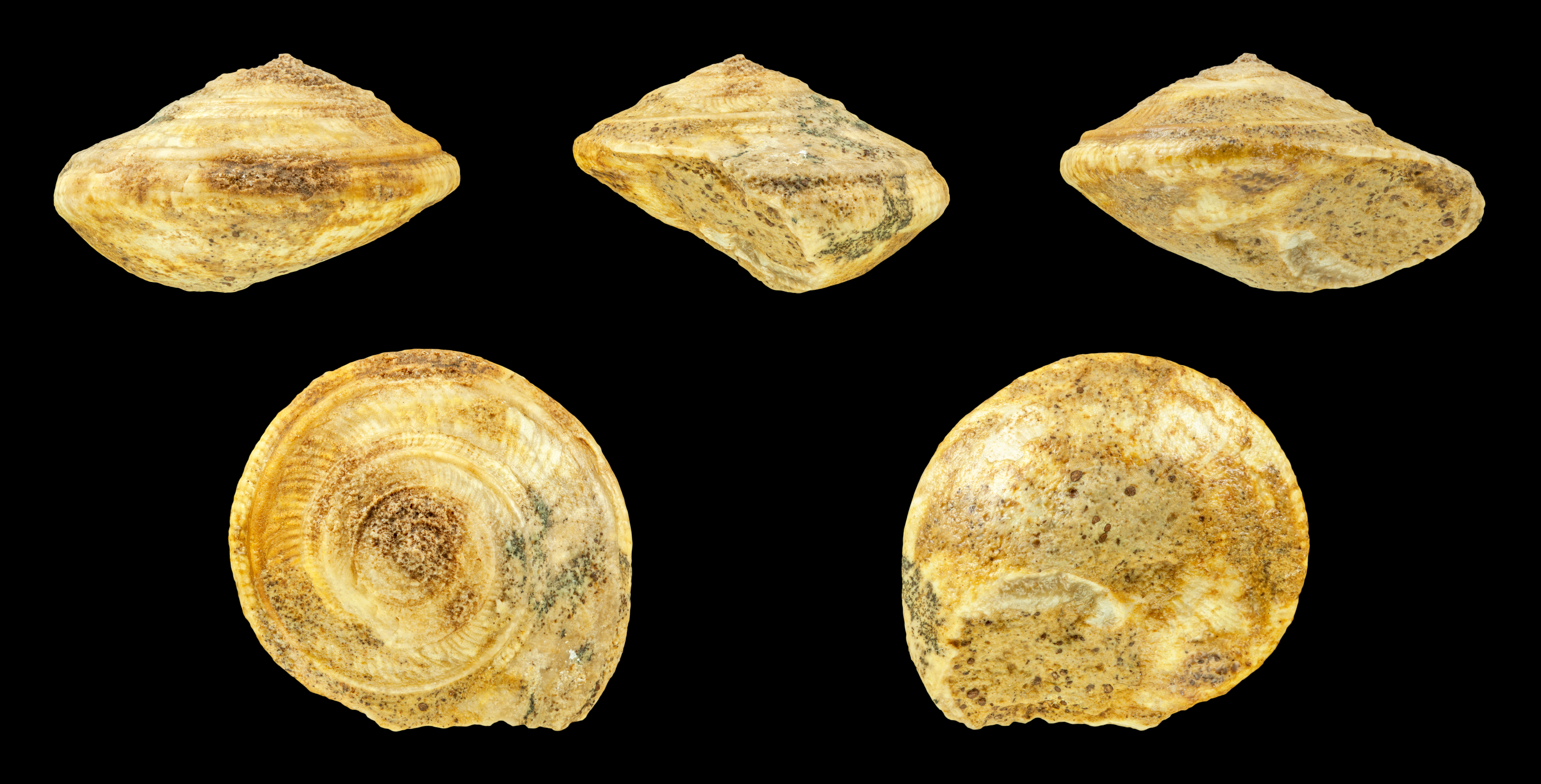
Obornella laevigata
