= Bayerotrochus diluculum =

Scientific classification
- Kingdom: Animalia
- Phylum: Mollusca
- Class: Gastropoda
- Subclass: Vetigastropoda
- Order: Pleurotomariida
- Superfamily: Pleurotomarioidea
- Family: Pleurotomariidae
- Genus: Bayerotrochus
- Species: B. diluculum

Binomial name
- Bayerotrochus diluculum (Okutani, 1979)

Synonyms
- Perotrochus diliculum Okutani, 1979

Species of gastropod

Bayerotrochus diluculum, common name the dawn slit shell, is a species of large sea snail, a marine gastropod mollusk in the family Pleurotomariidae, the slit snails.

== Description, ==
The length of the shell reaches 80 mm.

== Distribution ==
This marine species occurs off central Japan.
