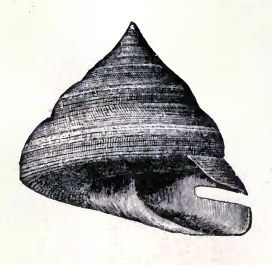
- Drawing with an apertural view of a shell of Perotrochus quoyanus

Scientific classification
- Kingdom: Animalia
- Phylum: Mollusca
- Class: Gastropoda
- Subclass: Vetigastropoda
- Order: Pleurotomariida
- Superfamily: Pleurotomarioidea
- Family: Pleurotomariidae
- Genus: Perotrochus
- Species: P. quoyanus

Binomial name
- Perotrochus quoyanus (Fischer & Bernardi, 1856)

= Perotrochus quoyanus =

Species of gastropod

Perotrochus quoyanus is a species of large sea snail, a marine gastropod mollusk in the family Pleurotomariidae, the slit snails.

Subspecies

- Perotrochus quoyanus insularis Okutani & Goto, 1985 (synonym: Perotrochus insularis Okutani & Goto, 1985 )
- Perotrochus quoyanus quoyanus (P. Fischer & Bernardi, 1856) (synonyms: Pleurotomaria quoyana Fischer & Bernardi, 1856; Perotrochus gemma F. M. Bayer, 1966; Perotrochus coltrorum Rios, 2003)

== Description ==
The shell of Perotrochus quoyanus quoyanus has a trochiform shape. It is obtusely carinated, with the base rounded, flattened and concave but not umbilicated. The spire is turbinate, terminating in an acuminate apex. The nine, granulose whorls are slowly increasing. They are rounded and swollen toward the suture. They are divided into two unequal portions by the slit fasciole. The slit fascicle below the middle is decussated by semicircular and spiral striae. The slit is wide in length, but short in height. The umbilical depression is excavated, nacreous, iridescent, and surrounded by slight concentric grooves. The semioval aperture is nacreous within. The columellar margin is recurved with a nacreous callosity. The nearly sharp outer lip is not reflexed. The color of the shell is pale rose, with obscure dashes or flammules of reddish brown.

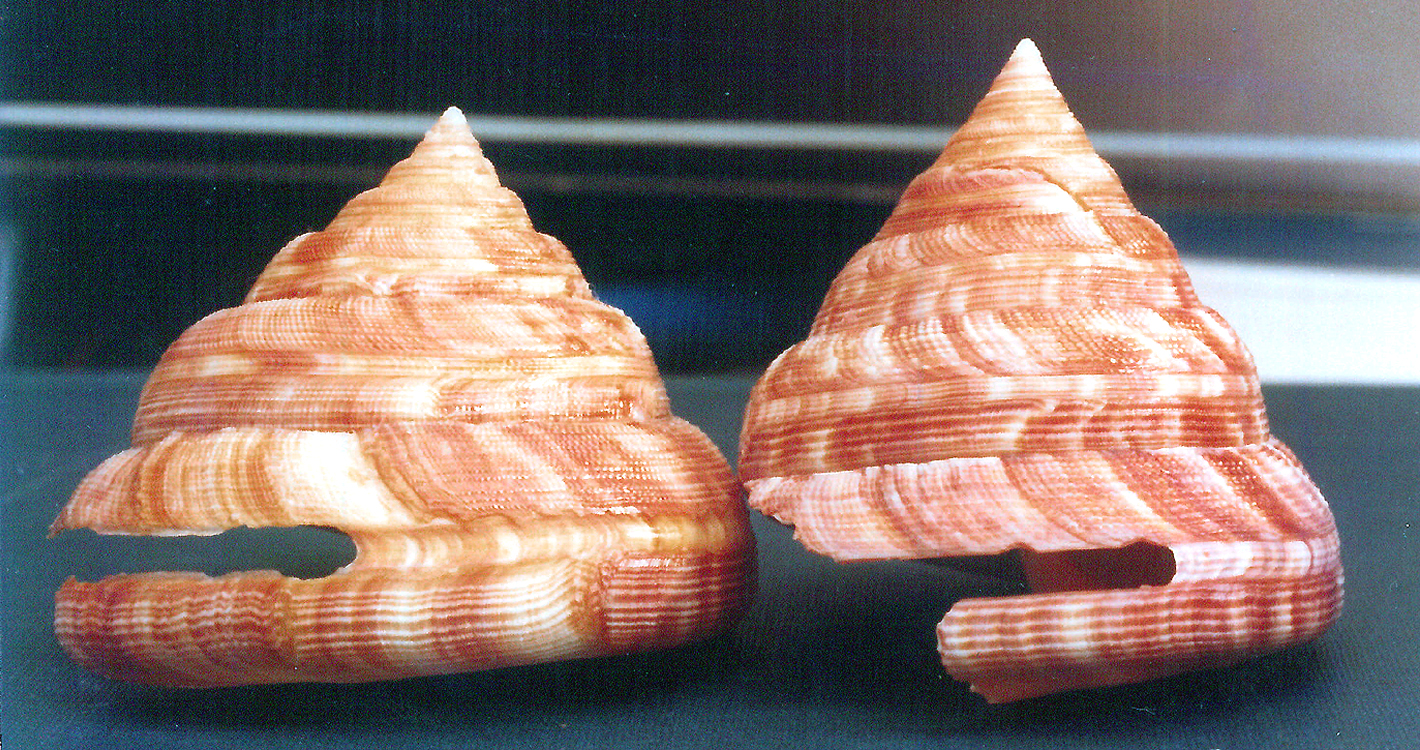
VARIANTS with differing spire shapes but same species.

== Distribution ==
This species occurs in the Caribbean Sea and the Lesser Antilles. Fresh-dead (crabbed) shells have been trapped offshore West coast BARBADOS, at depths around 180–200 metres. Living specimens were recovered in April 1989, via Johnson Sea-Link II submersible, operating from R.V. Seward Johnson of Harbor Branch Oceanographic Institute at greater depths, 2–3 miles offshore West coast Barbados.
