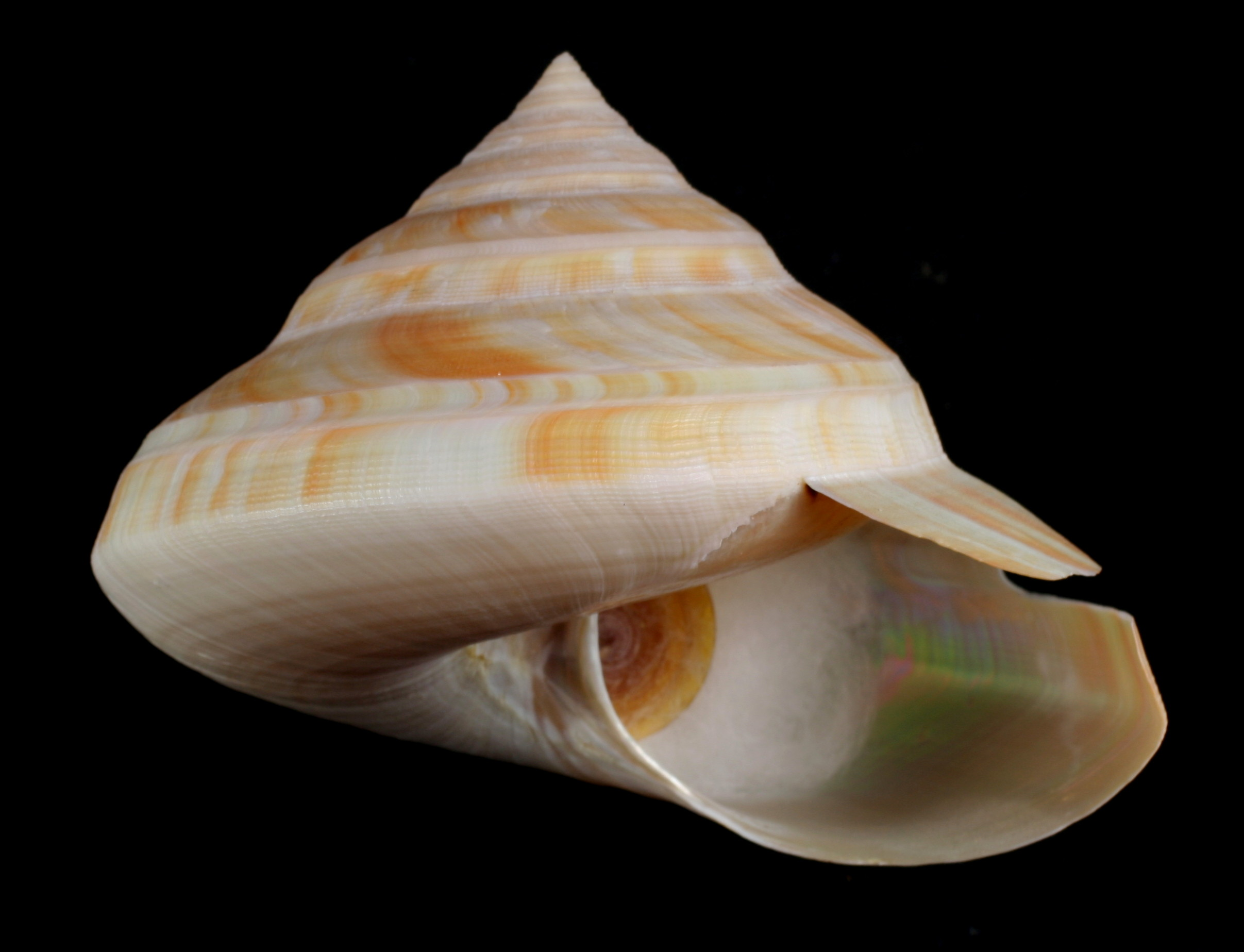
- Shell and operculum of Bayerotrochus westralis (Whitehead, 1987) measuring 67.3 mm height by 84.3 mm diameter, reportedly trawled at 1200 meters off Rowle Shoal, in Western Australia.

Scientific classification
- Kingdom: Animalia
- Phylum: Mollusca
- Class: Gastropoda
- Subclass: Vetigastropoda
- Order: Pleurotomariida
- Family: Pleurotomariidae
- Genus: Bayerotrochus
- Species: B. westralis

Binomial name
- Bayerotrochus westralis (Whitehead, 1987)

Synonyms
- Perotrochus westralis (Whitehead, 1987); Pleurotomaria westralis Whitehead, 1987

= Bayerotrochus westralis =

Species of gastropod

Bayerotrochus westralis, commonly known as "Australia's split shell", is a species of sea snail, a marine gastropod mollusk in the family Pleurotomariidae.

== Description ==
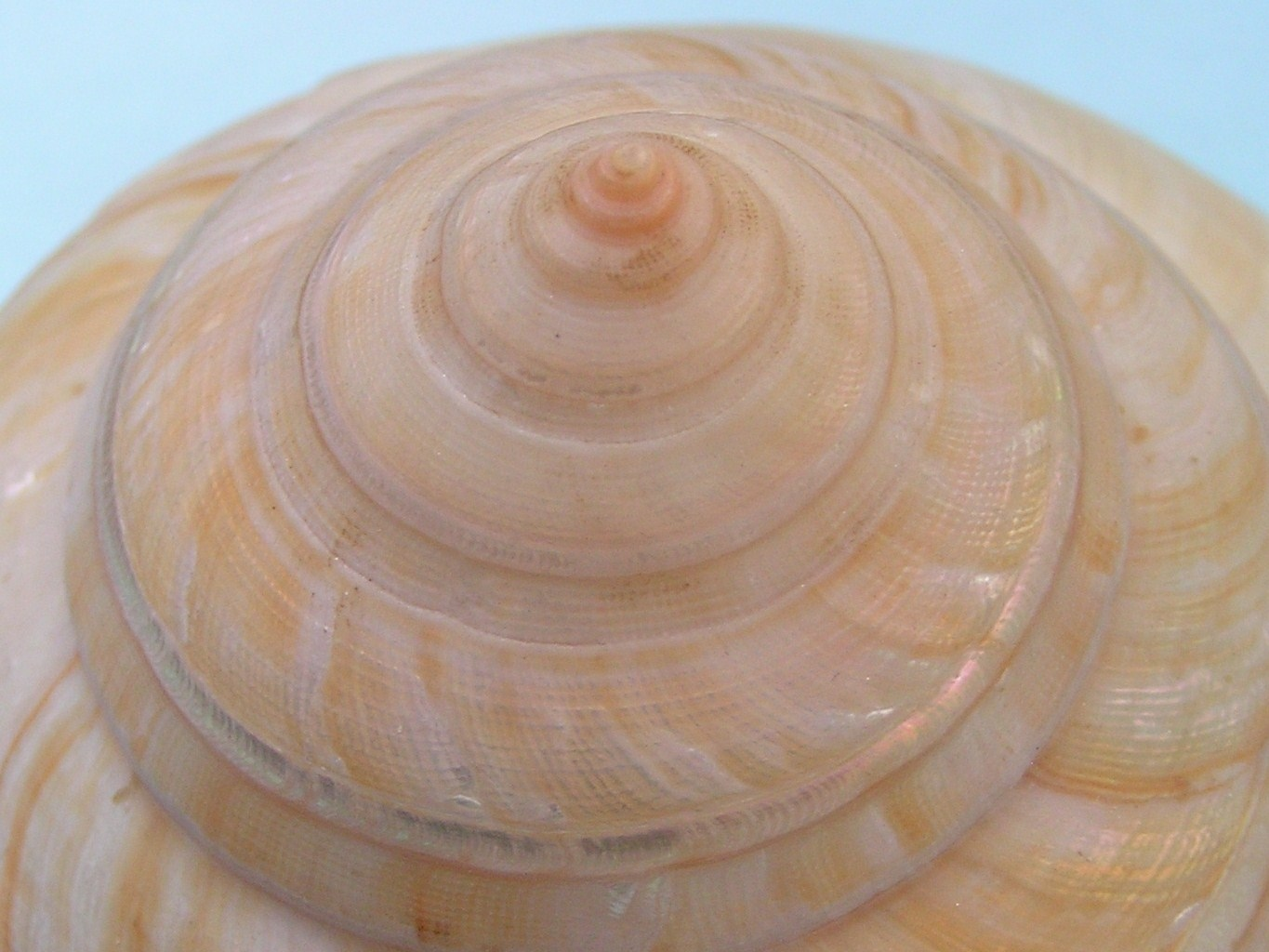
Protoconch of the shell of Bayerotrochus westralis

The shell has a turbinate shape with an apical spire angle of approximately 90 degrees, with inflated body whorls that are proportionate in expansion so that the spire profile is straight, a clearly defined suture, and the periphery is oblique and slightly rounded. The base is highly inflated and lacks a columellar callus at the center of the base area. The aperture is oval, the slit is positioned roughly one third of the way between the upper and lower sutures and is relatively long, about 19 percent of the circumference. The shell is lightly sculptured with very numerous fine spiral cords above and below the selenizone (the area where the shell growth filled in the slit), crossed by very numerous fine axial growth lines. The base has very numerous spiral striae which are crossed by numerous radial growth lines.

The protoconch and primary whorls are white and the main body whorls are a pale buff to white color with an iridescent coppery metallic sheen. Occasionally the teleoconch (body whorls) are overlaid with pale orange or pink axial flammules. The selenizone has no distinct spiral sculpture however it has numerous fine curved growth striae. The base is the same base color as the body, and the interior of the aperture is thinly nacreous (pearly). This species is often found without a periostracum. The operculum is circular, light brown, multispiral, and chitinous. Its size ranges from 44 to 130 mm in diameter.

== Distribution ==
This species has been typically found on soft muddy bottoms between 250 and 500 meters in a small area off Western Australia south of Broome and northwards to the Ashmore Reefs, off southern Japan and in the Central Indo-West Pacific.
