= Thelyssa callisto =

Scientific classification
- Kingdom: Animalia
- Phylum: Mollusca
- Class: Gastropoda
- Subclass: Vetigastropoda
- Superfamily: Seguenzioidea
- Family: Seguenziidae
- Subfamily: Seguenziinae
- Genus: Thelyssa
- Species: T. callisto

Binomial name
- Thelyssa callisto Bayer, 1971

Species of gastropod

Thelyssa callisto is a species of extremely small deep water sea snail, a marine gastropod mollusk in the family Seguenziidae.
