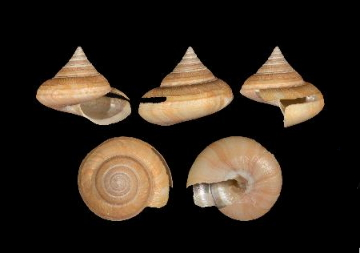
- Shells of Bayerotrochus poppei (holotype at MNHN, Paris)

Scientific classification
- Kingdom: Animalia
- Phylum: Mollusca
- Class: Gastropoda
- Subclass: Vetigastropoda
- Order: Pleurotomariida
- Family: Pleurotomariidae
- Genus: Bayerotrochus
- Species: B. poppei

Binomial name
- Bayerotrochus poppei Anseeuw, 2003

Synonyms
- Perotrochus poppei (Anseeuw, 2003)

= Bayerotrochus poppei =

Species of gastropod

Bayerotrochus poppei is a species of sea snail, a marine gastropod mollusc in the family Pleurotomariidae.

== Description ==
The length of the shell reaches 50 mm.

== Distribution ==
This marine species occurs in the Pacific Ocean off Tonga.
