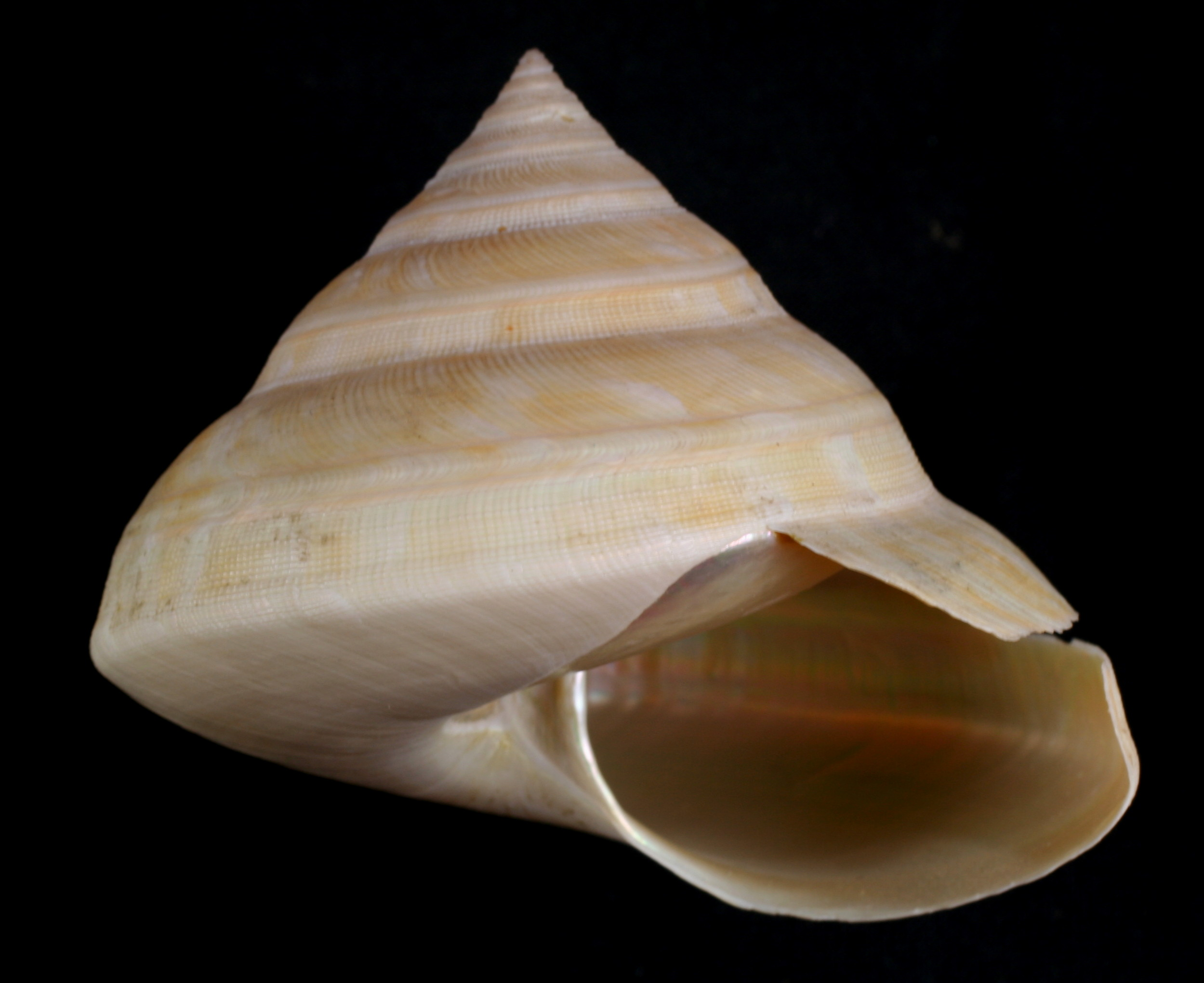
- Shell of Bayerotrochus tangaroanus (Bouchet & Métivier, 1982), measuring 59.2 mm height by 70.6 mm diameter, reportedly trapped at 1500 feet off Western Australia.

Scientific classification
- Kingdom: Animalia
- Phylum: Mollusca
- Class: Gastropoda
- Subclass: Vetigastropoda
- Order: Pleurotomariida
- Family: Pleurotomariidae
- Genus: Bayerotrochus
- Species: B. tangaroanus

Binomial name
- Bayerotrochus tangaroanus (Bouchet & Métivier, 1982)

Synonyms
- Perotrochus tangaroanus Bouchet & Métivier, 1982

= Bayerotrochus tangaroanus =

Species of gastropod

Bayerotrochus tangaroanus, or Tangaroan slit shell, is a species of sea snail, a marine gastropod mollusc in the family Pleurotomariidae.

== Description ==
The shell has a typical trochoid shape with a spire angle of approximately 90 degrees and nearly straight sided profile until the later whorls which are slightly rounded with an oblique periphery and a clearly defined suture. The base is inflated and rounded with a small columellar callus at the center covering roughly 10 percent of the base area. The aperture is oval, the slit is positioned roughly halfway between the periphery and the suture and is relatively short, about 16 percent of the circumference. The shell is lightly sculptured with fine spiral threads which are more clearly defined below the selenizone (the area where the shell growth filled in the slit) crossed by stronger axial growth lines which gives the effect of a weak rectangular pattern. The base has 38 to 40 fine spiral threads.

The protoconch and primary whorls are white and are smooth, the rest of the shell is creamy peach to white, or pale pink, with a slight iridescent sheen and occasional sparse pale reddish axial flammules. Occasionally the selenizone has thin orange lines. The base is the same color as the body, and the interior of the aperture is nacreous (pearly). The shell is regularly found without a periostracum. The operculum is relatively large, roughly circular, pale brown, and multispiral. Its size ranges from 47 to 69 mm in diameter.

== Distribution ==
This species has been found at depths greater than 400 meters from one particular area between the South Fiji Basin and Three Kings Rise in the South Pacific north of New Zealand.
