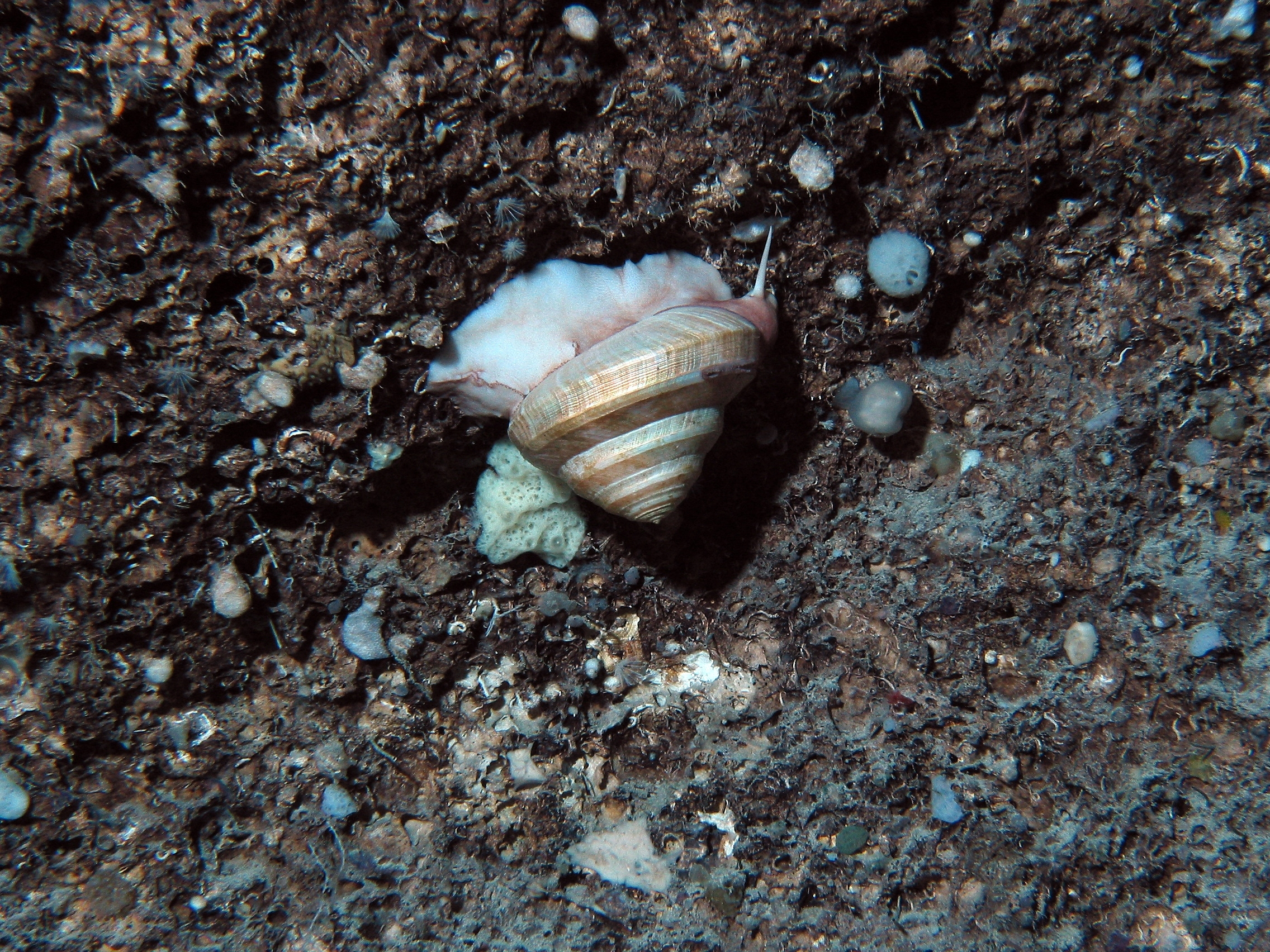
- Live animal of Bayerotrochus midas

Scientific classification
- Kingdom: Animalia
- Phylum: Mollusca
- Class: Gastropoda
- Subclass: Vetigastropoda
- Order: Pleurotomariida
- Family: Pleurotomariidae
- Genus: Bayerotrochus
- Species: B. midas

Binomial name
- Bayerotrochus midas (Bayer, 1966)

Synonyms
- Perotrochus midas Bayer, 1965

= Bayerotrochus midas =

Species of gastropod

Bayerotrochus midas, common name King Midas's slit shell, is a species of sea snail, a marine gastropod mollusk in the family Pleurotomariidae. This gastropod is distinguished by its uniquely structured shell featuring a characteristic slit (or selenizone) and is an important representative of the Vetigastropoda—a clade known for its ancient lineage and specialized shell morphology .

== Taxonomy ==
Bayerotrochus midas was originally described by F. M. Bayer in 1966 (with the original publication dated 1965) under the name Perotrochus midas. Subsequent taxonomic revisions transferred the species to the genus Bayerotrochus, which was coined in honor of marine biologist Frederick M. Bayer. The accepted taxonomic classification is as follows:

== Description ==
The size of the shell varies between 60 mm and 128 mm. Dead Bayerotrochus midas can form shallow marine sediments, and can grow at least as long as 78.9mm.

== Distribution ==
This species occurs in the Caribbean Sea and the Gulf of Mexico; in the Atlantic Ocean off the Bahamas. Bayerotrochus midas is found in warm, tropical to subtropical marine waters of the Atlantic region.
