= Bayerotrochus pyramus =

Scientific classification
- Kingdom: Animalia
- Phylum: Mollusca
- Class: Gastropoda
- Subclass: Vetigastropoda
- Order: Pleurotomariida
- Superfamily: Pleurotomarioidea
- Family: Pleurotomariidae
- Genus: Bayerotrochus
- Species: B. pyramus

Binomial name
- Bayerotrochus pyramus (Bayer, 1967)

Synonyms
- Perotrochus pyramus Bayer, 1967

Species of gastropod

Bayerotrochus pyramus, common name the pyramus slit shell, is a species of large sea snail, a marine gastropod mollusk in the family Pleurotomariidae, the slit snails.

== Description ==
The shell reaches a length of 64 mm.

== Distribution ==
This marine species occurs in the Lesser Antilles off Guadeloupe, St Lucia and Martinique at depths between 400 m and 560 m.
