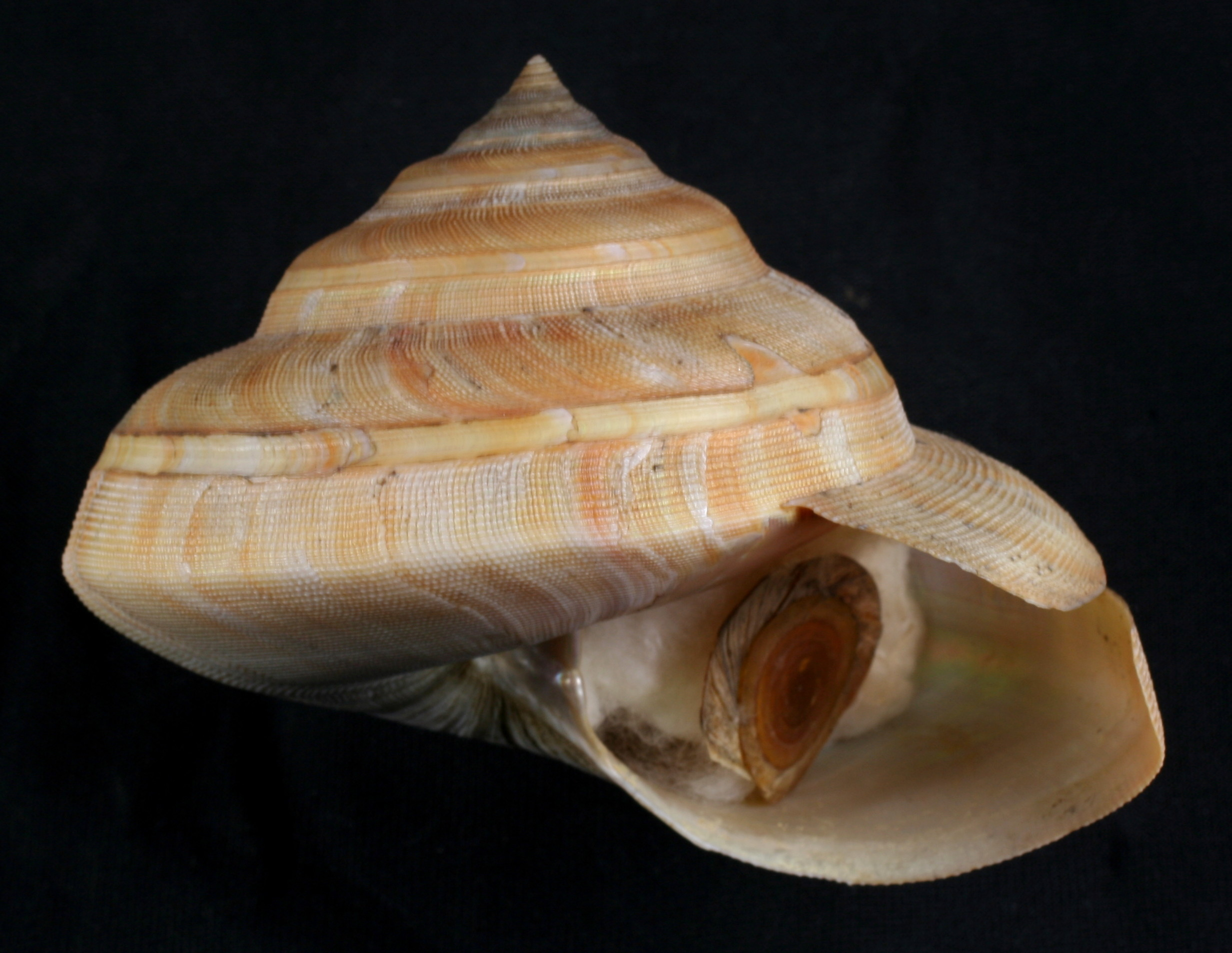
- Shell of Bayerotrochus teramachii (Kuroda, 1955), measuring 77.1 mm height by 100.2 mm diameter, trawled at 100 fathoms at a point 30 miles west of Tong Kang, in Taiwan

Scientific classification
- Kingdom: Animalia
- Phylum: Mollusca
- Class: Gastropoda
- Subclass: Vetigastropoda
- Order: Pleurotomariida
- Family: Pleurotomariidae
- Genus: Bayerotrochus
- Species: B. teramachii

Binomial name
- Bayerotrochus teramachii (Kuroda, 1955)

Synonyms
- Perotrochus teramachii Kuroda, 1955; Bayerotrochus africanus teramachii (Kuroda, 1955)

= Bayerotrochus teramachii =

Species of gastropod

Bayerotrochus teramachii, is a species of sea snail, a marine gastropod mollusc in the family Pleurotomariidae.

== Description ==
The shell has a depressed turbinate shape with an apical spire angle of approximately 98 degrees, with inflated body whorls that are exponential in expansion, a clearly impressed suture, and the periphery is rounded and indistinct. The base is highly inflated with a small columellar callus at the center covering roughly 22 percent of the base area. The aperture is oval, the slit is positioned roughly halfway between the periphery and the suture and is relatively long, about 21 percent of the circumference. The shell is lightly sculptured with numerous spiral cords over 30 above the selenizone (the area where the shell growth filled in the slit) and 17 to 19 spiral cords below the selenizone, crossed by strong axial growth lines which gives the effect of a coarse rectangular pattern. The cords are made up of very fine hemispherical beads. The base has fine microscopically beaded spiral cords.

The protoconch and primary whorls are a dull cream color or white, the rest of the shell is a golden orange, with a golden metallic iridescent sheen. The entire teleoconch (body whorls) has deep orange axial streaks and flammules. The selenizone has 4 to 5 spiral cords and is usually concave in profile. The base is the same base color as the body, and the interior of the aperture is thinly nacreous (pearly). The operculum is roughly circular, light brown, multispiral, and chitinous. Size range: 64 to 175 mm diameter.

== Distribution ==
This species has been found at depths of 180 to 500 meters over a large area of the North West Pacific from Japan to the South China Sea, and across to Indonesia and the Philippines.
