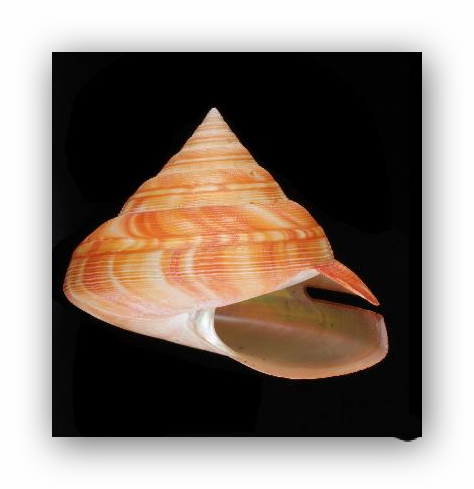
- Shell of Bayerotrochus africanus (specimen in MNHN, Paris)

Scientific classification
- Kingdom: Animalia
- Phylum: Mollusca
- Class: Gastropoda
- Subclass: Vetigastropoda
- Order: Pleurotomariida
- Family: Pleurotomariidae
- Genus: Bayerotrochus
- Species: B. africanus

Binomial name
- Bayerotrochus africanus (Tomlin, 1948)

Synonyms
- Bayerotrochus africanus africanus (Tomlin, 1948); Perotrochus africanus (Tomlin, 1948); Pleurotomaria africana Tomlin, 1948

= Bayerotrochus africanus =

Species of gastropod

Bayerotrochus africanus, common name the South African slit shell, is a species of sea snail, a marine gastropod mollusc in the family Pleurotomariidae.

== Description ==
The shell grows to a length of 120 mm.

== Distribution ==
This species is distributed along South Africa.
