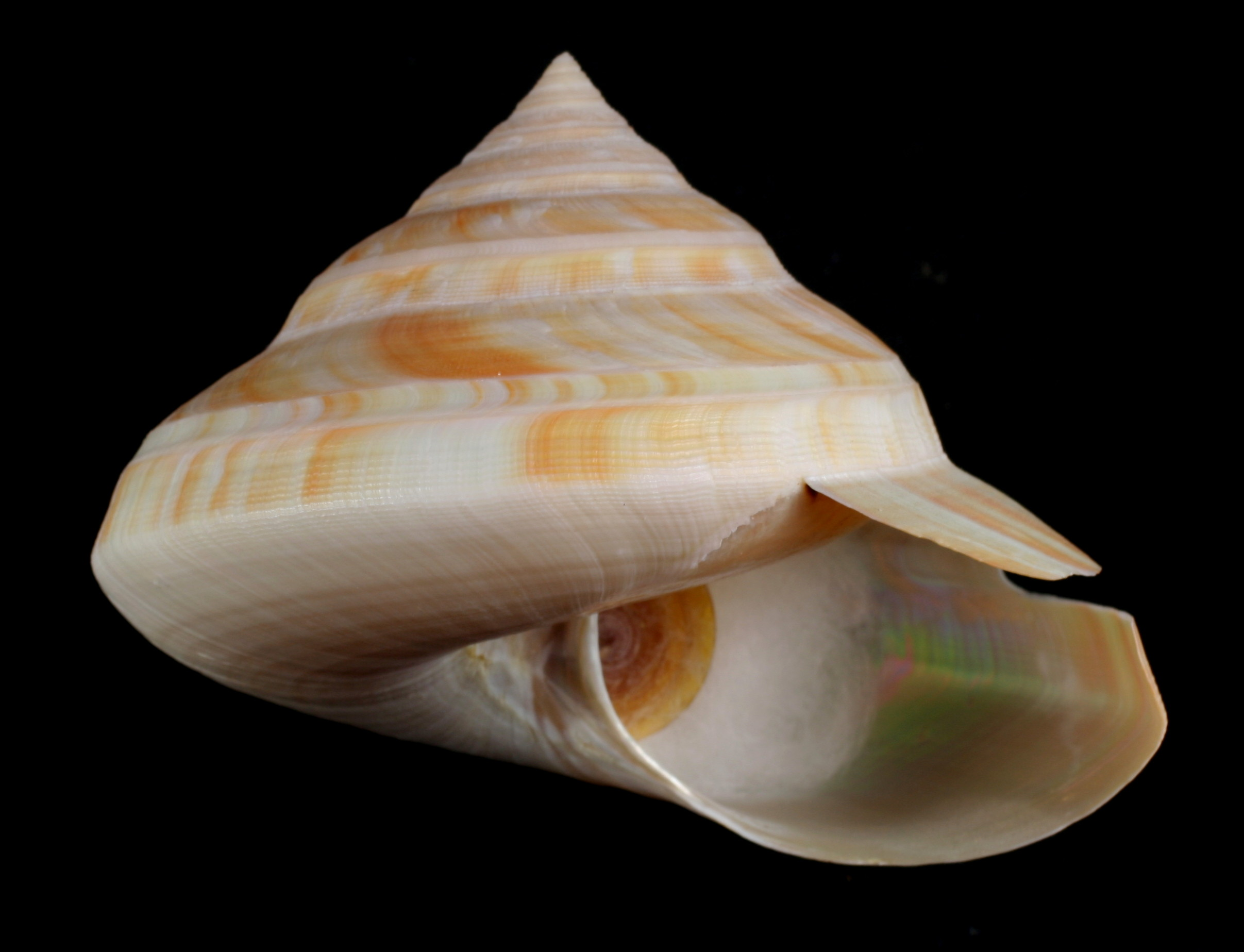
- Apertural view with operculum of a shell of Bayerotrochus westralis

Scientific classification
- Kingdom: Animalia
- Phylum: Mollusca
- Class: Gastropoda
- Subclass: Vetigastropoda
- Order: Pleurotomariida
- Family: Pleurotomariidae
- Genus: Bayerotrochus; Harasewych, 2002

Type species
- Perotrochus midas Bayer, 1965

Species
- See text

= Bayerotrochus =

Genus of gastropods

Bayerotrochus is a genus of sea snails, marine gastropod mollusks in the family Pleurotomariidae.

The generic name Bayerotrochus is in honor of marine biologist Frederick Bayer.

The shells of the snails in this genus show a selenizone.

== Species ==
Species within the genus Bayerotrochus include:

- Bayerotrochus africanus (Tomlin, 1948)
- Bayerotrochus boucheti (Anseeuw & Poppe, 2001)
- Bayerotrochus charlestonensis (Askew, 1988)
- Bayerotrochus diluculum (Okutani, 1979)
- Bayerotrochus indicus (Anseeuw, 1999)
- Bayerotrochus midas (Bayer, 1966)
- Bayerotrochus philpoppei Anseeuw, Poppe & Goto, 2006
- Bayerotrochus poppei Anseeuw, 2003
- Bayerotrochus pyramus (Bayer, 1967)
- Bayerotrochus quiquandoni Cossignani, 2018
- Bayerotrochus tangaroanus (Bouchet & Métivier, 1982)
- Bayerotrochus teramachii (Kuroda, 1955)
- Bayerotrochus westralis (Whitehead, 1987)
