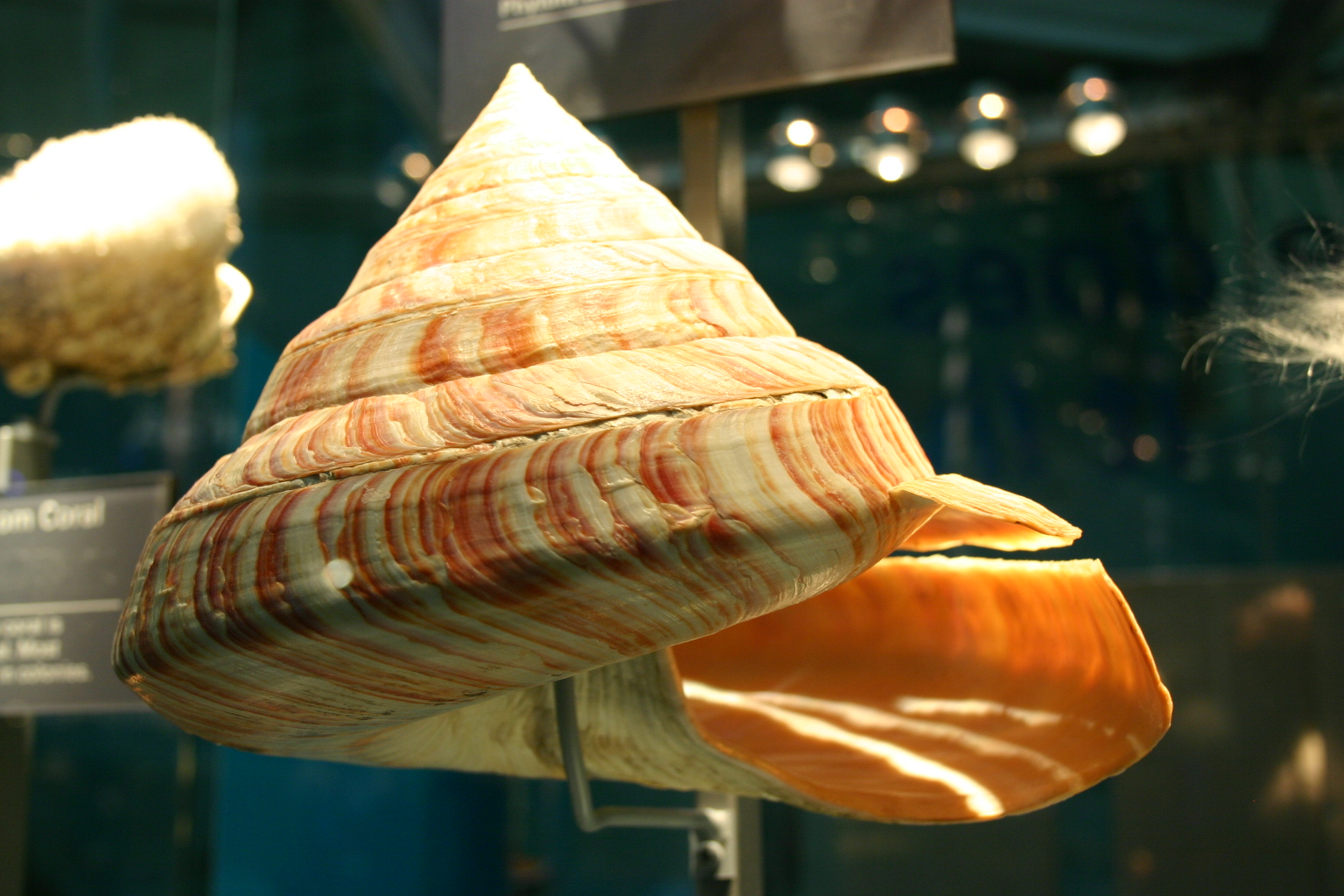
- A shell of Entemnotrochus rumphii

Scientific classification
- Kingdom: Animalia
- Phylum: Mollusca
- Class: Gastropoda
- Subclass: Vetigastropoda
- Order: Pleurotomariida
- Superfamily: Pleurotomarioidea
- Family: Pleurotomariidae
- Genus: Entemnotrochus; Fischer, 1885

Type species
- Pleurotomaria adansoniana Crosse & P. Fischer, 1861

Synonyms
- Pleurotomaria (Entemnotrochus) P. Fischer, 1885

= Entemnotrochus =

Genus of gastropods

Entemnotrochus is a genus of large to very large deepwater sea snails with gills and an operculum, marine gastropod mollusks in the family Pleurotomariidae, the slit snails.

== Extant Species ==
According to the World Register of Marine Species (WoRMS), the following species with valid names are included within the genus Entemnotrochus :

- Entemnotrochus adansonianus (Crosse & Fischer, 1861)
- Entemnotrochus rumphii (Schepman, 1879)

Species brought into synonymy

- Entemnotrochus urashima Shikama & Oishi in Shikama, 1977 : synonym of Entemnotrochus rumphii (Schepman, 1879)

== Fossil species ==
- Entemnotrochus ozakii Kase & Katayama, 1981
- Entemnotrochus panchangwui Lin, 1975
- Entemnotrochus Shikamai Kanie, 1973
- Entemnotrochus siuyingae Lin, 1975
