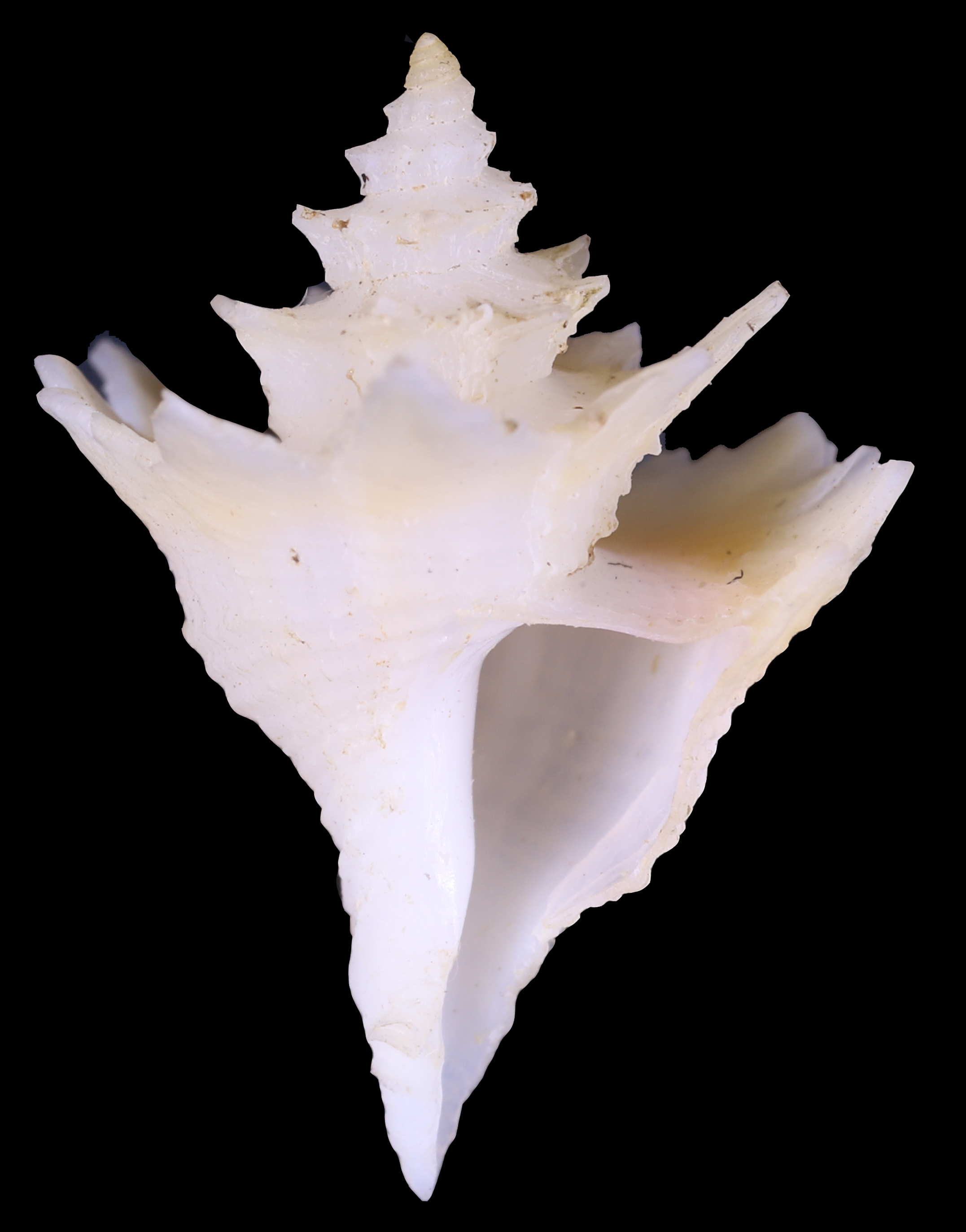
- Shell of Babelomurex fax (specimen at MNHN, Paris)

Scientific classification
- Kingdom: Animalia
- Phylum: Mollusca
- Class: Gastropoda
- Subclass: Caenogastropoda
- Order: Neogastropoda
- Family: Muricidae
- Genus: Babelomurex
- Species: B. fax

Binomial name
- Babelomurex fax (F. M. Bayer, 1971)

Synonyms
- Coralliophila fax F. M. Bayer, 1971 (original combination)

= Babelomurex fax =

Species of gastropod

Babelomurex fax is a species of sea snail, a marine gastropod mollusc in the family Muricidae, the murex snails or rock snails.

== Distribution ==
Found in the Gulf of Mexico off Florida and Guadeloupe.
