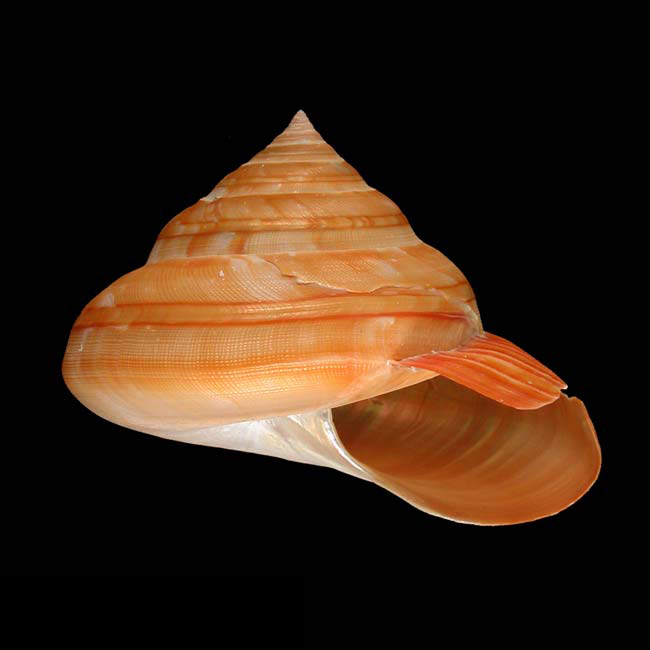

Scientific classification
- Kingdom: Animalia
- Phylum: Mollusca
- Class: Gastropoda
- Subclass: Vetigastropoda
- Order: Pleurotomariida
- Family: Pleurotomariidae
- Genus: Bayerotrochus
- Species: B. boucheti

Binomial name
- Bayerotrochus boucheti (Anseeuw & Poppe, 2001)

Synonyms
- Perotrochus boucheti Anseeuw & Poppe, 2001 (original combination)

= Bayerotrochus boucheti =

Species of gastropod

Bayerotrochus boucheti is a species of sea snail, a marine gastropod mollusc in the family Pleurotomariidae.

== Subspecies ==
- Bayerotrochus boucheti boucheti (Anseeuw & Poppe, 2001)
- Bayerotrochus boucheti mirificus Anseeuw, 2016

== Description ==
The length of the shell varies between 60 mm and 70 mm.

== Distribution ==
This marine species occurs off Norfolk Ridge, New Caledonia.
