= Frederick Bayer =

American malacologist and cnidariologist (1921–2007)

Frederick Merkle Bayer (October 31, 1921 — October 2, 2007) was an American curator emeritus at the Smithsonian Institution's National Museum of Natural History and a marine biologist who specialized in the study of soft corals.

== Early life and education ==
Frederick Bayer was born on Halloween night 1921, in Asbury Park, New Jersey, but spent much of his childhood in South Florida, where he collected seashells and became an amateur naturalist.

Bayer joined the Army Air Forces from December 1942 to December 1945. While in the Army Air Forces, he was a photographic technician with the 36th Photo Reconnaissance unit in the Pacific War during World War II. While in the military, he often sketched and collected fish, shells and butterflies throughout New Guinea, the Philippines, and Okinawa.

Bayer received his bachelor's degree from the University of Miami. He continued his studies and obtained a master's degree in taxonomy from George Washington University in 1954. In 1958, he completed a doctorate in taxonomy from George Washington University.

== Career ==
Bayer worked at the Smithsonian's National Museum of Natural History from 1947 until 1961. He returned to work at the museum again from 1975 until 1996. He served as a professor at the University of Miami's Rosenstiel School of Marine, Atmospheric, and Earth Science between 1961 and 1975. While at the University of Miami, Bayer participated in a number of soft coral-collecting expeditions in the Caribbean Sea and in the waters off West Africa.

Following his arrival at the Smithsonian, Bayer was sent to Bikini Atoll in the Pacific Ocean to study the effects of nuclear testing on the island's marine life, as part of the re-survey conducted one year after the Able and Baker tests of 1946 were carried out. Bayer also spent several months doing field research throughout the rest of Micronesia.

Bayer wrote over 130 scholarly papers on the history and taxonomy of soft coral. He focused much of his soft coral research on octocorals, which include sea fans and sea whips. He discovered 170 new species of marine life, 40 new genera, and three new families.

Japan's Emperor Hirohito, also a marine biologist, named a hydroid, Hydractinia bayeri, in Bayer's honor. Bayer returned the favor while Hirohito was on a state visit to Washington, D.C. in 1975. He presented Hirohito with a rare snail shell which was the "size of a hat."

Bayer served as a member of the International Commission on Zoological Nomenclature from 1972 to 1995.

He was also an accomplished biological illustrator. Bayer painted and designed a total of 14 scientifically accurate marine scenes. These particular scenes were used for a set of Haitian postage stamps in 1973.

== Death ==
Frederick Bayer died of congestive heart failure on October 2, 2007, at Washington Home hospice in Washington, D.C. at the age of 85.

== Taxa named in honor ==
Taxa named in honor of Frederick Bayer include:

- Bayerxenia Alderslade, 2001
- Bayericerithium Petuch, 2001
- Bayerotrochus Harasewych, 2002
- Bayergorgia Williams & López-González, 2005
- Hydractinia bayeri Hirohito, 1984

== Taxa named by him ==
Taxa named by Frederick Bayer include:

gastropods:

- Babelomurex fax (F. M. Bayer, 1971)
- Babelomurex sentix (Bayer, 1971)
- Bayerotrochus midas (Bayer, 1965)
- Bayerotrochus pyramus (Bayer, 1967)
- Cyomesus chaunax (Bayer, 1971) and Teramachia chaunax Bayer, 1971 are synonyms of Latiromitra cryptodon (P. Fischer, 1882)
- Lyria cordis Bayer, 1971
- Peristarium Bayer, 1971
- Peristarium aurora (Bayer, 1971)
- Peristarium electra (Bayer, 1971)
- Peristarium merope (Bayer, 1971)
- Perotrochus amabilis (Bayer, 1963)
- Perotrochus lucaya Bayer, 1965
- Scaphella evelina Bayer, 1971
- Siphonochelus tityrus (Bayer, 1971)
- Thelyssa Bayer, 1971
- Thelyssa callisto Bayer, 1971
- Volutomitra erebus Bayer, 1971
- Volutomitra persephone Bayer, 1971

bivalves:

- Amphichama inezae (F. M. Bayer, 1943)

== See also ==
Other malacologists named Bayer include:

- Charles Gustave François Hubert Bayer (1887-1956) from Netherlands
- L. Bayer from Belgium/Africa
