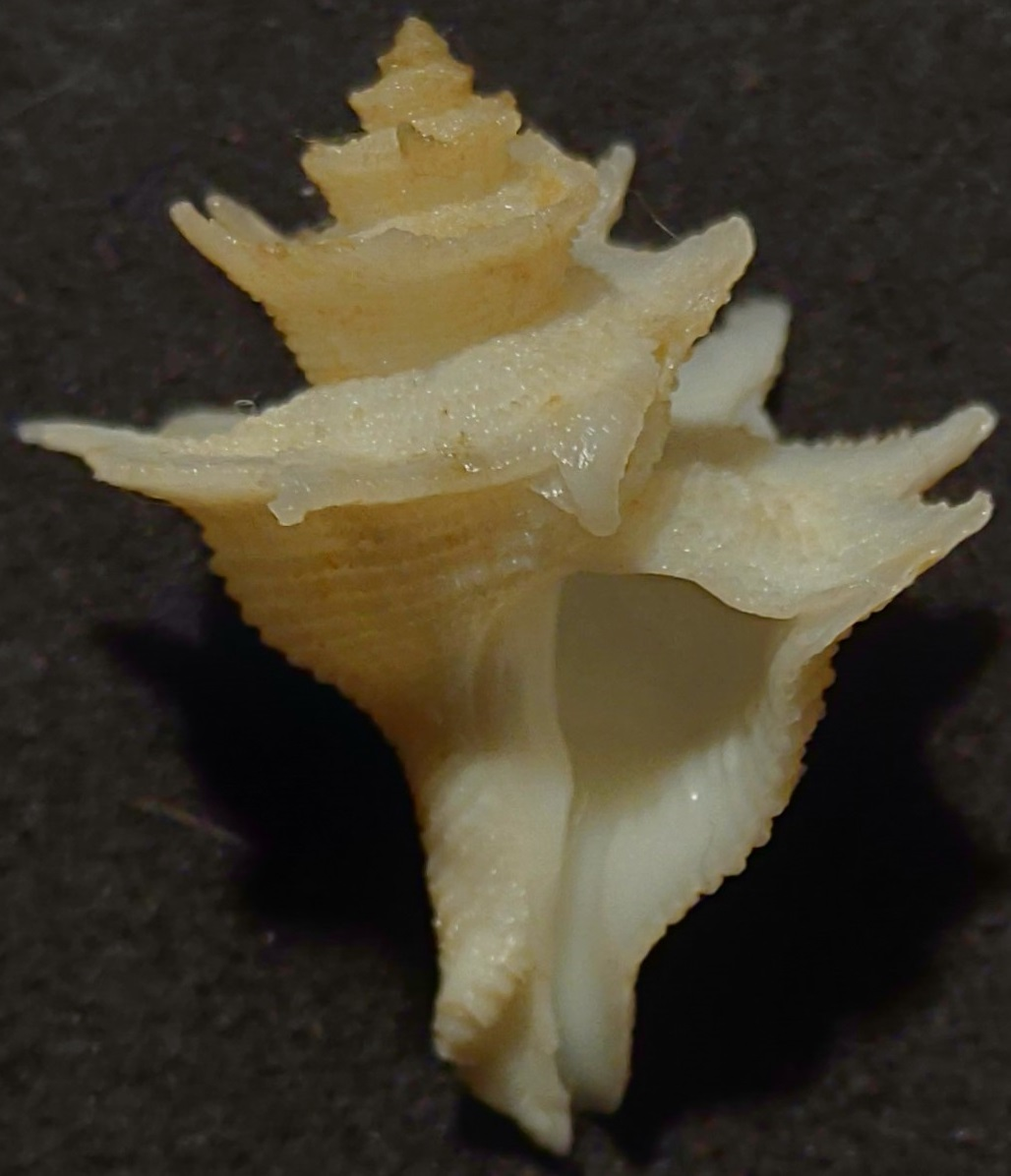
- Shell of Babelomurex sentix (specimen at MNHN, Paris)

Scientific classification
- Kingdom: Animalia
- Phylum: Mollusca
- Class: Gastropoda
- Subclass: Caenogastropoda
- Order: Neogastropoda
- Family: Muricidae
- Genus: Babelomurex
- Species: B. sentix

Binomial name
- Babelomurex sentix (Bayer, 1971)

Synonyms
- Coralliophila sentix Bayer, 1971; Latiaxis sentix carcassii Nicolay and Angioy,1985

= Babelomurex sentix =

Species of gastropod

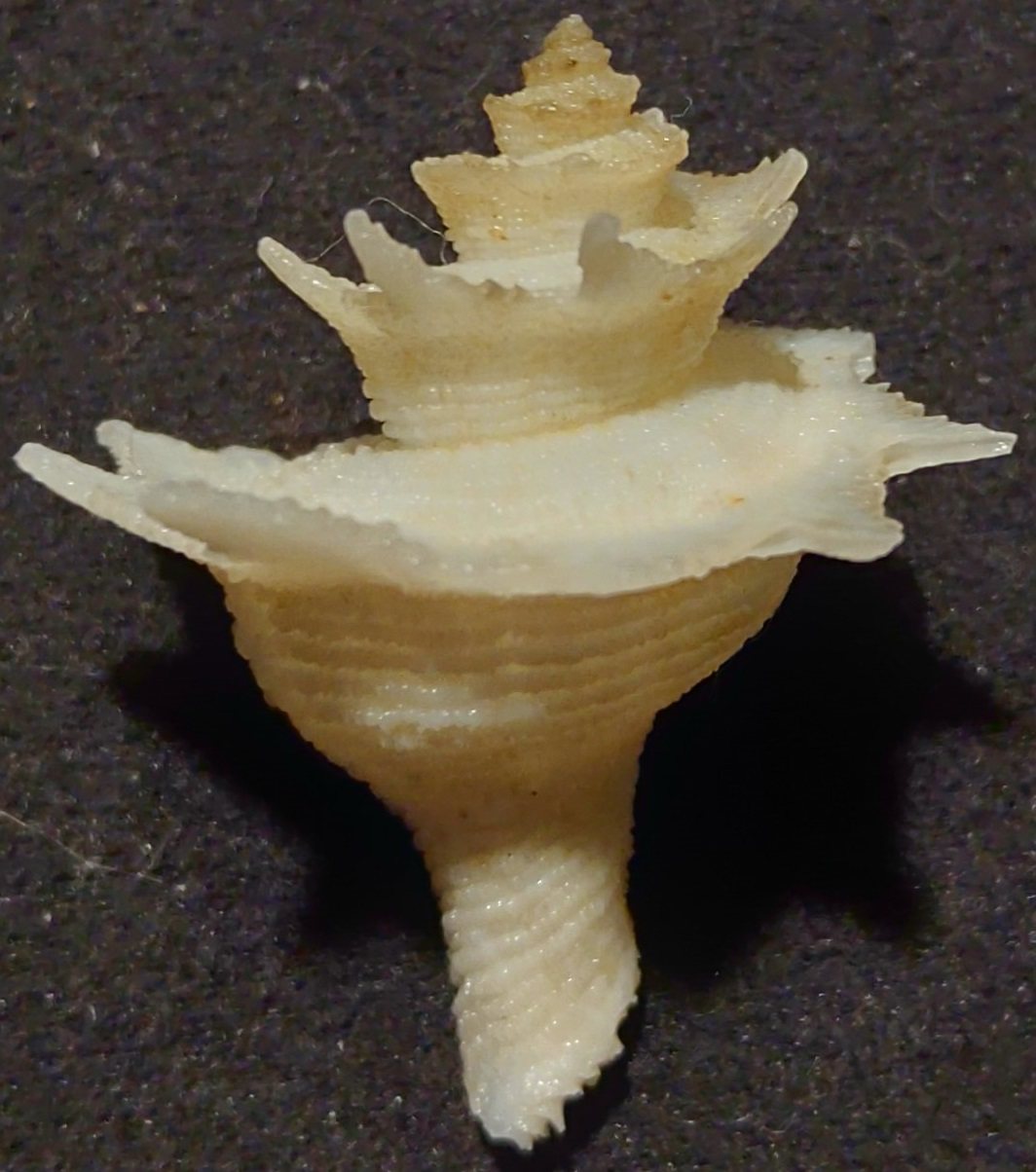

Babelomurex sentix is a species of sea snail, a marine gastropod mollusc in the family Muricidae, the murex snails or rock snails.

== Distribution ==
This marine species occurs off Guadeloupe.
