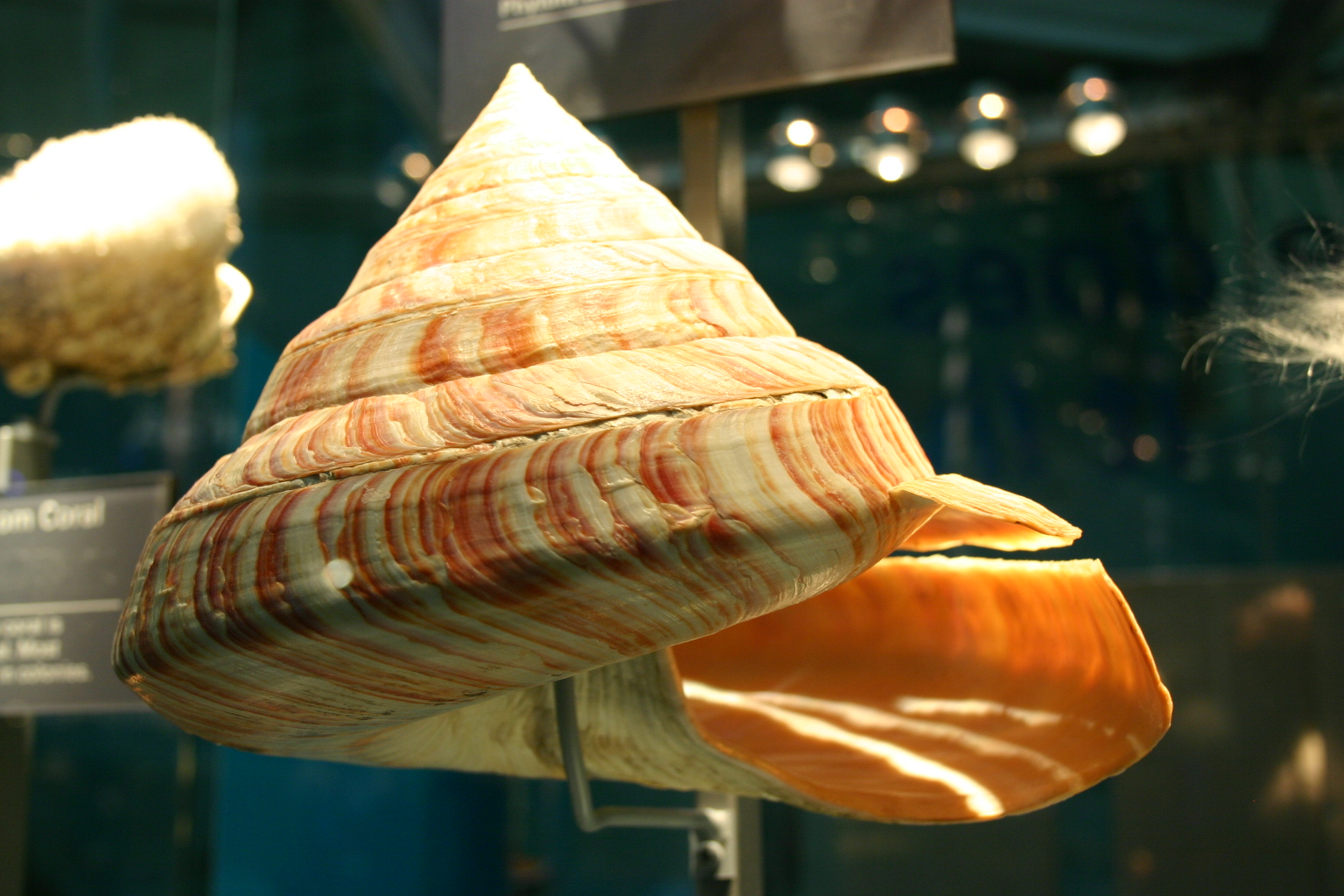
- Apertural view of a shell of Entemnotrochus rumphii

Scientific classification
- Kingdom: Animalia
- Phylum: Mollusca
- Class: Gastropoda
- Subclass: Vetigastropoda
- Order: Pleurotomariida
- Superfamily: Pleurotomarioidea
- Family: Pleurotomariidae; Swainson, 1840

Genera
- See text

= Pleurotomariidae =

Pleurotomariidae Temporal range: Upper Cambrian–Present

Family of gastropods

Pleurotomariidae, common name the "slit snails", is a family of large marine gastropods in the superfamily Pleurotomarioidea of the subclass Vetigastropoda. This family is a very ancient lineage; there were numerous species in the geological past. The genus includes several hundred fossil forms, mostly Paleozoic. It is one of the oldest gastropod families, commencing in the Cambrian.

The superfamily is currently represented by a group of species that live only in deep water. This family has no subfamilies.

The first living specimens of a species in this family, Perotrochus quoyanus, were dredged in 1879 in deep water off the West Indies by the "Blake" expedition of William Healey Dall.

== Description ==
The shell has a trochoidal shape. It is nacreous within. It is umbilicate or imperforate, having a deep slit or sinus in the outer superior margin of the peristome, which serves the purpose of an exhalant phase of respiration, and leaves on the corresponding part of the whorls a peculiarly sculptured band, the "anal fasciole" or the "slit fasciole." The slit is sealed up gradually behind the advancing aperture as the shells grows in size.

The animal has no frontal lobes or appendages. The eyes are situated at the outer bases of the tentacles. The muzzle is as in Trochidae. The tentacles are long, subcylindrical and bluntly pointed. The broad epipodium (the lateral grooves between foot and mantle) is thin, entire, and fringed with a row of small, short papillae. But it does bear cirri. It is closely applied to the shell. The long radula has a long, narrow rhachidian tooth. It is lanceolate with its tip narrowand recurved. There are 26 laterals with the outer 5 without cusps. The inner ones are larger, with wide cusps and narrower bases. The outside of the laterals consists of 2 rows of uncini (the numerous small teeth-like or hook-like structures). The inner series number 18 and are large, strongly curved, and with scythe-shaped 1–3 denticulate cusps. The outer uncini are very numerous (40–50), small, very oblique. In Entemnotrochus adansonianus (Crosse & P. Fischer, 1861) there are considerable differences in the teeth. Some of the uncini bear little tufts of bristles at their apices. The jaws are subobsolete.

== Fossil record ==
The Pleurotomariidae have a continuous fossil record from the Upper Cambrian onwards. After taking a considerable hit during the Cretaceous–Paleogene extinction event, they have been restricted to deeper waters through the Cenozoic. In 2009, a new study in the Journal of Paleontology described the first occurrence of Mesozoic pleurotomariids from Antarctica.

== Ecology ==
Species in the family Pleurotomariidae live at depths of 150–300 metres, as benthos on the bottom in the mesopelagic zone. They are preyed upon by crustacea and fish, but are remarkably resistant to attack – they secrete a white fluid when endangered, thought to repel predators. They feed primarily on sponges, and supplement their diet with crinoids and octocorals in the wild; in aquaria, they also feed on fish and clam tissue.

== Genera ==
Genera within the Pleurotomariidae include:

- Bayerotrochus Harasewych, 2002
- Entemnotrochus Fischer, 1885
- † Mamoeatomaria Begg & Grant-Mackie, 2006
- Mikadotrochus Lindholm, 1927
- † Obornella Cox, 1959
- Perotrochus Fischer, 1885
- † Pleurotomaria Sowerby, 1821
- † Trochotoma Eudes-Deslongchamps, 1842
