= Pimenteira Formation =

Geological formation in Brazil

- Stratigraphic range: Late Eifelian-Famennian; ~390–372 Ma
- Type: Geological formation
- Unit of: Canindé Group
- Sub-units: Picos Member; Passagem Member
- Underlies: Cabeças Formation
- Overlies: Itaim Formation
- Thickness: 20 m (66 ft)

Location
- Region: Piauí; Tocantins
- Country: Brazil
- Extent: Parnaíba Basin

Type section
- Named for: Pimenteiras, Piauí

The Pimenteira Formation, also known as Pimenteiras Formation, is an Mid to Late Devonian geological formation of the Parnaíba Basin, northeastern Brazil. It mainly outcrops in the states of Piauí and Tocantins. It was deposited in a shallow sea, under the influence of currents and storm waves, as well as fluvio-deltaic influences.

Being part of the Malvinokaffric Realm, it haboured a diverse fauna of invertebrates such as trilobites, brachiopods, bivalves, gastropods, and tentaculids, as well as elamobranches and plant remains.

== History ==
The name 'Pimenteira' was first proposed by Small (1914) to ascribe a shale sequence 20 m in thickness close to the municipality of Pimenteiras, Piauí. Caster (1948), reported on the occurrence of several fossils in the area, like trilobites and shark fin bones, and Kegel (1953) later visited the region between Picos and Pimenteiras, collecting specimens and later describing them.

Initially, Kegel (1952) divided the formation into the Itaim and Picos members. Blankennagel (1952) later considered that only the Picos Member is part of the formation, with the Itaim Member being the upper part of the Serra Grande Formation.

== Description ==
=== Geology ===
The Pimenteiro Formation is made up of dense dark-grey shale sections interlayered with thick to thin sandstone, commonly found are also hummocky cross-stratification. The formation is interpreted as a transgressive system, deposited under a shallow marine environment with the influence of storm waves. It possesses two sub-units, the lower Picos Member and the upper Passagem Member.

The Picos Member is composed by sandstone and intercalated siltstone and shale, with common hummocky cross-stratification, representing the first great Devonian transgression into the Parnaíba Basin. The sandstone is well defined in the old strata, of Middle Devonian origin, but it gradually fizzles out as it approaches the upper layers, of Late Devonian origin. The Passagem Member is composed by thin and micaceous sandstone, with asymptotic and hummocky stratification. This unit represents a system of fluvio-deltaic floods, in which turbulent, episodic flows went beyond the coastal limit.

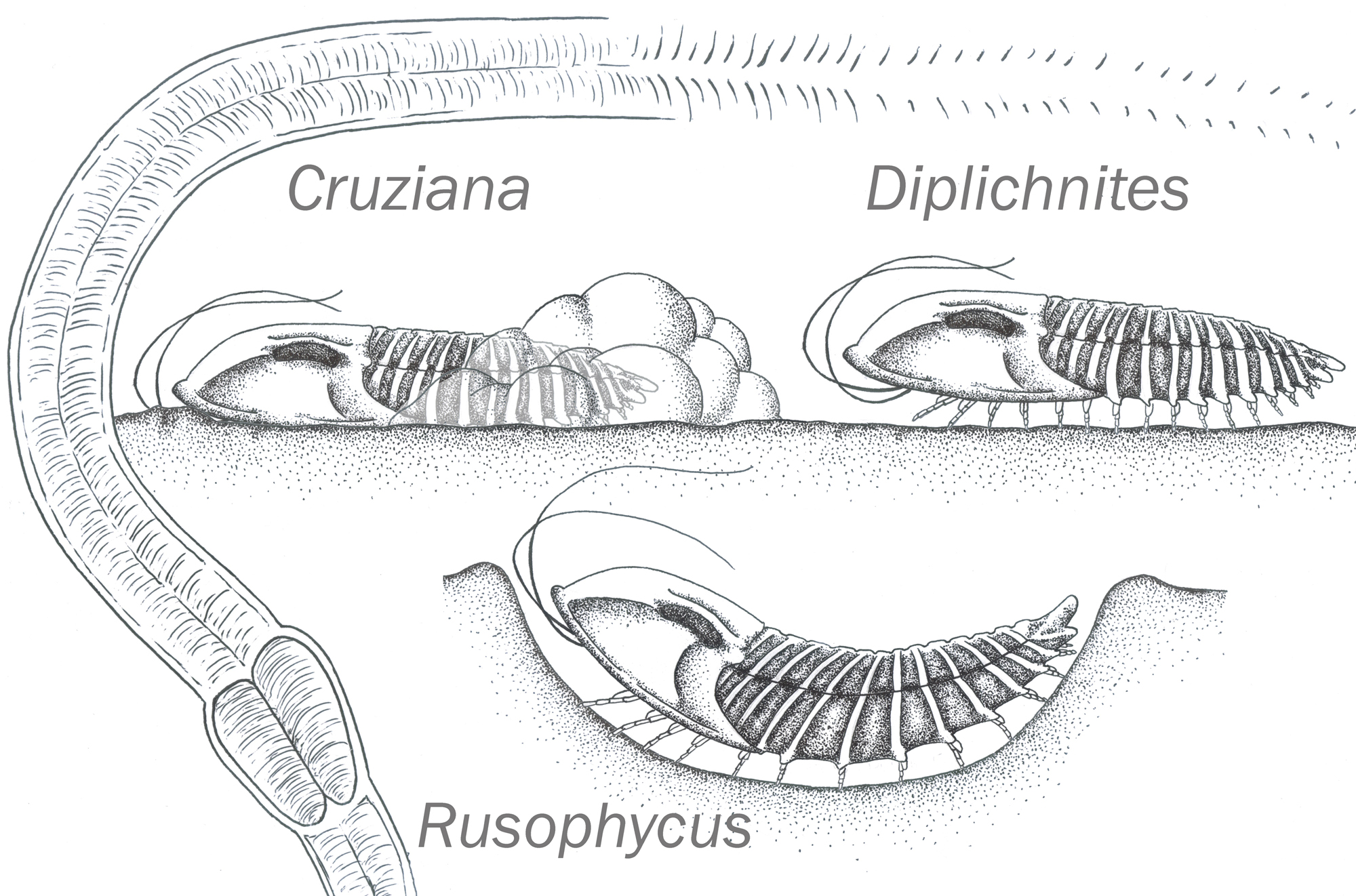
Illustration exemplifying the types of ichnofossils left by trilobites.

The formation has outcrops on the states of Piauí and Tocantins. Sediments on the eastern border of the formation are dated be from the Late Eifelian to the Early Givetian, while the central and western portions were dated to be from the Late Eifelian to the Early Famennian.

=== Paleoenvironment ===
When it was deposited, the Pimenteiro Formation was a shallow marine environment under the influence of currents and storm waves, as well as fluvio-deltaic influences. The Passagem Member has been proposed to be influenced by episodic floods. During the Mid to Late Devonian, the formation was situated below the antarctic circle, its fauna being part of the endemic Malvinokaffric Realm.

It haboured a diverse fauna of invertebrates such as trilobites, brachiopods, ostracods, bivalves, gastropods, hyolithids, and tentaculids, as well as fish, like elamobranches and acanthodians. Plant remains are also found, as well as ichnofossils.

== Fossil Content ==
=== Flora ===
Color key: Taxon / Reclassified taxon / Taxon falsely reported as present / Dubious taxon or junior synonym / Ichnotaxon / Ootaxon / Morphotaxon	Notes; Uncertain or tentative taxa are in small text; ~~crossed out~~ taxa are discredited.

Genus	Species	Presence	Description	Images
Archaeosigillaria	A. picosensis	Picos Member.	A lepidodendrale lycophyte.	
Haplostigma	H. furquei	Passagem Member.	A lycophyte.	
Paleostigma	P. sewardii	Passagem Member.	A lepidodendrale lycophyte.	
Protolepidodendron	P. kegeli	Picos Member.	A protolepidodendrale lycophyte.	
Sigillaria	S. sp.	Picos Member.	A lepidodendrale lycophyte.	
Spongiophyton	S. sp.	Picos Member.	A spongiophytace.	

=== Arthropods ===
Genus	Species	Presence	Description	Images
Burmeisteria	B. notica	Picos Member.	A homalonotid trilobite.	
Eldredgeia	cf. E. venusta	Picos Member.	A calmoniid trilobite.	
Metacryphaeus	M. cf. australis M. kegeli M. meloi M. turbeculatus	Picos Member. Passagem Member.	A calmoniid trilobite.	

=== Echinoderms ===
Genus	Species	Presence	Description	Images
Exaesiodiscus	E. dimerocrinosus E. sp.	Picos Member, mid-upper Eifelian.	A crinoid. Possibly related to Dimerocrinites.	
Laudonomphalus	L. aff. L. tuberosus L. sp. A L. sp. B L. sp. C L. sp. D	Picos Member.	A flucticharacid crinoid.	
Marettocrinus	M. sp.	Picos Member.		
Monstrocrinus	M. incognitus	Picos Member, mid-upper Eifelian.	A rhodocrinitid crinoid.	

=== Brachipod ===
Genus	Species	Presence	Description	Images
Amphigenia	A. cf. A. elongata	Picos Member.	A brachiopod.	
Australocoelia	A. palmata	Picos Member.	A brachiopod.	
Australospirifer	A. iheringi	Picos Member.	A brachiopod.	
Chonetoidea indet.		Passagem Member.	A brachiopod.	
Lingula	L. sp. Lingula cf. L. manni	Picos Member. Passagem Member.	A lingulid brachipod.	
Monsenetes	M. cf. M. boliviensis	Picos Member. Passagem Member.	A brachiopod.	
Montsenetes	M. carolinae	Picos Member.		
Mucrospirifer	M. cf. M. pedroanus	Picos Member. Passagem Member.	A mucrospiriferid brachiopod	
Orbiculoidea	O. sp.	Picos Member.	A discinid brachiopod.	
Pleurochonetes	P. comstocki	Passagem Member.	A brachiopod.	
Pustulatia	P. ? curupira	Passagem Member.	A brachiopod.	
Spiriferida indet.		Passagem Member.	A spiriferida brachipod.	
Terebratulida indet.		Picos Member. Passagem Member.	A terebratulida brachiopod.	
Tropidoleptus	T. carinatus	Picos Member. Passagem Member.	A tropidoleptid brachiopod.	

=== Conulariids ===
Genus	Species	Presence	Description	Images
Conularia	C. sp. ?C. cf. C. africana	Picos Member. Passagem Member.	A conulariid.	
Ctenoconularia	C. cf. C. undulata	Picos Member.	A conulariid.	

=== Tentaculites ===
Genus	Species	Presence	Description	Images
Styolina	S. clavulus	Passagem Member.	A tentaculite.	
Tentaculites	T. cf. T. eldregianus T. oseryi	Passagem Member.	A tentaculitid tentaculite.	

=== Annelids ===
Genus	Species	Presence	Description	Images
Annulitubus	A. fernandesi	Uppermost Pimenteira Formation.	A polychaete annelid.	

=== Molluscs ===
Genus	Species	Presence	Description	Images
Bucanella	B. sp. B aff. B. deiremsi B. laticarinata B. quadrilobata	Picos Member. Passagem Member.	A bucanellid bivalve.	
Cucullella	C. triquetra	Picos Member. Passagem Member.	A cucullellid bivalve.	
Grammysioidea	G. lundi	Passagem Member.	A grammysiid bivalve.	
Palaeoneilo	P. sp. P. sp. A P. sp. B	Picos Member. Passagem Member.	A malletiid bivalve.	
Platyceras	P. (Platystoma) baini	Passagem Member.	A platyceratid gastropod.	
Plectonotus	P. (Plectonotus) derbyi	Picos Member. Passagem Member.	A plectonotine gastropod.	
Nuculites	N. sp. N. aff. N. oblongatus	Picos Member. Passagem Member.	A cucullellid bivalve.	
Spathella	S. pimentana	Passagem Member.	A modiomorphid bivalve.	
Tropidodiscus	T. sp.	Picos Member.	A tropidodiscid gastropod.	

=== Fishes ===
Genus	Species	Presence	Description	Images
Acanthodii indet.		Picos Member.	A fin spine. The lack of distinctive features prevents identification.	
Antarctilamna	cf. A. sp.	Picos Member.	A dorsal spine, resembling A. ultima and A. seriponensis.	
Chondrichthyan indet.		Picos Member.	A fin spine, resembling that of Ctenacanthus.	
Climatiiformes indet. 1		Picos Member.	A fin spine, similar to that of Ptomacanthus anglicus.	Ptomacanthus anglicus.
Climatiiformes indet. 2		Picos Member.	Fin spines, similar to that of Climatius enodicosta.	Climatius
Ctenacanthus	C. kegeli Aff. C. sp.	Picos Member.	A ctenacanth shark.	
Groenlandaspididae indet.		Picos Member.	Dermal plates of an unidentified groenlandaspidid placoderm.	Groenlandaspis
Machaeracanthus	M. sp.	Picos Member.	An acanthodian fish.	
Xenacanth indet.		Picos Member.	A bicuspid tooth, resembling those of xenacanths.	

=== Ichnofossils ===
Genus	Species	Presence	Description	Images
Arenicolites		Picos Member.	Burrow made by some kind of worm.	
Asteriacites	A. isp. A. stelliforme	Picos Member.	Burrow of sea stars on the sea floor.	
Bifungites	B. munizi B. piauiensis	Picos Member. Passagem Member.	Possible Annulitubus burrow.	
Conichnus		Picos Member.		
Cruziana		Picos Member. Passagem Member.	Trilobite burrows.	
Diplichnites		Picos Member.	Arthropod trackways.	
Gyrophylites		Passagem Member.		
Merostomichnites	M. piauiensis	Picos Member.	Eurypterid traces.	
Neoskolithos	N. picosensis	Picos Member.		
Palaeophycus	P. tubularis	Picos Member.	Open burrows, probably made by polychaetes.	
Phicosiphon	P. incertum	Picos Member.		
Planolites	P. beverleyensis	Picos Member.	Traces left by the feeding process of worm-like animals.	
Rusophycus		Picos Member. Passagem Member.	A trilobite resting trace.	
Scolicia		Picos Member.	Traces assigned to various groups.	
Skolithos		Picos Member.	A burrow.	
Zoophycus		Picos Member	Trace produced by moving and feeding polychaete worms.	
