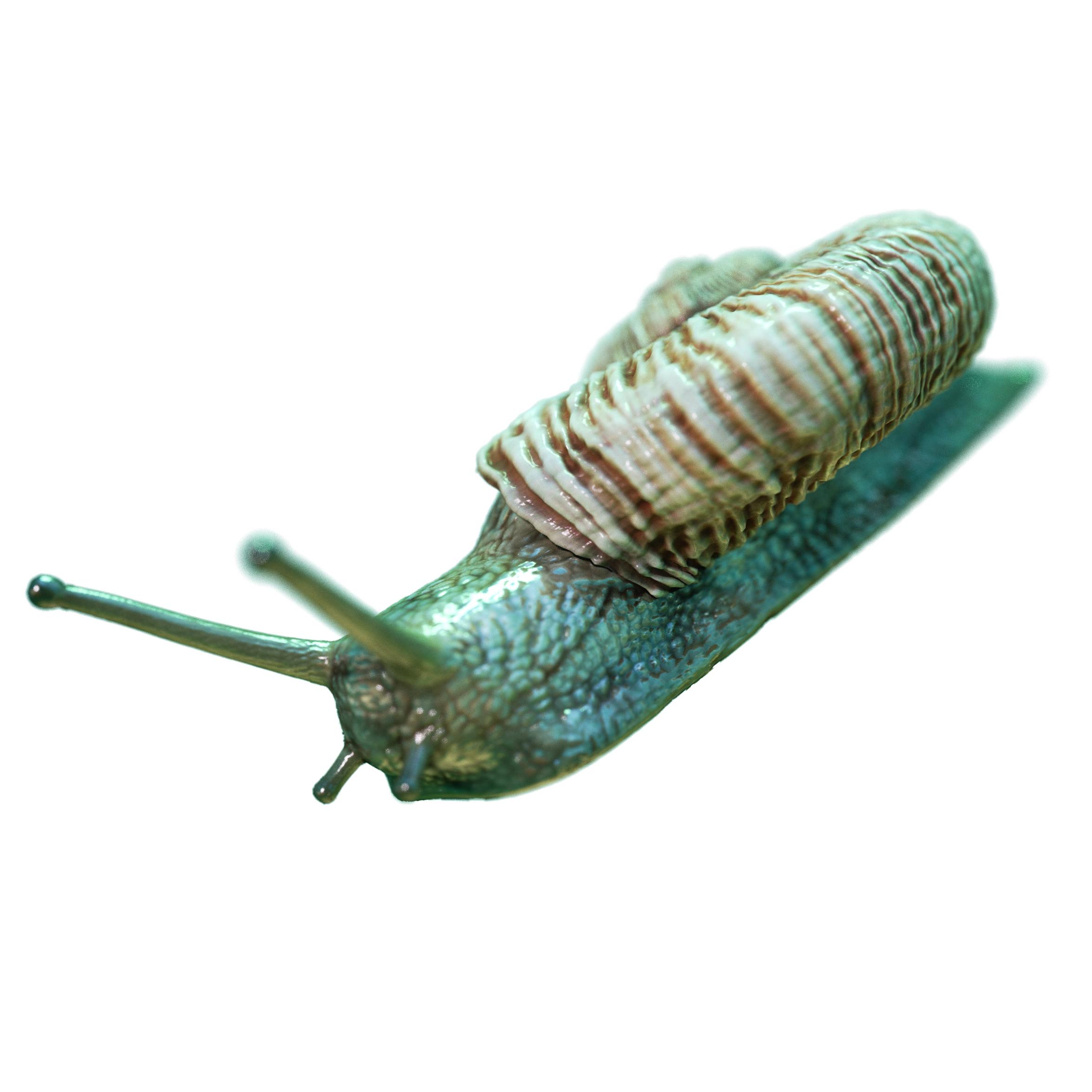
- 3D model of a gastropod (Phragmolites).

Scientific classification
- Kingdom: Animalia
- Phylum: Mollusca
- Class: Gastropoda (?)
- Order: †Bellerophontida
- Family: †Bucaniidae
- Subfamily: †Bucaniinae
- Genus: †Phragmolites; Conrad, 1838

Species
- See text

Synonyms
- Conradella Ulrich and Scofield, 1897

= Phragmolites =

Phragmolites Temporal range: 460.9–439.0 Ma

Extinct genus of molluscs

Phragmolites is an extinct genus of molluscs in the family Bucaniidae, paleozoic molluscs of uncertain position possibly being either Gastropods or Monoplacophorans in the superfamily Bellerophontoidea.

P. elegans Miller 1874 (syn. Conradella elegans, Cyrtolites elegans) is from the Ordovician of Ohio.

== Species ==
Phragmolites bellulus, Phragmolites cellulosus, Phragmolites compressus (type), Phragmolites desideratus, Phragmolites dyeri, Phragmolites elegans, Phragmolites excavatus, Phragmolites fimbriata, Phragmolites girvanensis, Phragmolites huoliensis, Phragmolites hyperboreus, Phragmolites imbricata, Phragmolites lindstroemi, Phragmolites multinotatus, Phragmolites obliquus, Phragmolites pannosus, Phragmolites phaecus, Phragmolites sladensis, Phragmolites slawsoni, Phragmolites suarezi, Phragmolites triangularis

== See also ==
- List of marine gastropod genera in the fossil record
