= Strepsodiscus =

Strepsodiscus Temporal range: Late Cambrian

Scientific classification
- Kingdom: Animalia
- Phylum: Mollusca
- Class: Gastropoda (?)
- Order: †Bellerophontida
- Family: †Tropidodiscidae
- Genus: †Strepsodiscus

Extinct genus of molluscs

Strepsodiscus is an extinct genus of very primitive fossil snail-like molluscs from the early part of the Late Cambrian (Dresbachian Age) of North America. The coiled, slightly asymmetrical shells are about 3 mm in height. It is not known whether these are shells of gastropods (sea snails) or monoplacophorans, which are more primitive mollusks.

Bouchet & Rocroi (2005) divide the Bellerophontoidea into 8 families listed Paleozoic molluscs with isostrophically coiled shells of uncertain position within Mollusca (Gastropoda or Monoplacophora)

Knight, et al., 1960 included this genus within the Cyrtolitidae, a paraphyletic or polyphyletic assemblage of proto-gastropods and Tergomyan molluscs. Strepsodiscus may be too primitive to be a true gastropod.

== Species ==
Species within the genus Strepsodiscus are as follows:

- Strepsodiscus major
- S. minutissimus
- S. paucivoluta
- S. splettstoesseri
- S. strongi
