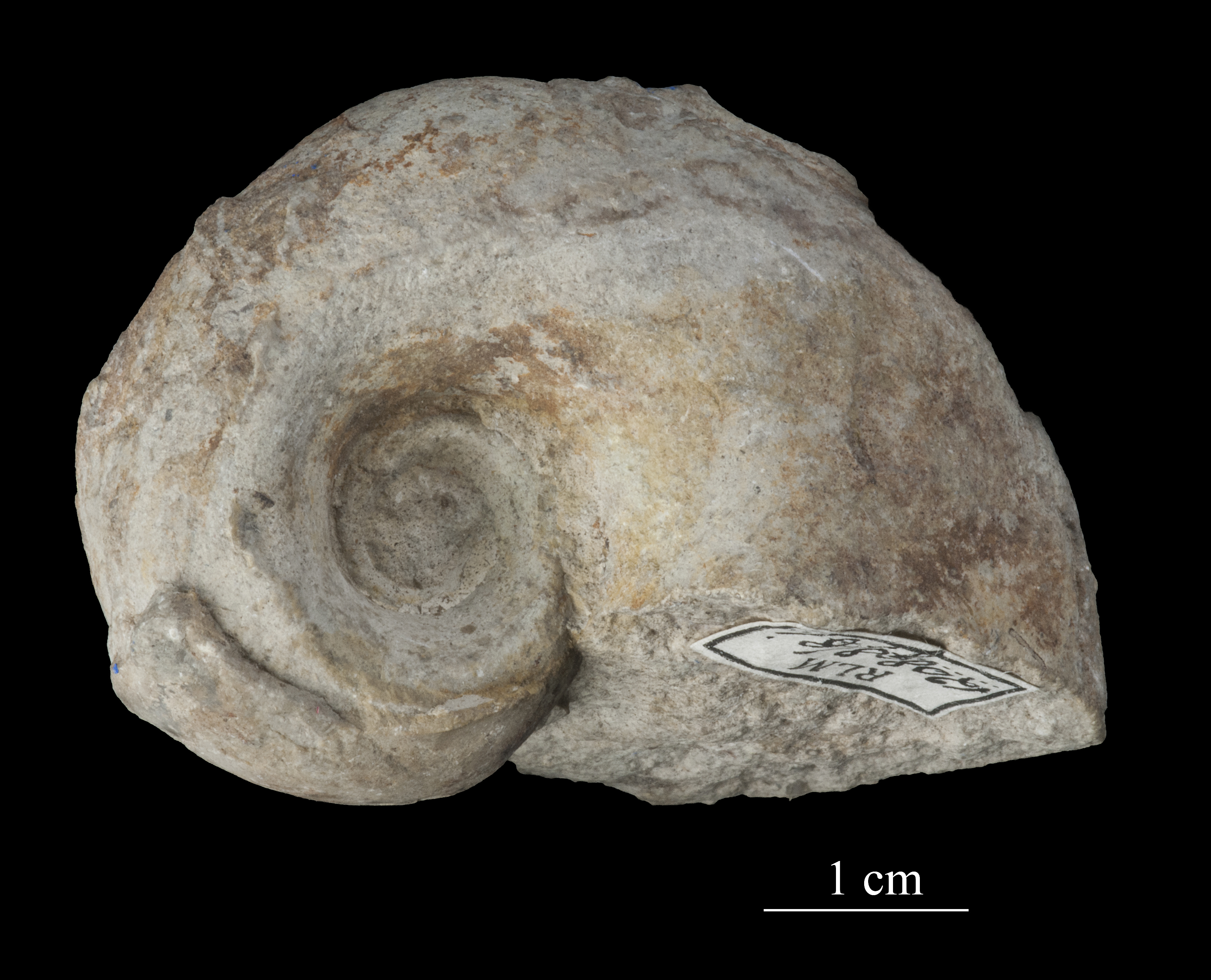
- A specimen of Bucaniidae at the Estonian Museum of Natural History

Scientific classification
- Kingdom: Animalia
- Phylum: Mollusca
- Class: Gastropoda (?)
- Order: †Bellerophontida
- Superfamily: †Bellerophontoidea
- Family: †Bucaniidae; Ulrich & Scofield, 1897

Subfamilies
- See text

= Bucaniidae =

Bucaniidae Temporal range: Lower Ordovician - Devonian

Extinct family of molluscs

Bucaniidae is an extinct family of Paleozoic molluscs of uncertain position possibly being either gastropods or monoplacophorans in the superfamily Bellerophontoidea. The family lived from the Lower Ordovician to the Devonian and have shells in which the apertural margins tend to flare. Most genera have a slit and selenizone, others some modification of this feature.

== Taxonomy ==
The taxonomy of the Gastropoda by Bouchet & Rocroi, 2005 categorizes Bucaniidae in the superfamily Bellerophontoidea, within the Paleozoic molluscs of uncertain systematic position with isostrophically coiled shells (Gastropoda or Monoplacophora).

J.B. Knight et al, in 1960 included the bucaniids in the Bellerophontidae as the subfamily Bucaniinae, and considered them true gastropods belonging to the prosobranch order, Archaeogastropoda, giving evidence that embryonic torson is not the cause of asymmetric coiling of typical gastropod shells. Physiologic restriction points to the viscera being turned 180 degrees with the gills and anus to the front and the aperture positioned to best facilitate retreat inward by the head and foot.

The Trestise Part I divided the Bucaniinae into two tribes, the Bucaniides, in which the exhalent emargination is a short slit, and the Salpingostoma in which the exhalent orifice consists of one or more holes in series, known as trema.

Bouchet & Rocroi, (2005) have elevated the tribes Bucaniides and Salpingostoma to the subfamilies Bucaniinae and Salpingostomatinae. They added the subfamilies, Undulabucaniinae and Plectonotinae which includes the tribes Plectonotini and Boucotonotini.

== Genera ==
Genera in the family Bucaniidae include:

- Bucania Hall, 1847 - type genus Ordovician and Silurian.
- Salpingostoma Roemer, 1876 Ordovician and Silurian.
- †Phragmolites Conrad 1838

(incomplete list)

== Original description ==
Family Bucaniidae was originally described by Ulrich and Scofield in 1897.

The type description reads as follows:

Symmetric, involute shells; whorls rather numerous, merely in contact, or embracing slightly, all visible in the umbilicus; aperture often expanded abruptly; dorsal slit-band distinct, the slit itself generally very long and narrow, sometimes represented by a row of openings; surface with transverse lamellae or lines, usually crossed at right angles by short ribs.
