= Bellerophontidae =

Bellerophontidae Temporal range: Furongian–Early Triassic (Possible Anisian records)
- Bucanopsis leda (subfamily Bucanopsinae)

Scientific classification
- Kingdom: Animalia
- Phylum: Mollusca
- Class: Gastropoda (?)
- Order: †Bellerophontida
- Superfamily: †Bellerophontoidea
- Family: †Bellerophontidae; McCoy, 1852

Subfamilies and genera
- see text.

Extinct family of gastropods

The Bellerophontidae are an extinct family of specialized globose bellerophontids, Paleozoic and early Triassic mollusks of the class Gastropoda.

== Geological range ==
These mollusks appeared in the Late Cambrian and continued until the Early Triassic.

== Shell description ==
The shell resembles a miniature Nautilus, with greatly overlapping, rounded whorls, in which the last whorl completely encompasses the others, leaving either a very narrow umbilicus on either side, or none at all. At the aperture of the shell is a slit, which results in a sort of low ridge that runs along the length of shell. The shell has a low profile and these possibly were active, fast-moving molluscs.

== Taxonomy ==
=== 1960 taxonomy ===
Knight et al. 1960 in the Treatise on Invertebrate Paleontology consider the Bellerophontidae a very large family made up of a number of subfamilies and tribes.

The 1960 classification places the family Bellerophontidae in the order Bellerophontida Ulrich & Scofield, 1897.

The classification presented is:

Order Bellerophontida Ulrich & Scofield, 1897

- Family Bellerophontidae McCoy, 1851
  - Subfamily Tropidodiscinae Knight, 1956
  - Subfamily Bucaniinae Ulrich & Scofield, 1897

  - Tribe Bucaniides Ulrich & Scofield, 1897
  - Tribe Salpingostomatides Koken, 1925

  - Subfamily Carinaropsinae Ulrich & Scofield, 1897
  - Subfamily Pterothecinae Wenz, 1938
  - Subfamily Bellerophontinae McCoy, 1851
  - Subfamily Knightitinae Knight, 1956

=== 2001 taxonomy ===
Recently, Peter J. Wagner presented cladograms which divide this assemblage into a number of different groups, as well as combining the Bellerophontidae with the family Sinuitidae. while Bouchet & Rocroi (2005) places Sinuitidae as a family in superfamily Bellerophontoidea.

=== 2005 taxonomy ===
The taxonomy of the Gastropoda by Bouchet & Rocroi, 2005 categorizes Bellerophontidae like this:

- Paleozoic molluscs of uncertain systematic position
  - Paleozoic molluscs with isostrophically coiled shells of uncertain position within Mollusca (Gastropoda or Monoplacophora)
    - superfamily Bellerophontoidea McCoy, 1852 - Bellerophontoidea is the only superfamily in this taxon.
      - family Bellerophontidae McCoy, 1852
        - subfamily Bellerophontinae McCoy, 1852 - synonym: Liljevallospiridae Golikov & Starobogatov, 1889
        - subfamily Bucanopsinae Wahlman, 1992
        - subfamily Cymbulariinae Horný, 1963
        - subfamily Knightitinae Knight, 1956

Bouchet & Rocroi, on page 271 (2005), also state that the assignation of "symmetrical univalved mollusks "bellerophonts" either to Gastropoda or to Monoplacophora or Tergomya is controversial." In other words, it is not yet certain whether bellerophonts are in fact real gastropods, they might be monoplacophorans or they might belong to a group (Tergomya) that is closely related to the gastropods, but not actually gastropods.

== Genera ==
Genera in the family Bellerophontidae include:

- subfamily Bellerophontinae
  - genus Bellerophon Montfort, 1808 - type genus of the subfamily Bellerophontinae
- subfamily Bucanopsinae
  - genus Bucanopsis Ulrich, 1897 - type genus of the subfamily Bucanopsinae
- subfamily Cymbulariinae
  - genus Cymbularia Koken, 1896 - type genus of the subfamily Cymbulariinae
- subfamily Knightitinae
  - genus Knightites Moore, 1941 - type genus of the subfamily Knightitinae

other genera include:

- Aglaoglypta
- Liljevallospira
- Pharkidonotus
- Prosoptychus
- Ptychobellerophon
- Ptychosphaera
