= Helcionellacea =

Scientific classification
- Kingdom: Animalia
- Phylum: Mollusca
- Class: Gastropoda (?)
- Order: †Bellerophontida
- Superfamily: †Helcionellacea; Wenz, 1938

Extinct superfamily of gastropods

The Helcionellacea is one of two taxonomic superfamilies of extinct primitive marine molluscs within the order Bellerophontida. This superfamily is thought to be the more primitive of the two superfamilies, the other being the Bellerophontacea. These molluscs are thought to be sea snails, marine gastropod mollusks, rather than monoplacophorans.

== Diagnosis ==
Helcionellaceans are characterised by cap-shaped to bellerophontiform shells; commonly with strong rugae, (transverse plications) clearly defined on both the interior and exterior of the shell; with a septum or septa partitioning off the apex, but lacking the anal emargination that is characteristic of the Bellerophontacea.

== Taxonomy ==
The Helcionellacea includes two families according to the Treatise, 1960, the Helcionellidae, which is the more primitive, and the Coreospiridae, which is the more derived.

The Helconellidae (Wenz, 1938) represented by the genus Helcionella (Grabau & Shimer, 1909) more closely resembles the monoplacophoran ancestor, and is characterized by elongate cap-shaped shells.

The Coreospiridae (Knight, 1947) which includes Coreospira (Satto, 1936) Cycloholcus (Knight, 1947) and Latouchella (Cobbold, 1921) are more bellerophontiform (shaped like a bellerophont). Latauchella has the least amount of apical coiling, and more closely resembles species of Helcionella. Coreospira is tightly coiled while Cycloholcus is open coiled. Both bear some resemblance to the genus Cloudia in the Cyrtolitidae, Bellerophontacea.

Wagner (2011) reassigned the Helcionellacea (alternatively Helcionelloidea) to the Helcionellida with the following families, Helcionellidae, Garkielladae, and Procarinaridae. Parkhaev 2002 added the Igarkiellidae and expanded the Coreospiridae and Helcionellidae with additional genera.

The Procarinaridae, represented by Procarinaria from the Upper Silurian of Italy and the Czech Republic, was tentatively included in the Cyrolitidae by Knight et al., 1960, and this taxon may or may not belong instead to the Helcionellacea. The stratigraphic gap of the intervening Ordovician suggests otherwise.
