= Euphemitidae =

Scientific classification
- Kingdom: Animalia
- Phylum: Mollusca
- Class: Gastropoda (?)
- Order: †Bellerophontida
- Superfamily: †Bellerophontoidea
- Family: †Euphemitidae; Knight, 1956

Genera
- see text.

Extinct family of gastropods

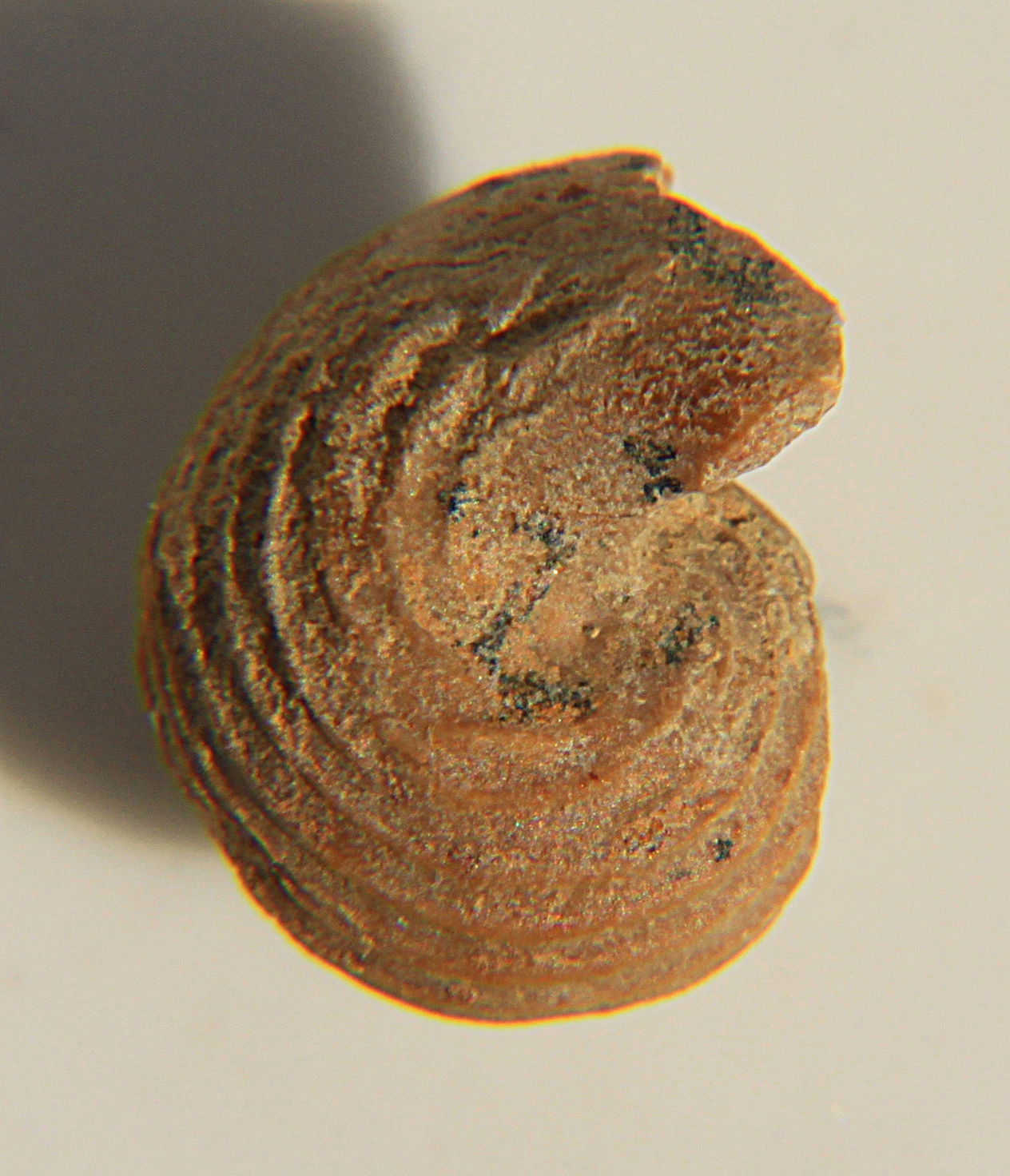

Euphemitidae is an extinct family of Paleozoic fossil molluscs of uncertain position. They have isostrophically coiled shells and may be either Gastropoda sea (snail)s, or Monoplacophora.

== Taxonomy ==
The taxonomy of the Gastropoda by Bouchet & Rocroi, 2005 categorizes Euphemitidae in the superfamilia Bellerophontoidea within the Paleozoic molluscs of uncertain systematic position with isostrophically coiled shells (Gastropoda or Monoplacophora).

This family consists of the following subfamilies (according to the taxonomy of the Gastropoda by Bouchet & Rocroi, 2005):

- Euphemitidae Knight, 1956
- Paleuphemitinae Frýda, 1999

== Genera ==
Genera in the family Euphemitidae include:

- Euphemites Warthin, 1930 - the type genus of the family Euphemitidae
