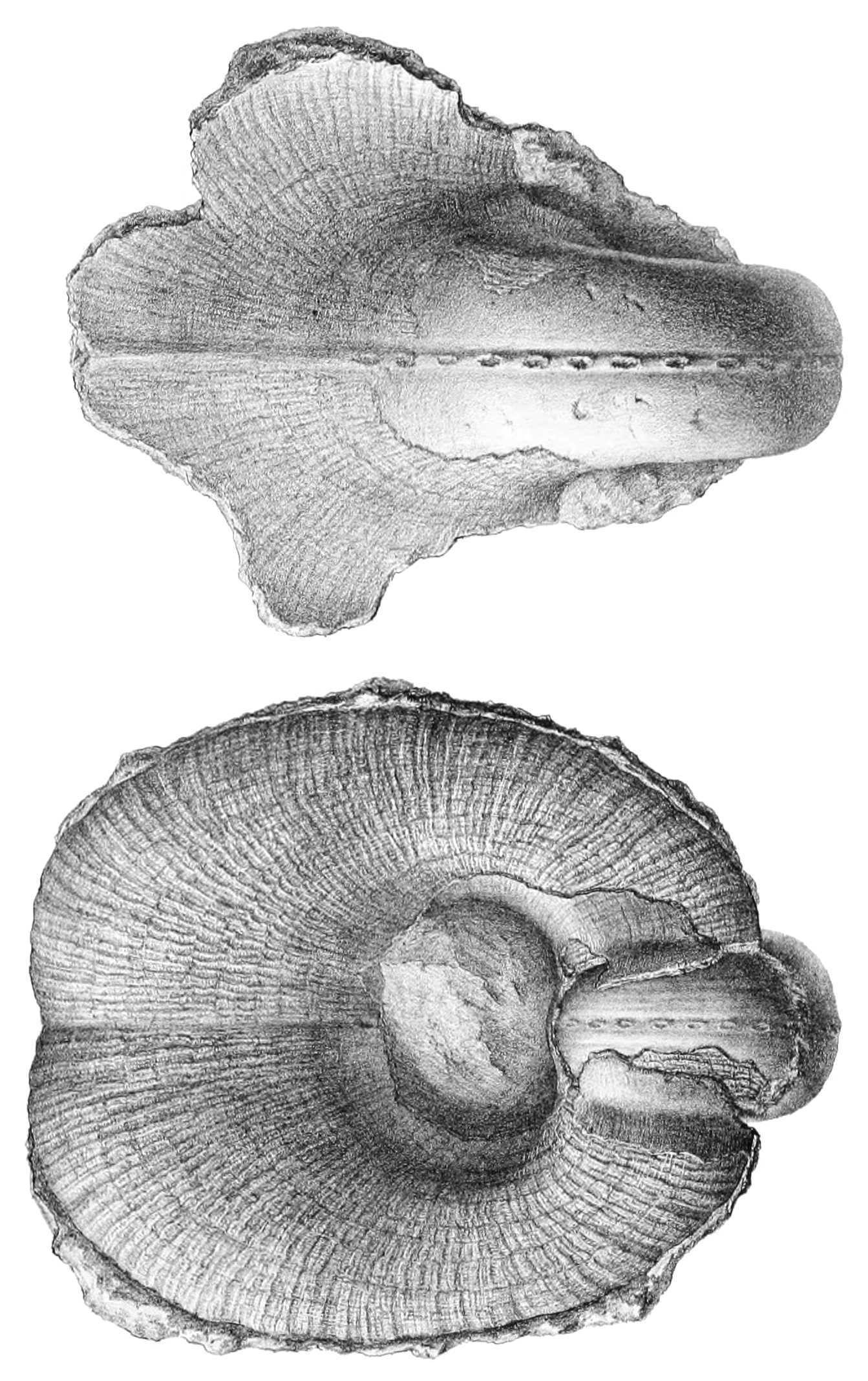
- Drawing of dorsal view and ventral view of the shell of Boiotremus longitudinalis. Head region is on the left.

Scientific classification
- Kingdom: Animalia
- Phylum: Mollusca
- Class: Gastropoda (?)
- Order: †Bellerophontida
- Superfamily: †Bellerophontoidea
- Family: †Tremanotidae; Naef, 1913

Genera
- See text

= Tremanotidae =

Extinct family of gastropods

Tremanotidae is an extinct family of Paleozoic fossil molluscs with isostrophically coiled shells. They occupy an uncertain position taxonomically: it is not known whether they were (gastropods (snails) or monoplacophorans.

== Taxonomy ==
The taxonomy of the Gastropoda by Bouchet & Rocroi, 2005 categorizes Tremanotidae in the superfamilia Bellerophontoidea within the Paleozoic molluscs of uncertain systematic position with isostrophically coiled shells (Gastropoda or Monoplacophora). This family has no subfamilies.

== Genera ==
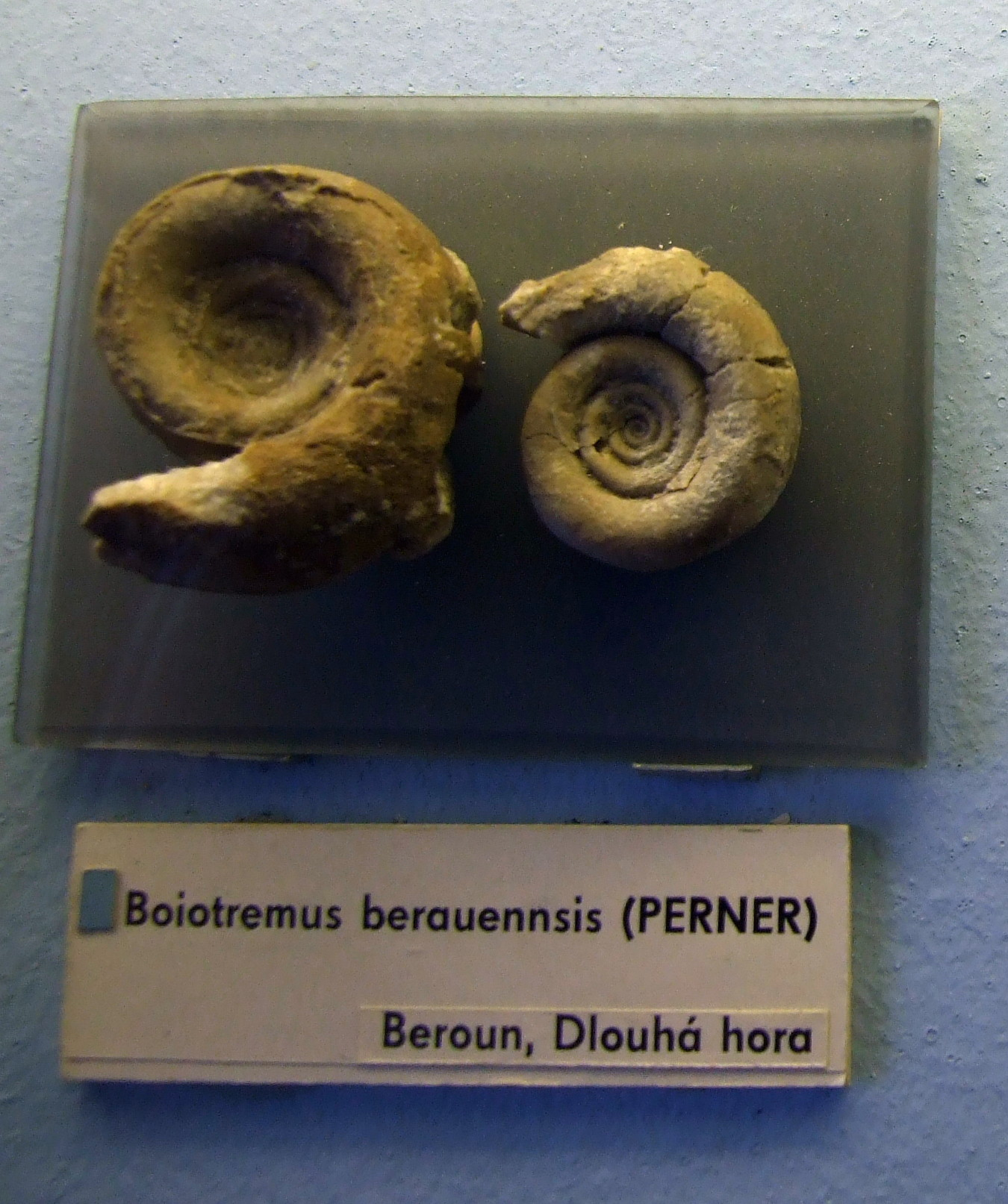
Boiotremus berauennsis.

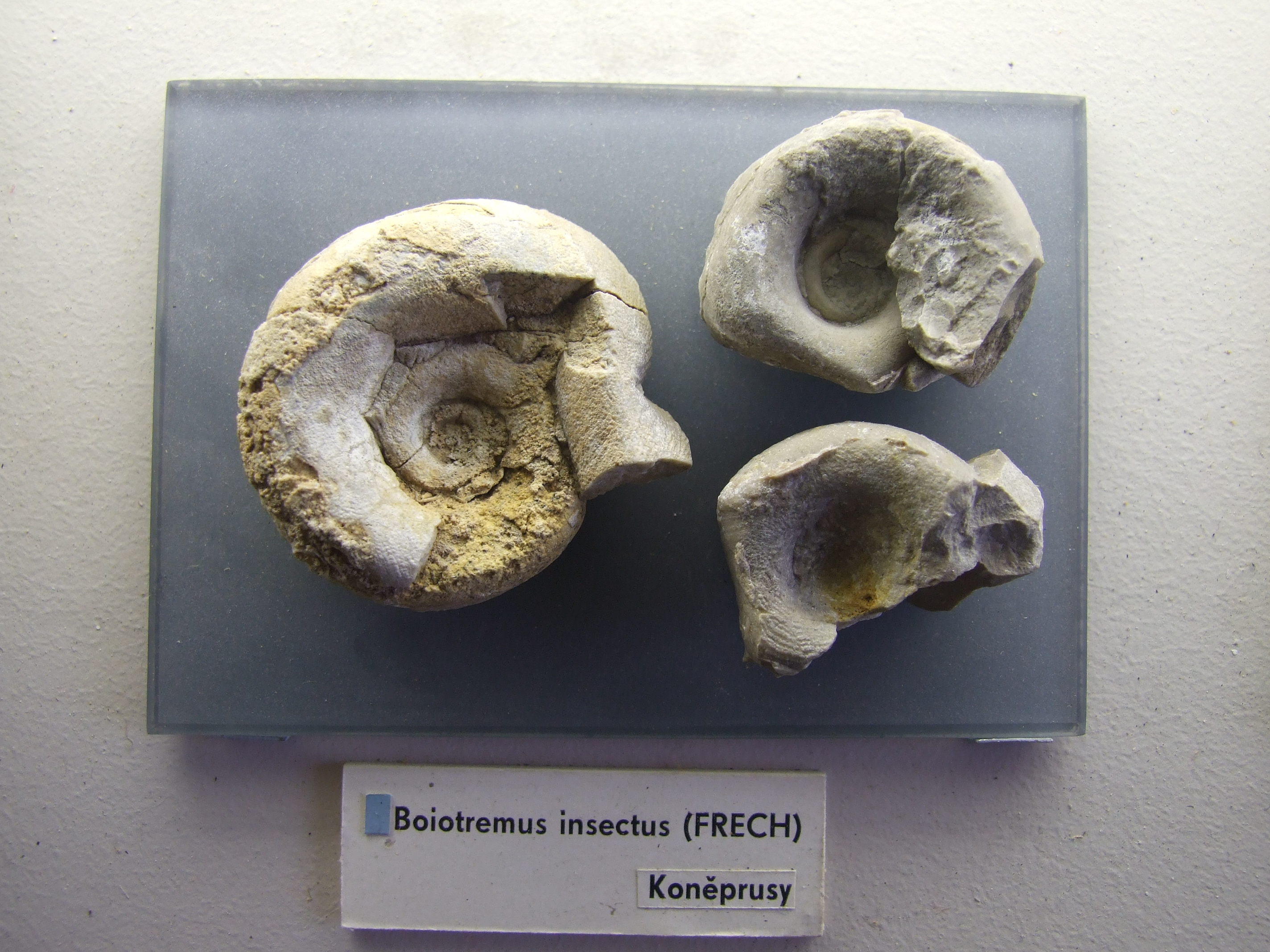
Goniotremus insectus.

Genera in the family Tremanotidae include:

- Tremanotus Hall, 1867 - type genus of the family Tremanotidae. Synonyms: Gyrotrema, Tremagyrus.
  - Tremanotus angustata - synonym: Tremanotus alpheus.
  - Tremanotus aymestriensis
  - Tremanotus chicagoensis
  - Tremanotus civis
  - Tremanotus compressus
  - Tremanotus crassolare
  - Tremanotus cyclocostatus
  - Tremanotus deficiens
  - Tremanotus dilatatus - synonym: Tremanotus girvanensis.
  - Tremanotus inopinata
  - Tremanotus minutus
  - Tremanotus nautiloidea
  - Tremanotus nobile
  - Tremanotus parvus
  - Tremanotus pervoluta
  - Tremanotus planorbis
  - Tremanotus plicosum
  - Tremanotus polygyratus
  - Tremanotus portlocki
  - Tremanotus pritchardi
  - Tremanotus serpentinus
  - Tremanotus trigonostoma
  - Tremanotus tuboides
- Boiotremus Horný, 1962
  - Boiotremus beraunensis
  - Boiotremus caelatus
  - Boiotremus distans
  - Boiotremus fortis
  - Boiotremus kosovensis
  - Boiotremus longitudinalis (Lindström, 1884) - synonyms: Tremanotus longitudinalis, Tremanotus incipiens
- Goniotremus Horný, 1992
  - Goniotremus insectus - synonym: Goniotremus polygonus.
  - Goniotremus involutus
