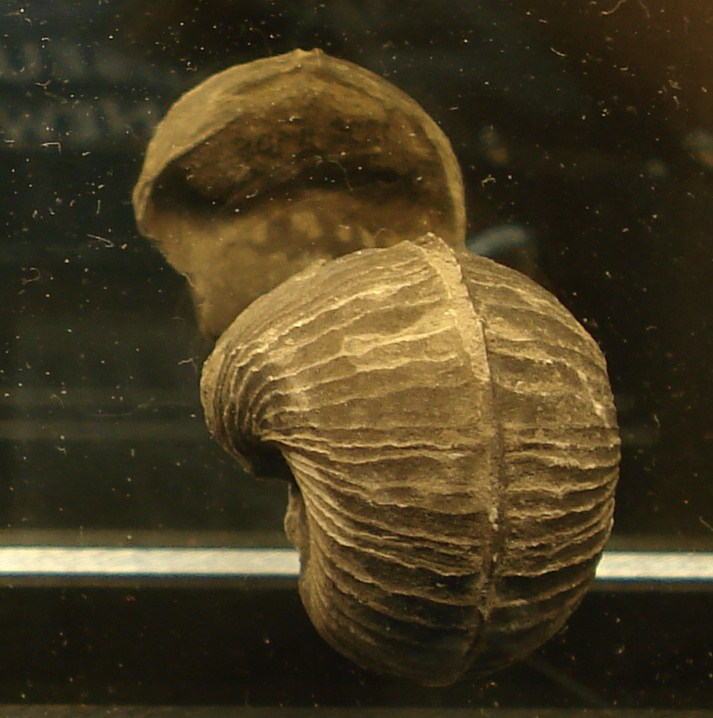
- Bellerophon umbilicalis.

Scientific classification
- Kingdom: Animalia
- Phylum: Mollusca
- Class: Gastropoda (?)
- Order: †Bellerophontida
- Family: †Bellerophontidae
- Genus: †Bellerophon; Montfort, 1808

Synonyms
- Carinaropsis (Bellerophon) (alternative spelling)

= Bellerophon (genus) =

Bellerophon Temporal range: Silurian–Early Triassic

Extinct genus of gastropods

Bellerophon is a genus of extinct marine molluscs of uncertain position (Gastropoda or Monoplacophora) in the family Bellerophontidae.

The genus was named after Bellerophon, the ancient Greek hero.

Bellerophon is the type genus of the family Bellerophontidae.

== Shell description ==
The genus is characterised by a shell which is globose, convolute, and planispiral (symmetrically coiled). The shell of Bellerophon superficially resembles that of a miniature cephalopod (e.g. Nautilus or an ammonite), except that septa are lacking.

The shell of Bellerophon is often a couple of centimeters in maximum dimension. The external surface is smooth, ornamented only by growth lines. There is a low crest or ridge running along the midline of the shell.

Many specimens of Bellerophon show something resembling a "waterline" about halfway up the shell, suggesting that a large amount of the mantle and foot were exposed and covered the outside of the shell, as in the extant Cypraeidae and Naticidae.

== Possible life habits ==
These animals were probably quick moving (for gastropods), relying on speed to avoid predators and, when this was not possible, withdrawing deeply into the shell.

== Range of distribution ==
The genus occurs worldwide, and is known from the Silurian to the Early Triassic periods.

== Taxonomy ==
Although usually classified as a primitive gastropod, there is a minority view that the Bellerophontida actually represented a more primitive, untorted type of mollusk, (see Torsion) which evolved a spiral shell independently. Another view is that some Bellerophontids, including Bellerophon, were torted gastropods, but that others were untorted forms.

== Species ==
Species within the genus Bellerophon include:

subgenus Bellerophon

- Bellerophon needlensis - from Late Mississippian from Utah
- Bellerophon welshi - from Late Mississippian from Utah

subgenus ?

- Bellerophon bicarenus Lévillé from early Carboniferous
- Bellerophon graphicus Moore from the late Pennsylvanian (Virgilian) of Kansas
- Bellerophon regularis (Waagen) from the Permian of India
- Bellerophon vasulites Montfort - the type species, from the Middle Devonian of Germany
- and others
