= Euphemites =

Euphemites Temporal range: Middle Devonian–Early Triassic

Scientific classification
- Kingdom: Animalia
- Phylum: Mollusca
- Class: Gastropoda (?)
- Order: †Bellerophontida
- Family: †Euphemitidae
- Subfamily: †Euphemitinae
- Genus: †Euphemites; Warthin, Jr., 1930

Species
- See text

Extinct genus of gastropod

Euphemites is an extinct genus of gastropod belonging to order Bellerophontida and family Euphemitidae. They may have been among the first burrowing gastropods.

== Species ==
- E. blaneanus McChesney
- E. inspeciosus White
- E. nodocarinatus Hall
- E. vittatus McChesney
