= Bucanellidae =

Bucanellidae Temporal range: Upper Cambrian - Middle Permian

Scientific classification
- Kingdom: Animalia
- Phylum: Mollusca
- Class: Gastropoda (?)
- Order: †Bellerophontida
- Superfamily: †Bellerophontoidea
- Family: †Bucanellidae; E. Koken, 1925

Genera
- See text

Extinct family of gastropods

Bucanellidae is an extinct family of Paleozoic molluscs of uncertain position, belonging either to Gastropoda (snails) or Monoplacophora. The family lived from the upper Cambrian to middle Permian and the shells are characterized by a relatively small median sinus in the upper margin of the aperture, and collabral (transverse) or spiral (longitudinal) threads covering the shell. The shells are planispirally coiled (flat coiled) rather than trochospirally with a spire as is the case with most shelled gastropods.

== Taxonomy ==
Knight et al. 1960, in the Treatise on Invertebrate Paleontology, Part I includes the Bucanellidae in the Prosobranchia, recognizing them as true gastropods, but as the subfamily Bucanellinae within the family Sinuitidae.

The current gastropod taxonomy, taxonomy of the Gastropoda by Bouchet & Rocroi, 2005 leaves room for the Bucanellidae, and Bellerophontoidea as a whole, being either gastropods or monoplacophorans with isotrophically coiled shells, concern being whether torsion, considered diagnostic of true gastropods, took place in these animals.

== Genera ==
Genera in the family Bucanellidae include:

- Bucanella Meek, 1871 - type genus
- Crenistriella
- Ornatosinuitina
- Sinuitella
