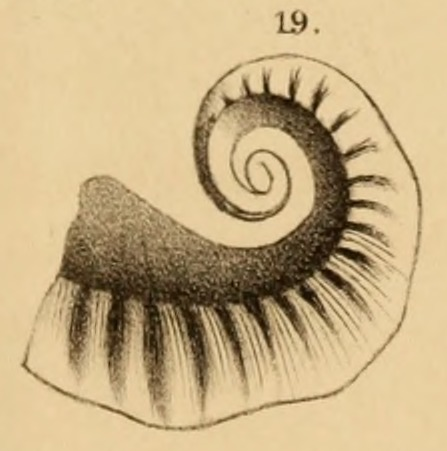
- Illustration of Cyrtolites sp.

Scientific classification
- Domain: Eukaryota
- Kingdom: Animalia
- Phylum: Mollusca
- Class: Monoplacophora
- Order: †Cyrtonellida
- Family: †Cyrtolitidae
- Genus: †Cyrtolites; Conrad, 1838

Species
- See text

Synonyms
- Bellerophon (Cyrtolites)

= Cyrtolites =

Cyrtolites Temporal range: 488.3–383.7 Ma

Extinct genus of molluscs

Cyrtolites is an extinct genus of monoplacophorans in the family Cyrtolitidae.

Names brought to synonymy

- Cyrtolites elegans S.A. Miller 1874, a synonym for Phragmolites elegans

== Subtaxa ==
Subgenera

- Cyrtolites (Cyrtolites)
- Cyrtolites (Cyrtonella)

Species

Cyrtolites budleighensis, Cyrtolites claysferryensis, Cyrtolites craigensis, Cyrtolites dilatus, Cyrtolites disjunctus, Cyrtolites grandis, Cyrtolites hornyi, Cyrtolites inornatum, Cyrtolites inprobus, Cyrtolites insculptus, Cyrtolites nodosus, Cyrtolites occultus, Cyrtolites ornatus (type), Cyrtolites retrorsus, Cyrtolites rugosus, Cyrtolites seminulum, Cyrtolites sinuosus, Cyrtolites thraivensis, Cyrtolites trentonensis, Cyrtolites tuboides, Cyrtolites undulatus
