= Pterothecidae =

Scientific classification
- Kingdom: Animalia
- Phylum: Mollusca
- Class: Gastropoda (?)
- Order: †Bellerophontida
- Superfamily: †Bellerophontoidea
- Family: †Pterothecidae; P. Fischer, 1883

Genera
- See text

Extinct family of gastropods

Pterothecidae is an extinct family of Paleozoic molluscs of uncertain position, either Gastropoda or Monoplacophora, with isostrophically coiled shells.

== Taxonomy ==
The taxonomy of the Gastropoda by Bouchet & Rocroi, 2005 categorizes Pterothecidae in the superfamily Bellerophontoidea within the Paleozoic molluscs of uncertain systematic position with isostrophically coiled shells (Gastropoda or Monoplacophora).

This family consists of the following subfamilies (according to the taxonomy of the Gastropoda by Bouchet & Rocroi, 2005):

- Pterothecinae P. Fischer, 1883
- Carinaropsinae Ulrich & Scofiled, 1897
- Pedasiolinae Wahlman, 1992

== Genera ==
Genera in the family Pterothecidae include:

- Pterotheca Salter, 1852 - type genus of the family Pterothecidae
