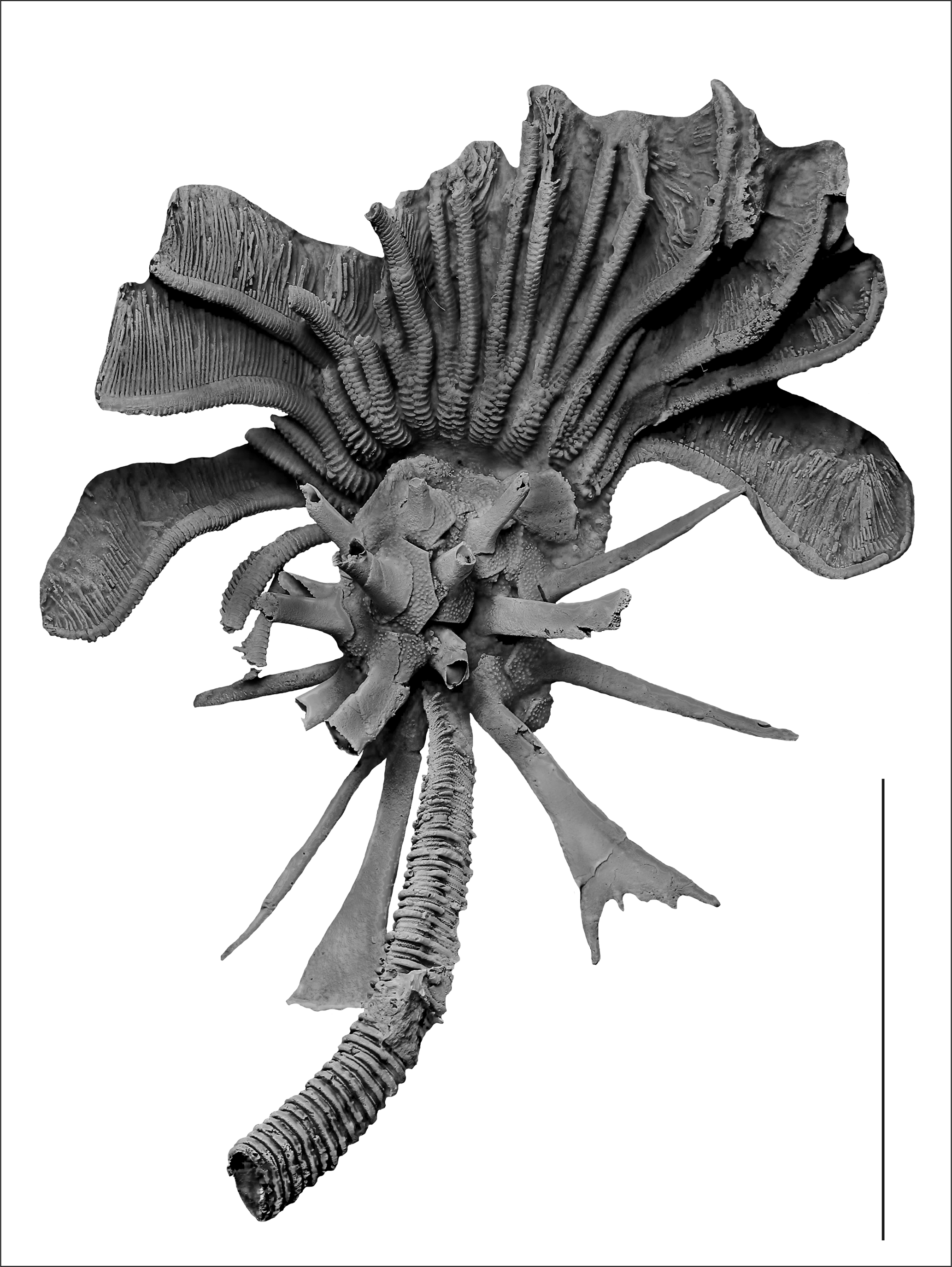
- Specimen of M. granosus (NHMMZ PWL 2021/6145-LS). Scale bar = 3 cm

Scientific classification
- Kingdom: Animalia
- Phylum: Echinodermata
- Class: Crinoidea
- Order: †Diplobathrida
- Family: †Rhodocrinitidae
- Genus: †Monstrocrinus; Schmidt, 1941

Type species
- † Monstrocrinus securifer Schmidt, 1941

Species
- †M. securifer Schmidt, 1941 (type) †M. granosus Schmidt, 1941 †M. incognitus Scheffler, 2011

Synonyms
- Monstrocrinus aliformis Le Mann, 1990

= Monstrocrinus =

Monstrocrinus Temporal range: Upper Emsian–Upper Eifelian

Extinct genus of crinoids

Monstrocrinus is an extinct genus of stalked crinoid from the Lower to Middle Devonian, found in Brazil, Europe and, ambiguously, Algeria. It is most notable for the flattened spine structures that attach to its bowl-like calyx plates, at the base of its theca.

Traditionally, the genus was interpreted as a stalk-less free-living crinoid, drifting throughout substratum while its axe-like spines provided anchorage. However, this view was later challenged as re-examination of the original specimen revealed a previously unknown point of attachment for the column. From this a new mode of life was inferred, were the stalk would elevate the crown of the crinoid to the water, and the spines would serve as stabilizing fins, allowing the animal to maintain an efficient feeding posture in moving water. Water would move from where the theca meets the stalk towards the mouth, also passing through the arms.

== History of study ==
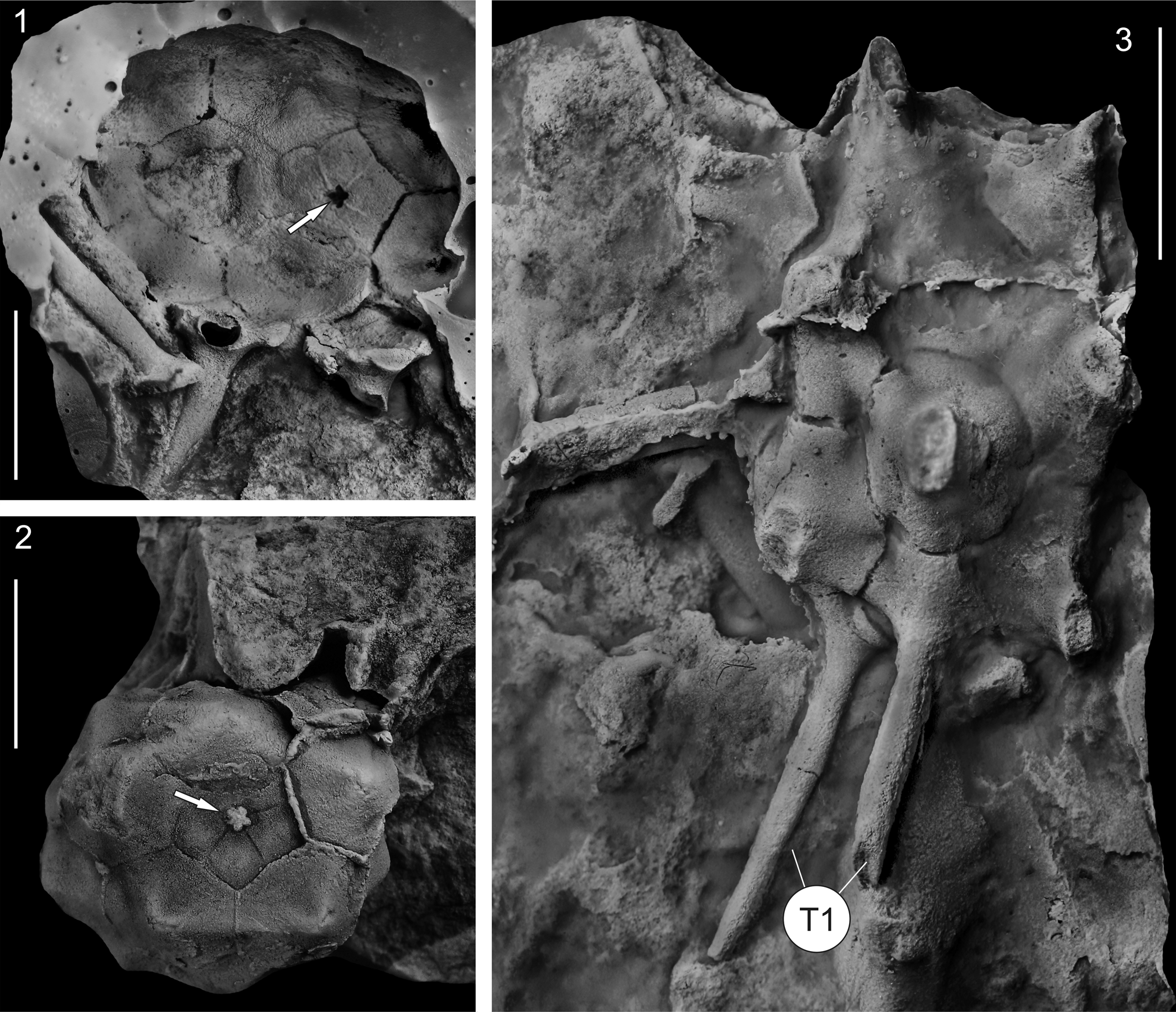
Recast holotype of M. securifer. In the figures 1 and 2 the arrow points towards the stalk canal, originally not noticed by Schmidt.

Schmidt (1941) described a genus of crinoid known from remains found in a former brickwork mine in Osterbachtal, in the modern-day German town of Arnsberg, Sauerland. He had previously cited the fossil in an earlier work, describing it as "with unusually monstrous, axe-shaped spines on the basals and radials", whence the name of the genus, Monstrocrinus. The original materials were disarticulated spines and calyx plates found in different localities. Even so, he used this material to describe the new genus. Schmidt originally interpreted this genus as a stalkless crinoid, passively drifting through the sea floor, while the "monstrous floating spines" aided in giving it stability. He explained the apparent absence of a stalk through the lack of a "stem scar" on the arboreal (lower) side of the calyx, where the opening would have been closed by the growth of the surrounding plate. He also assumed from the disarticulated arms of M. granosus that all specimens must have had short arms. However, both this and the interpretation of Monstrocrinus possessing no stalk would later be proven inaccurate. Schmidt named two species in his 1941 publication; the type species M. securifer, found on the sites around Olpe, North Rhine-Westphalia, and M. granosus, from the Mandeln Formation.

Le Mann (1990), described a single plate from the Pena Negra Formation of Loscos, Spain. This specimen has an elk-antler-like spine, which resulted in Le Mann describing this as the new species M. aliformis. He also hypothesised on the evolution of Monstrocrinus, writing that the spines of Acanthocrinus first evolved the forked spines of M. granosus, which later became the antler-like spines in M. aliformis. However, this new species would later be synonymised with M. securifer, meaning that this model has since become dated. Le Mann also wrote of two isolated calyx plates from the Chefar El Ahmar Formation of Algeria, identifying them as Monstrocrinus sp.. However, these specimens cannot be conclusively attributed to the genus.

Scheffler (2006) described a specimen of M. securifer from the Maecuru Formation of Northern Brazil, however this specimen would later be proposed to be M. incognatus or a new species. In 2009, Scheffler et al. described additional material representing the calyx and crown, which showed that the arms divided twice. In 2011, Scheffler et al. also described a new species, M. incognitus, from specimens found in the Pimenteira Formation of the Parnaíba Basin, Northeastern Brazil. According to the 2011 publication, the specific name derives from the Latin word "incognitus", meaning disguised or unknown, referring to the unusual genus and the difficult history of interpreting its paleoecology.

More recently, Bohatý et al. (2023) described a new, more complete specimen that had its stalk, spines and crown preserved, as well as re-examining the original specimens and the previously cited works. They discovered that the original holotype and paratypes actually do have a canal connecting to a stalk, which wasn't present in Schmidt's original illustrations, as well as parts of the disarticulated crown and parts of the stem, which were originally interpreted as belonging to another genus.

== Description ==
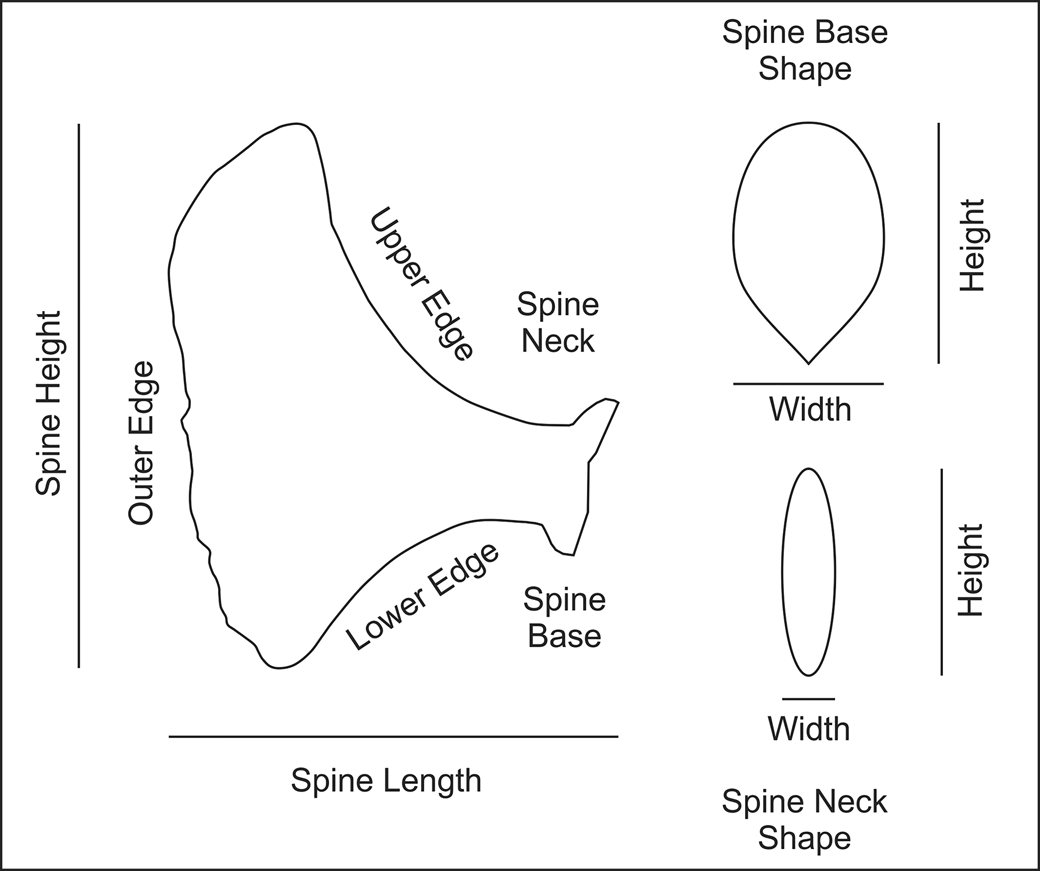
Morphological features of Monstrocrinus spines, utilised in classifying them.

The most distinctive characteristic in Monstrocrinus is its globe-shaped calyx, from which various types of spines attach to the calyx plates. The forms of the spines range from axe-like structures to bifurcated spines, to forked spines. In Bohatý et al. (2023), in order to describe the spines more accurately than earlier works, they devised a model that takes into consideration the width and height of the calyx plate, the length and height of the spine, the measurements of the cross-section of the neck of the spine (where it meets the plate), as well as the upper, lower and outer edges of the spine. With those measurements they were able to classify them into 8 types, with said types being further divided into categories A and B. In category A, the spine appear to be a part of the calyx plate, where as in category B they are merely attached to it. So for example, a Type 4b would be a "Broad paddle-shaped spine" attached to the plate. The arms of Monstrocrinus subdivide two times, meaning that it had a total of 20 arms.

Types of Monstrocrinus spines
Type	Name	Image
Type 1	Tapering, pointed spine.	
Type 2	Blunt spine.	
Type 3	Narrow paddle-shaped spine.	
Type 4	Broad paddle-shaped spine.	
Type 5	Flat, high fan.	
Type 6	Bifurcating spine.	
Type 7	Forked spine.	
Type 8	Strongly asymmetrical paddle-shaped spine with spinose outer margin.	

== Paleoecology ==
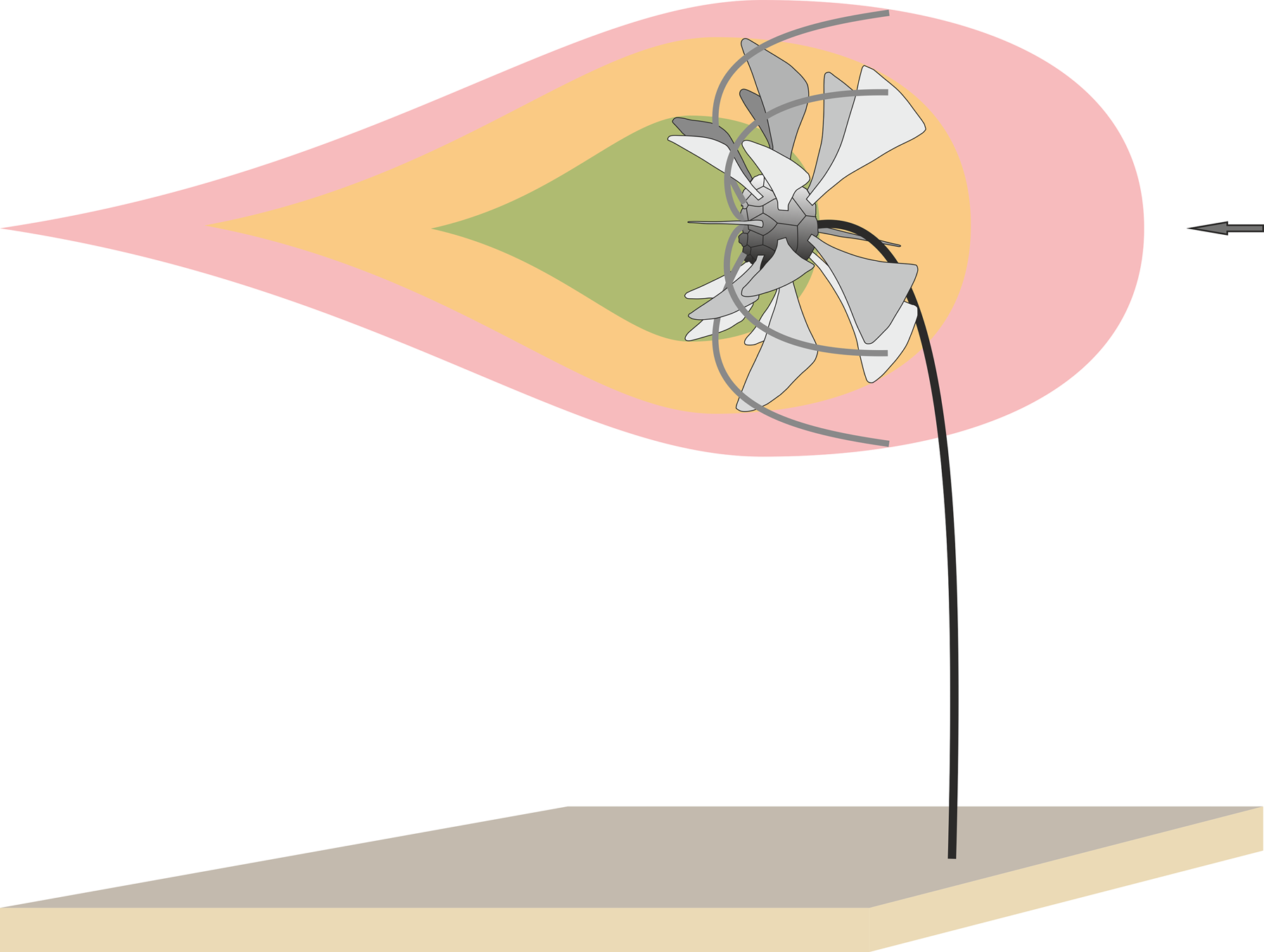
Schematic reconstruction of Monstrocrinus in feeding posture.

The traditional interpretation for the ecology of this genus was that of a free-living benthonic crinoid which would use its spines to anchor itself upon the marine sediment. This interpretation is, however, outdated, replaced with the modern interpretation that Monstrocrinus was a stalked echinoderm that attached itself to the sea floor. There are three hypothesis for the function of its long vertical spines. The first sees them as an anti-predation adaptation, which would be coherent with the predatory pressures these animals would be under during the Mid Paleozoic Marine Revolution. Evidences of non-lethal predation in this animal includes arms with signs of regrowth. The second hypothesis sees them as enhancing water currents that pass through the body, towards the mouth, creating eddying currents that would bring more nutrient-rich currents towards the mouth rather than just straight currents. The third hypothesis interprets the spines as an stabiliser for the crown when facing currents, as has been similarly suggested for another crinoid species, Pterotocrinus depressus.
