= Bifungites =

Trace fossil classification
- Ichnogenus: †Bifungites; Desio, 1940

Type ichnospecies
- Bifungites fezzanensis Desio, 1940

Ichnogenus of trace fossils

Bifungites is a dumbbell-shaped trace fossil predominately found in Paleozoic rocks from the Cambrian to the Mississippian, believed to be the burrows of extinct animals. A paper published in September 2024 reports the discovery of worms of genus Annulitubus in Bifungites in rocks from the Devonian Pimenteira Formation of Brazil, the first record of the creatures that created the burrows.
