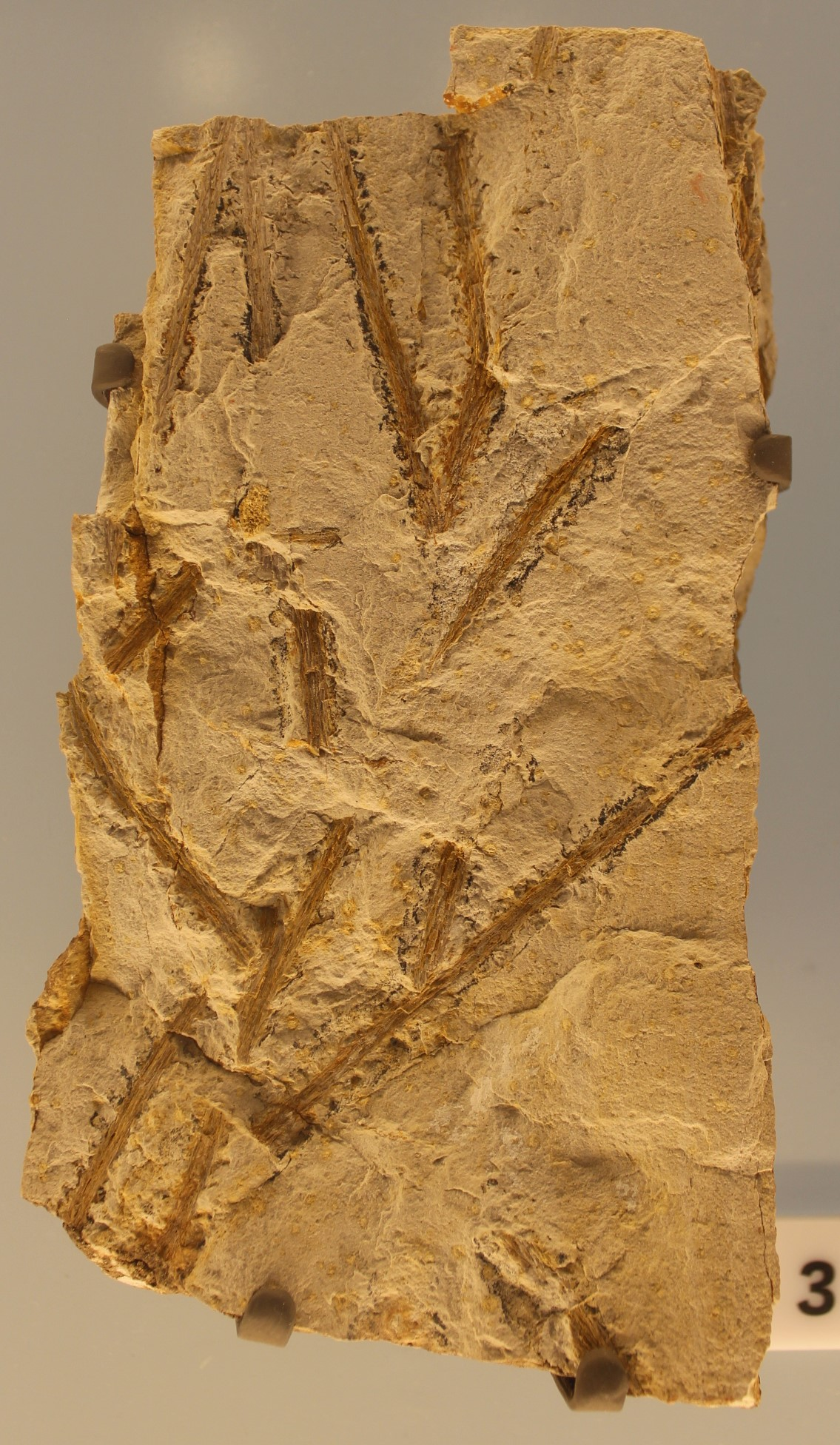
- L. complexa, National Museum of Natural History

Scientific classification
- Kingdom: Plantae
- Clade: Embryophytes
- Clade: Tracheophytes
- Clade: Lycophytes
- Class: Lycopodiopsida
- Order: †Protolepidodendrales
- Genus: †Leclercqia; H.P.Banks, Bonamo & Grierson (1973)

Species
- See text

= Leclercqia (plant) =

Leclercqia Temporal range: Middle Devonian

Extinct genus of spore-bearing plants

Leclercqia is a genus of early ligulate lycopsids (clubmosses), known as fossils from the Middle Devonian of Australia, North America, Germany, and Belgium. It has been placed in the Protolepidodendrales.

== Species ==
Distinct species include:

- Leclercqia scolopendra
- Leclercqia uncinata
- Leclercqia andrewsii

There has been question as to whether Leclercqia complexa is assigned to the correct genus; only a poorly preserved specimen exists.

Short lengths of compressed stems of Leclercqia are intermixed among several other plant types in this lens, including remains of Sawdonia ornata and Psilophyton sp. indet.
