= Protolepidodendropsis =

Scientific classification
- Kingdom: Plantae
- Clade: Tracheophytes
- Clade: Lycophytes
- Class: Lycopodiopsida
- Order: †Protolepidodendrales
- Family: †Protolepidodendraceae
- Genus: †Protolepidodendropsis; W. Gothan & F. Zimmermann, 1937

Extinct genus of spore-bearing plants

Protolepidodendropsis is a genus of lycopsid known from fossil forests dating from early Late Devonian strata in Svalbard.

Fossil forests of Protolepidodendropsis pulchra have been recovered from sandstone and mudstone of the Plantekløfta Formation, estimated to be around 380 million years old. The plants have trunks of up to 10 cm (4 in) width with flanged bases up to 20 cm (8 in) in diameter. Their height is unknown but estimated to be around 2 to 4 m. They grew 15–20 cm (6–8 in) apart in wet soils.
