= Spongiophytaceae =

Scientific classification
- Kingdom: Plantae
- Family: †Spongiophytaceae; Kräusel (1954)

Genera
- ?†Krupchenkella; ?†Tamarella; †Aculeophyton; †Orestovites; †Rhytidophyton; †Spongiophyton; †Voronejiphyton

Extinct family of Devonian organisms

The Spongiophytaceae are a grouping of early plant-like fossils from the Devonian, named after Spongiophyton. Its members may or may not be closely related.
