= Tropidodiscidae =

Scientific classification
- Kingdom: Animalia
- Phylum: Mollusca
- Class: Gastropoda (?)
- Order: †Bellerophontida
- Superfamily: †Bellerophontoidea
- Family: †Tropidodiscidae; Knight, 1956

Genera
- See text

Synonyms
- Temnodiscinae Horný, 1963

Extinct family of gastropods

Tropidodiscidae is an extinct family of Paleozoic fossil molluscs with isostrophically coiled shells. They are of uncertain position taxonomically, in other words it is not known whether they were (Gastropoda (snails) or Monoplacophora)s.

== Taxonomy ==
The taxonomy of the Gastropoda by Bouchet & Rocroi, 2005 categorizes Tropidodiscidae in the superfamilia Bellerophontoidea within the Paleozoic molluscs of uncertain systematic position with isostrophically coiled shells (Gastropoda or Monoplacophora). This family has no subfamilies.

== Genera ==
Genera in the family Tropidodiscidae include:

- Tropidodiscus Meek & Worthen, 1866 - type genus of the family Tropidodiscidae
