= Bellerophontoidea =

Bellerophontoidea Temporal range: Late Cambrian–Triassic
- Bucanopsis leda (family Bellerophontidae, subfamily Bucanopsinae)

Scientific classification
- Kingdom: Animalia
- Phylum: Mollusca
- Class: Gastropoda (?)
- Order: †Bellerophontida
- Superfamily: †Bellerophontoidea; McCoy, 1852

Families
- See text

Synonyms
- Bellerophontaceae Ulrich & Schofield, 1897

Extinct superfamily of gastropods

Bellerophontoidea, common name "bellerophonts", is a superfamily of extinct planospirally-coiled globose molluscs. This superfamily is generally included within the Gastropoda, but may instead be a group of monoplacophorans. The taxon first appeared late in the Cambrian and continued until late in the Triassic.

== Biology ==
Unlike normal gastropods, the shells of Bellerophonts are characterised by a completely planispiral pattern of coiling, such as one finds in shelled cephalopods. Experts disagree whether Bellerophontids should be classified as torted gastropods, or as untorted Tergomya, or whether the group Bellerophontida is perhaps an artificial construct, consisting of a number of distinct groups of Palaeozoic molluscs which evolved the same type of spiral shell independently.

J.B. Knight, et al. (1960) regarded the bellerophontids as torted gastropods even though they have essentially symmetrical, planispiral shells.

The narrower apex was probably held to the rear while the wider aperture was oriented to the front where the animal could easily emerge or retreat.

== Taxonomy ==
=== Historical background ===
The taxonomy of the Bellerophontoidea (renamed from the original Bellerophontacea) has gone through a number of revisions since M'Coy established the Bellerophontaceae in 1851 for planospiral archeogastropods. The naming followed the convention for superfamilies that prevailed until at least 1992 with Wahlman

The Bellerophontacea were placed in the order Bellerophontida established by Ulrich and Scofield in 1897 and included the families Bellerophontidae, Bucaniidae, Cyrtolitidae, and Protowarthiidae.

Knight, et al. 1960 (Treatise Part I reprinted 1989) discuss the Superfamily Bellerophontacea at some length and include within it the Bellerophontidae, Cyrtolitidae, Sinuopeidae and Tropidodiscidae.

=== 2005 Bellerophontid taxonomy ===
Bouchet et al. (2005) leaves the higher taxonomic position of the Bellerophontoidea as uncertain (Gastropoda or Monoplacophora) and divides the group into 8 families as listed:

- Bellerophontoidea
  - † Bellerophontidae
  - † Bucanellidae
  - † Bucaniidae
  - † Euphemitidae
  - † Pterothecidae
  - † Sinuitidae
  - † Tremanotidae
  - † Tropidodiscidae

The Bellerophontidae, Bucanitidae, Pterothacidae, and Tropododiscidae compare with the subfamilies Bellerophontinae, Bucanitinae, Pterothacinae, and Tropododiscinae included in the Bellerophontidae and the Bucanellidae, Euphemitidae, and Sinuitidae compare with the subfamilies Bucanellinae, Euphemitinae, and Sinuitinae included in the Sinuitidae, as found in the Treatise. The Tremanitiae is based on the genus Tremanotus which was included in the Bucanitinae in the Treatise.

Bouchet & Rocroi (2005) points out (page 271) that assignment of "symmetrical univalved mollusks "bellerophonts" either to Gastropoda or to Monoplacophora or Tergomya is controversial."

=== Note on nomenclature ===
Historically, the ending -ACEA, or -ACEAE, was more or less standard for superfamilies in invertebrate paleontology and zoology. Then the ICZN ruled that the ending -OIDEA should be used for superfamily names, where previously it was often used for subclasses and superorders.
