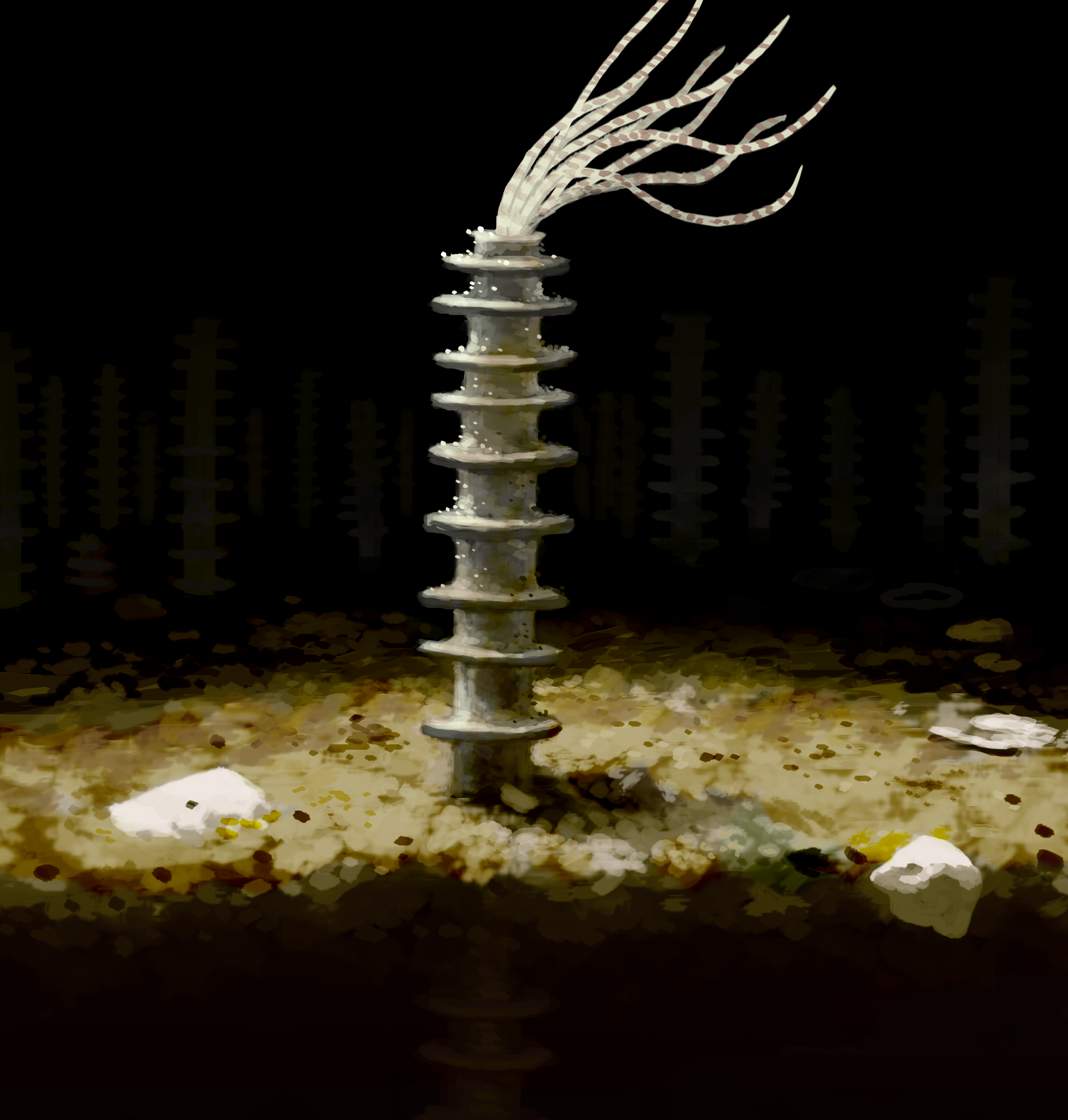
- Life reconstruction of Annulitubus fernandesi.

Scientific classification
- Kingdom: Animalia
- Phylum: Annelida
- Class: Polychaeta
- Order: incertae sedis
- Genus: †Annulitubus; Vinn et al., 2016

Type species
- † Annulitubus mutveii Vinn, 2016

Other species
- † A. fernandesi Scheffler, 2024

= Annulitubus =

Annulitubus Temporal range: Emsian to Middle Givetian, 390–384 Ma

Extinct genus of annelids

Annulitubus is an extinct genus of annelid from the Middle Devonian of Brazil. It has been found in both the Ponta Grossa Formation and the Pimenteira Formation of South and Northeastern Brazil respectively.

In life, it would probably have been an sedentary tube-dwelling polychaete, partially buried in substrate and subsisting by suspension-feeding.

== Etymology ==
The name Annulitubus derives from the Latin words 'annulus', meaning ring, and 'tubus', meaning tube. The type species, A. mutveii, is named in honour of Harry Mutvei for his work on the skeletal anatomy of various taxa, while A. fernandesi is named after Antonio Carlos Sequeira Fernandes, a paleontologist from the Museu Nacional, for his works on Brazilian paleoinvertebrates.

== Description ==
Fossils of Annulitubus are found in together, preserved in great numbers upwards of 170 individuals/meter². There are found preserved either in a horizontal pose, parallel to the bed forming pavements, or more rarely in a vertical pose, occurring just above the pavements and which would be how they would be orientated in life. The shape of their tubes are between straight and slightly curved with numerous disc-shaped rings along its side, the interspace between the discs being a smooth surface, between 0.69 and 1.1 mm in length, and without growth marks. In its life position, the preservation exhibits 25 rings per centimetre. Some specimens range from 12.66 to 13.80 mm in length.

== Paleoecology ==
Annulitubus would have lived in dense populations, buried head-up halfway through the substrate. Individuals were sedentary and would subsist by suspension-feeding. Based on fossil preservation, living individuals would settle on the pavement of dead Annulitubus, possibly using them to fix themselves in the sediment. This behavior is interpreted as positive taphonomic feedback, where the presence of dead individuals helps the colonisation by newer ones. In the Paraná Basin, A. mutveii was reported as living on offshore beds.

The exact taxonomic affinity of Annulitubus is still up for debate. Becker-Kerber et al. (2021) propose that it would pertain to the Maldanidae family, which are head-down orientated conveyor-belt deposit feeders, eating of the substrate and ejecting waste upwards. However, given that the fossils are preserved head-up, this is improbable. Another family put forward was Chaetopteridae, which more closely resembles this taxon.
