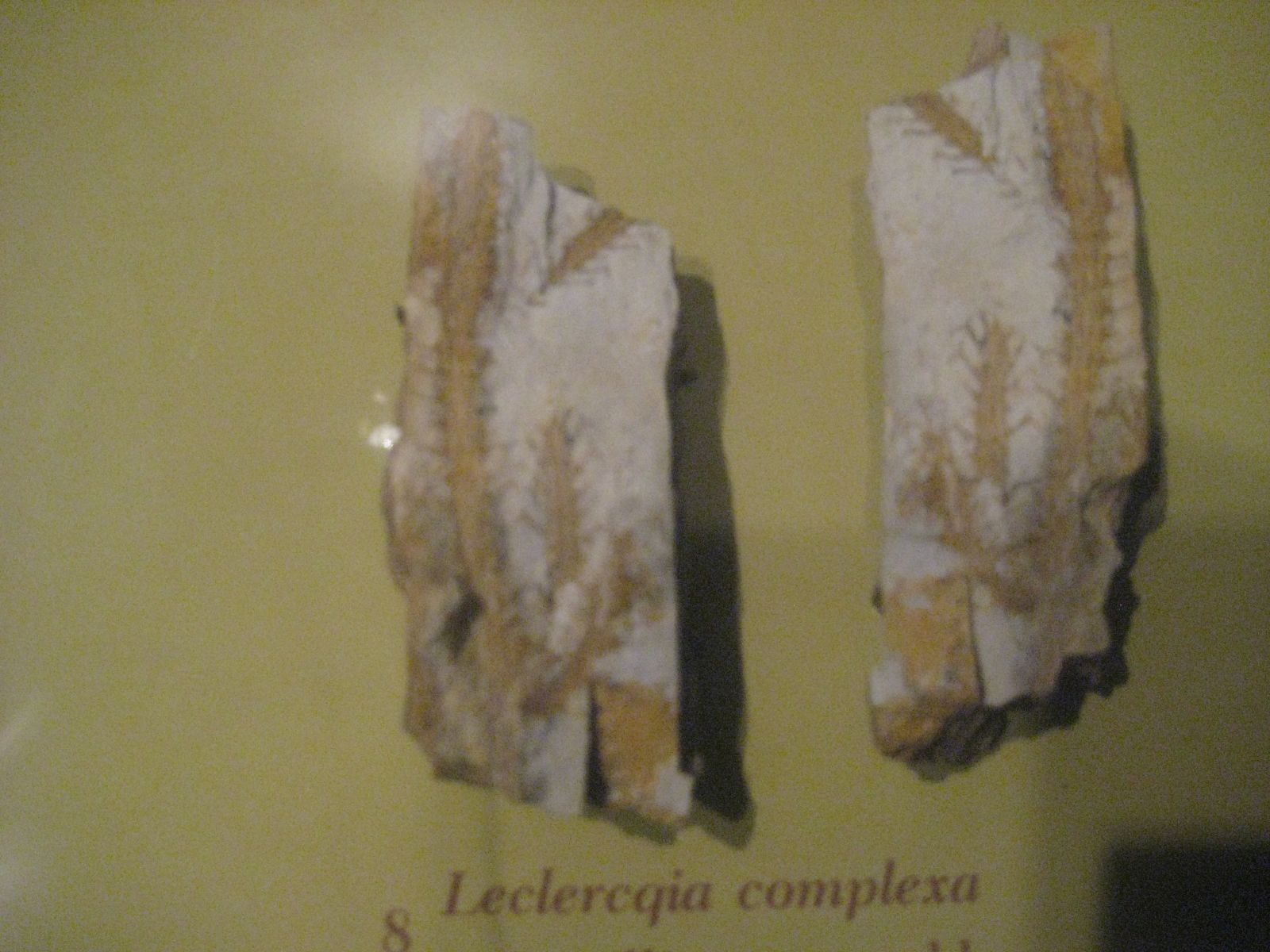
- Leclercqia complexa

Scientific classification
- Kingdom: Plantae
- Clade: Tracheophytes
- Clade: Lycophytes
- Class: Lycopodiopsida
- Order: †Protolepidodendrales

Families
- Protolepidodendraceae

= Protolepidodendrales =

Extinct order of spore-bearing plants

The Protolepidodendrales are an extinct order of lycopsids that flourished from the Devonian to the lower Carboniferous (Mississippian) periods.

Leclercqia is one of the best-known genera. Protolepidodendropsis is another genus included in this order.
