= Pimenteiras =

Coordinates: 6.245°S 41.4189°W

- Municipality
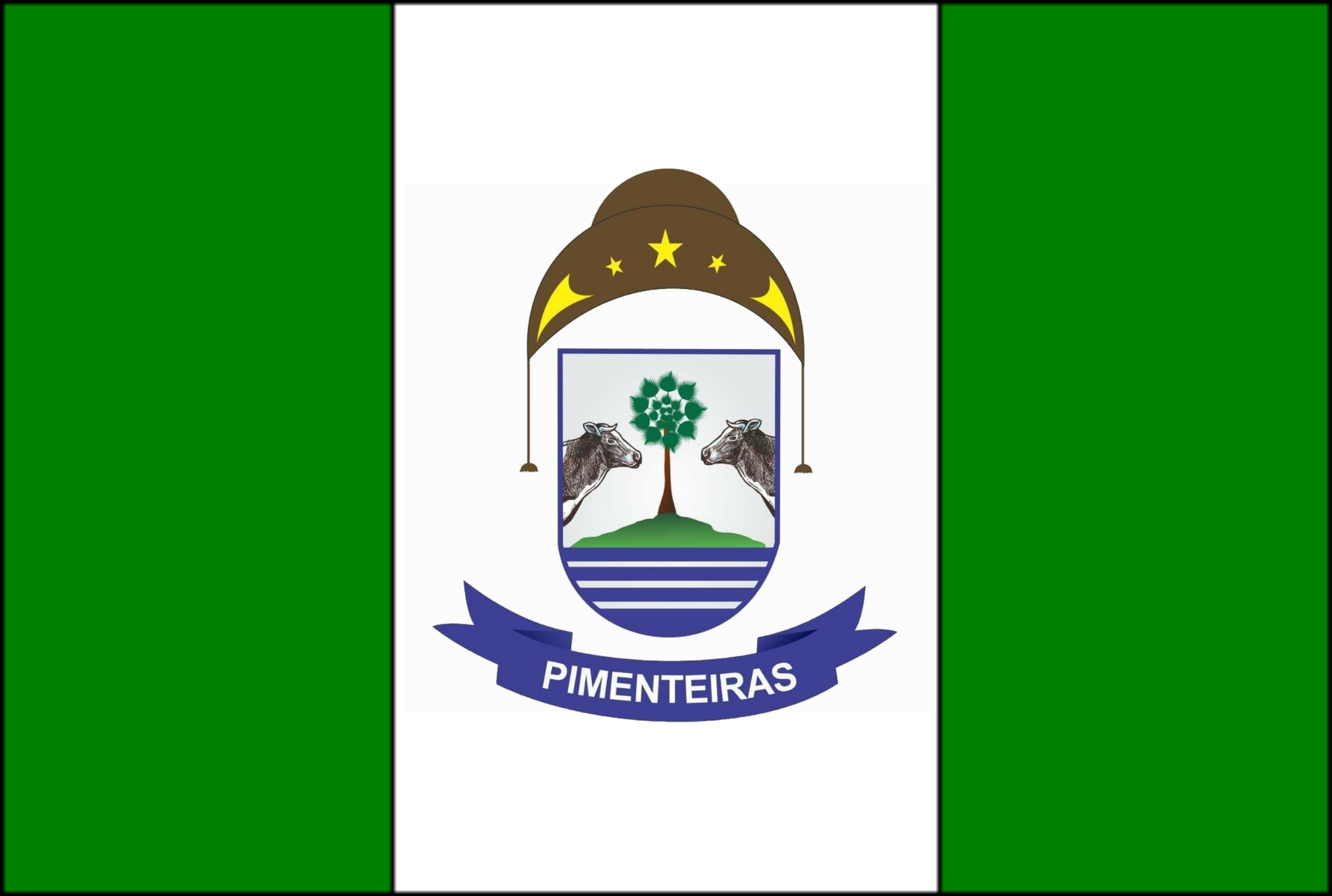
- Flag

- Country: Brazil
- Region: Nordeste
- State: Piauí
- Mesoregion: Centro-Norte Piauiense

Population (2020)
  - Total: 12,139
- Time zone: UTC−3 (BRT)

Pimenteiras is a municipality in the state of Piauí in the Northeast region of Brazil.

== See also ==
- List of municipalities in Piauí
- Pimenteira language
