= Cyrtonellida =

Cyrtonellida Temporal range: Cambrian–Devonian

Scientific classification
- Domain: Eukaryota
- Kingdom: Animalia
- Phylum: Mollusca
- Class: Monoplacophora
- Subclass: Tergomya
- Order: †Cyrtonellida; Horny, 1963

Extinct order of molluscs

Cyrtonellida is a group of "monoplacophora", representing either a sister taxon to, or a polyphyletic assemblage including, the Trybliida.

== Subtaxa ==
- Carcassonnellidae
- Cyrtolitidae
- Cyrtonelloidea
- Pollicinidae

Genera

- Aremellia
- Hamusella
- Tetamocornu
- Yangtzeconus
- Yochelsonia
