= Spongiophyton =

Spongiophyton Temporal range: Early Devonian – Middle Devonian

Scientific classification
- Domain: Eukaryota
- Clade: Archaeplastida
- Clade: Viridiplantae
- Family: †Spongiophytaceae
- Genus: †Spongiophyton; Kräusel (1954)

Type species
- †Spongiophyton lenticulare (Barbosa) Kräusel (1954)

Species
- †S. articulatum Kräusel (1954); †S. hirsutum Kräusel (1954); †S. lenticulare (Barbosa) Kräusel (1954); †S. minutissimum Kräusel (1954); †S. nanum Kräusel (1954)

Devonian fossil of a plant-like thallose organism

Spongiophyton was a thallose fossil of the early to mid-Devonian, which is notoriously difficult to classify.

Spongiophyton displayed dichotomous branching, and a flattened/elliptical cross section with a thick (20–80 μm) upper cuticular surface. It is also perforated with pores resembling those of some liverworts. It probably grew on the banks of rivers. Spongiophyton has been mistakenly interpreted as tree resin and lycopod cuticle, and was later identified as the cuticle of a thalloid plant. It has most recently been interpreted on morphological and isotopic grounds as a lichen—which would place it with Winfrenatia among the earliest known representatives of this group.

The significance of the isotopic data has, however, been called into question. Jahren et al. argued that mosses and liverworts had a δ^{13}C signature of under −26‰, and lichens were exclusively > −26‰. But in deducing this they relied solely on their own data, neglecting to include published datasets or bryophytes from a wide range of habitats. They also failed to take into account any adjustment necessary to overcome post-burial alteration of the δ^{13}C, or to compensate for the different isotopic composition of the early Devonian atmosphere. Repeating Jahren's experiments with these factors taken into account shows that most major groups' δ^{13}C values overlap significantly, and do not provide a statistically significant case for the inclusion of Spongiophyton in any group.

== Palaeobiology ==
=== Life history ===
Spongiophyton exhibited a pattern of growth and development more similar to the pseudoparenchymatous alga Cutleria than to Pellia or Protosalvinia.
