= Sinuitidae =

Scientific classification
- Kingdom: Animalia
- Phylum: Mollusca
- Class: Gastropoda (?)
- Order: †Bellerophontida
- Superfamily: †Bellerophontoidea
- Family: †Sinuitidae; Dall, 1913

Genera
- See text

Extinct family of gastropods

Sinuitidae is an extinct family of Paleozoic molluscs of uncertain position (they were either Gastropoda or Monoplacophora). They had isostrophically coiled shells.

== Taxonomy ==
The taxonomy of the Gastropoda by Bouchet & Rocroi, 2005 categorizes Sinuitidae in the superfamilia Bellerophontoidea within the Paleozoic molluscs of uncertain systematic position with isostrophically coiled shells (Gastropoda or Monoplacophora).

This family consists of the following subfamilies (according to the taxonomy of the Gastropoda by Bouchet & Rocroi, 2005):

- Sinuitinae Dall, 1913 - synonym: Protowarthiidae Ulrich & Scofield, 1897 (inv.)
- Aiptospirinae Wang, 1980
- Hispanosinuitinae Frýda & Gutierrez-Marco, 1996

== Genera ==
Genera in the family Sinuitidae include:

- Sinuites Koken, 1896 - type genus of the family Sinuitidae. Genus Sinuites has large aperture, its outer lip is bilobate. The dorsal side is convex. The umbilicus is closed.
