= Cyrtolitidae =

Cyrtolitidae Temporal range: 488.3–383.7 Ma

Scientific classification
- Domain: Eukaryota
- Kingdom: Animalia
- Phylum: Mollusca
- Class: Monoplacophora
- Order: †Cyrtonellida
- Family: †Cyrtolitidae; Miller, 1889

Extinct family of molluscs

Cyrtolitidae is an extinct family of monoplacophorans in the order Cyrtonellida.

== Genera ==
- Cloudia
- Cyclocyrtonella
- Cyrtolites
- Cyrtonellopsis
- Kolihadiscus
- Neocyrtolites
- Paracyrtolites
- Quasisinuites
- Sinuella
- Sinuitopsina
- Sinuitopsis
- Telamocornu
- Yochelsonellis
