= Edward Oscar Ulrich =

American paleontologist (1857–1944)

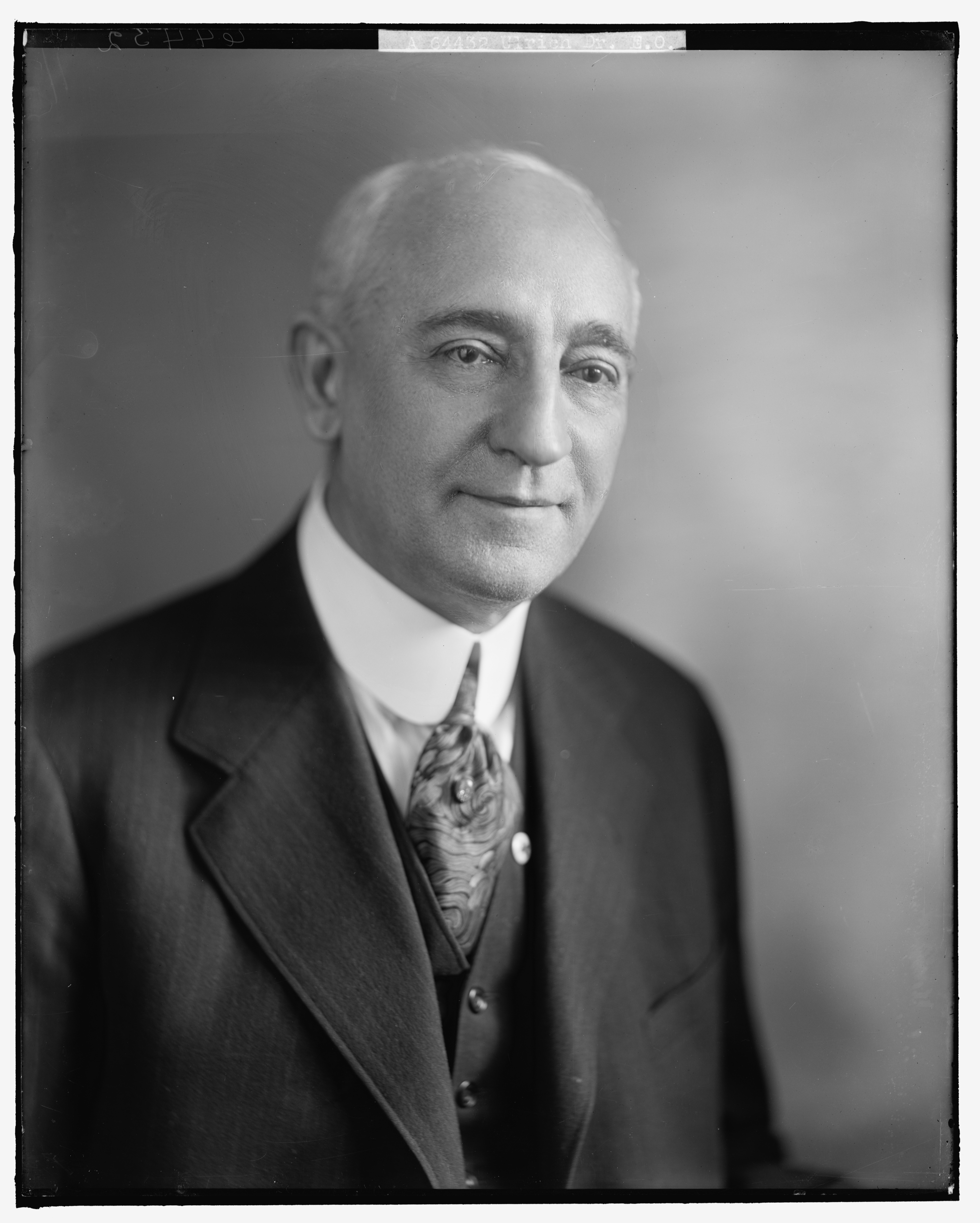
Edward Oscar Ulrich in 1905

Edward Oscar Ulrich (1 February 1857, in Covington, Kentucky – 22 February 1944, in Washington, D.C.) was an invertebrate paleontologist specializing in the study of Paleozoic fossils.

== Biography ==
Ulrich was educated at Wallace College and the Ohio Medical College. Abandoning the practice of medicine, he became curator of the Cincinnati Society of Natural History in 1877, and later was paleontologist to geological surveys of Illinois, Minnesota, and Ohio, also associate editor for ten years of the American Geologist.

Ulrich was a prolific writer, publishing numerous pamphlets on the subject of American paleontology, treating particularly the fossil Bryozoa, Gastropoda, Ostracoda, and Pelecypoda. In 1930, he was awarded the Mary Clark Thompson Medal from the National Academy of Sciences, and he was awarded the Penrose Medal in 1932.

In 1926, with Ray S. Bassler, he described the conodont genus Ancyrodella,

== Legacy ==
An extinct species of graptolite, Climacograptus ulrichi, was named for him in 1908.

Bactritimimus ulrichi, an extinct Carboniferous belemnite, was named in honor of Ulrich in 1959.

In 2002, an extinct genus of monoplacophorans, Ulrichoconus, was named in his honor for his geological studies of the Ozark Plateaus.
