= Bellerophontida =

Bellerophontida Temporal range: Early Cambrian–Olenekian (Possible Anisian records)

Scientific classification
- Domain: Eukaryota
- Kingdom: Animalia
- Phylum: Mollusca
- Class: Gastropoda (?)
- Order: †Bellerophontida; Ulrich & Scofield, 1897

Extinct order of gastropods

The Bellerophontida is a taxonomic order of extinct marine mollusks that are found in the fossil record from the Lower Cambrian to the Lower Triassic. They are considered by some experts to be primitive sea snails with primarily symmetrically coiled shells, marine gastropod mollusks.

R.C Moore and J. Brooks Knight et al 1960 recognized bellerophonts as true gastropods, placing them as the suborder Bellerophontina in the subclass Prosobranchia, order Archaeogastropoda. Some more recent workers in the field have expressed uncertainty as to the taxonomic placement of this group.

== Shell morphology ==
Shells of bellerophontids are most commonly isotrophic (coiled symmetrically), rarely slightly asymmetric. Most are closely coiled with some general more openly coiled, cyrtiform; predominantly with a median slit in the upper lip of the aperture, or with a series of openings known as tremata, usually generating a selenizone which was probably exhalant in function. The shell wall is of variable thickness and no evidence of nacre or of an operculum has been found. Nothing is known of soft part anatomy of the group, although a simple pair of retractor muscles is inferred from muscle scars. Isotrophic symmetry also suggests paired and equal nephridia and ctenidia (kidneys and gills).

== Taxonomy ==
According to Knight, et al, the Bellerophontina, as then regarded, includes two superfamilies, the Helcionellacea, and the Bellerphonitacea. The Helcionellacea are the more primitive, with more cap-like shells, that are limited to the Cambrian Period. Two small families, the Helcionellidae and Coreospiridae are included. The Bellerophontacea, which range from the Upper Cambrian to the Lower Triassic, are more developed and more diverse; that taxon contains three families, the Cyrtolitidae, Sinuitidae, and Bellerophontidae, along with subfamilies and tribes.

Ponder & Lindberg (1997) included the Bellerophontida, as the Bellerophontinaka, in with the Mimophserina, in the Class Gastropoda, incertæ sedis, excluding them from the Eogastropoda, or Prosobranchia. Bouchet & Rocroi (2005) expressed greater uncertainty, placing the bellerophonts, as Bellerophontoidea in Paleozoic molluscs with isostrophically coiled shells of uncertain position (Gastropoda or Monoplacophora).

More recently, J.P. Wager, 2011 included the Bellerophontida as an order in the Gastropoda.
