= List of abalone synonyms =

Carl Linnaeus described the type species Haliotis asinina in 1758, and over the centuries a large number of additional species of abalone were named using the proper scientific process for naming a species. In addition, some subspecies, forms, and varieties were also named. However, many of these names subsequently proved to be synonyms of species that had already been named. The following is a list of what are, in 2014, considered to be valid species and subspecies, with the synonyms listed beside them.

== Synonyms of species ==
The following species have been brought into synonymy:

(Sub)Species	Synonyms
Haliotis asinina	Haliotis asinum Donovan, 1808
Haliotis australis	Haliotis aleata Röding, 1798; Haliotis costata Swainson, 1822; Haliotis rugosoplicata Schumacher, 1817
Haliotis brazieri	Haliotis hargravesi Cox, 1869; Haliotis brazieri f. hargravesi (Cox, 1869); Marinauris hargravesi (Cox, 1869)
Haliotis clathrata	Haliotis clathrata f. tomricei Patamakanthin, 2002; Haliotis tomricei Patamakanthin, 2002; Haliotis tuvuthaensis Ladd in Ladd & Hofmeister, 1945; Haliotis venusta A. Adams & Reeve, 1848
Haliotis corrugata corrugata	Haliotis diegoensis Orcutt, 1900; Haliotis nodosa Philippi, 1845
Haliotis corrugata oweni	Haliotis oweni Talmadge, 1966
Haliotis cracherodii californiensis	Haliotis bonita Orcutt, 1900; Haliotis californiensis Swainson, 1822
Haliotis cracherodii cracherodii	Haliotis cracerodii var. holzneri Hemphill, 1907; Haliotis expansa Talmadge, 1957; Haliotis imperforata Dall, 1919; Haliotis Iusus Finlay, 1927; Haliotis rosea Orcutt, 1900; Haliotis splendidula Williamson, 1893
Haliotis cyclobates	Haliotis excavata Lamarck, 1822
Haliotis dalli roberti	Haliotis roberti McLean, 1970
Haliotis dissona	Sanhaliotis dissona Iredale, 1929; Haliotis crebrisculpta Sowerby, 1914
Haliotis diversicolor	Sulculus diversicolor
Haliotis diversicolor diversicolor	Sulculus diversicolor diversicolor; Haliotis gruneri Reeve, 1846; Haliotis tayloriana Reeve, 1846
Haliotis diversicolor squamata	Haliotis squamata Reeve, 1846; Haliotis elevata G. B. Sowerby II, 1882; Haliotis funebris Reeve, 1846
Haliotis elegans	Haliotis clathrata Lichtenstein, 1794
Haliotis fulgens fulgens	Haliotis planilirata Reeve, 1846; Haliotis splendens Reeve, 1846
Haliotis fulgens guadalupensis	Haliotis guadalupensis Talmadge, 1964
Haliotis fulgens turveri	Haliotis turveri Bartsch, 1942
Haliotis gigantea	Haliotis gigas Röding, 1798; Haliotis sieboldii Reeve, 1846; Haliotis tubifera Lamarck, 1822
Haliotis glabra	Haliotis picta Röding, 1798; Haliotis ziczac Reeve, 1846
Haliotis imperforata Gmelin, 1791	Stomatia phymotis Helbling, 1779
Haliotis jacnensis jacnensis	Haliotis echinata G. B. Sowerby II, 1882; Haliotis hanleyi Ancey, 1881
Haliotis kamtschatkana assimilis	Haliotis assimilis Dall, 1878; Haliotis aulaea Bartsch, 1940; Haliotis smithsoni Bartsch, 1940
Haliotis laevigata	Haliotis glabra Swainson, 1822; Haliotis albicans Quoy & Gaimard, 1834; Schismotis excisa Gray, 1856
Haliotis madaka	Nordotis madaka Habe, 1977
Haliotis mariae	Haliotis dentata Jonas, 1844; Haliotis mariae dentata Jonas, 1846; Haliotis mariae mariae Wood, 1828
Haliotis marmorata	Haliotis desussata Philippi, 1850; Haliotis guineensis Gmelin, 1791; Haliotis rosacea Reeve, 1846; Haliotis strigata Weinkauff, 1883; Haliotis virginea Reeve, 1846
Haliotis melculus	Haliotis ethologus (Iredale, 1927); Marinauris ethologus Iredale, 1927; Marinauris melculus Iredale, 1927
Haliotis midae	Haliotis capensis Dunker, R.W., 1844; Haliotis elatior Pilsbry, 1890; Haliotis midae elitior Pilsbry, 1890
Haliotis ovina ovina	Haliotis caelata Röding, 1798; Haliotis latilabris Philippi, 1848; Haliotis ovina ovina f. patamakanthin Dekker, Regter & Gras, 2001; Haliotis patamakanthin Dekker, Regter & Gras, 2001
Haliotis ovina volcanius	Haliotis volcanius Patamakanthin & Eng, 2002
Haliotis papulata	Haliotis thailandis Dekker & Patamakanthin, 2001
Haliotis parva	Haliotis canaliculata Lamarck, 1822; Haliotis canaliculata Fischer von Waldheim, 1807; Haliotis carinata Swainson, 1822; Haliotis cingulata Röding, 1798; Haliotis kraussi Turton, 1932; Haliotis rubicunda Röding, 1798; Padollus rubicundus Montfort, 1810
Haliotis planata	Haliotis grayana G. B. Sowerby II, 1882
Haliotis pourtalesii aurantium	Haliotis aurantium Simone, 1998
Haliotis roei	Haliotis scabricostata Menke, 1843; Haliotis sulcosa Philippi, 1845
Haliotis rubiginosa	Haliotis howensis (Iredale, 1929); Sanhaliotis howensis Iredale, 1929
Haliotis rubra conicopora	Haliotis conicopora Péron, 1816; Haliotis cunninghami Gray, 1826; Haliotis granti Pritchard & Gatliff, 1902; Haliotis vixlirata Cotton, 1943
Haliotis rubra rubra	Haliotis ancile Reeve, 1846; Haliotis improbula Iredale, 1924; Haliotis naevosa Philippi, 1844; Haliotis ruber Leach, 1814; Haliotis whitehousei (Colman, 1959); Sanhaliotis whitehousei Colman, 1959
Haliotis rufescens	Haliotis californiana Valenciennes, 1832; Haliotis hattorii Bartsch, 1940; Haliotis ponderosa C. B. Adams, 1848
Haliotis rugosa pustulata	Haliotis (Sulculus) pustulata Reeve, 1846; Haliotis cruenta Reeve, 1846; Haliotis jousseaumi Mabille, 1888; Haliotis multiperforata Reeve, 1846; Haliotis pustulata Reeve, 1846; Haliotis scutulum Reeve, 1846
Haliotis rugosa rugosa	Haliotis nebulata Reeve, 1846; Haliotis alternata G. B. Sowerby II, 1882; Haliotis revelata Deshayes, 1863; Haliotis pertusa Reeve, 1846
Haliotis scalaris	Padollus scalaris Leach, 1814
Haliotis scalaris scalaris	Haliotis crenata Swainson, 1822; Haliotis tricostalis Lamarck, 1822; Haliotis tricostata W. Wood, 1828
Haliotis semiplicata	Haliotis lauta Reeve, 1846
Haliotis spadicea	Haliotis ficiformis Menke, 1844; Haliotis sanguinea Hanley, 1840; Haliotis sinuata Perry, 1811
Haliotis squamosa	Haliotis crebrisculpta G. B. Sowerby III, 1914; Haliotis roedingi Menke, 1844
Haliotis stomatiaeformis	Haliotis neglecta Philippi, 1848
Haliotis supertexta	Haliotis diversicolor supertexta Lischke, 1870
Haliotis tuberculata coccinea	Haliotis canariensis F. Nordsieck, 1975; Haliotis coccinea Reeve, 1846; Haliotis tuberculata canariensis F. Nordsieck, 1975; Haliotis zealandica Reeve, 1846
Haliotis tuberculata lamellosa	Haliotis lamellosa Lamarck, 1822; Haliotis adriatica Nardo, 1847; Haliotis lamellosa var. auriculata Monterosato, 1888; Haliotis lamellosa var. marmorata Pallary, 1900; Haliotis lamellosa var. planata Monterosato, 1888; Haliotis lamellosa var. producta Monterosato, 1888; Haliotis lamellosa var. rubra Pallary, 1900; Haliotis lamellosa var. viridis Pallary, 1900; Haliotis marmorata O. G. Costa, 1829; Haliotis reticulata var. bisundata Monterosato, 1884
Haliotis tuberculata tuberculata	Haliotis aquatilis Reeve, 1846; Haliotis incisa Reeve, 1846; Haliotis janus Reeve, 1846; Haliotis japonica Reeve, 1846; Haliotis lamellosa var. secernenda Monterosato, 1877; Haliotis lucida Requien, 1848; Haliotis ormier Dautzenberg, 1891; Haliotis pellucida von Salis, 1793; Haliotis reticulata Reeve, 1846; Haliotis rugosa Reeve, 1846; Haliotis striata Linnaeus, 1758; Haliotis tuberculata var. bisundata Monterosato, 1884; Haliotis vulgaris da Costa, 1778
Haliotis unilateralis	Haliotis barbouri Foster, 1946
Haliotis varia	Haliotis astricta Reeve, 1846; Haliotis concinna Reeve, 1846; Haliotis dohrniana Dunker, R.W., 1863; Haliotis dringii Reeve, 1846; Haliotis gemma Reeve, 1846; Haliotis granulata Röding, 1798; 1846; Haliotis pustulifera Pilsbry, 1890; Haliotis semistriata Reeve, 1846; Haliotis viridis Reeve, 1846; Sanhaliotis aliena Iredale, 1929
Haliotis virginea	Haliotis gibba Philippi, 1846; Haliotis marmorata Reeve, 1846; Haliotis subvirginea Weinkauff, 1883; Haliotis virginea virginea Gmelin, 1791
Haliotis virginea virginea	Haliotis gibba Philippi, 1846; Haliotis marmorata Reeve, 1846; Haliotis subvirginea Weinkauff, 1883
Haliotis walallensis	Haliotis fulgens var. walallensis Stearns, 1899
