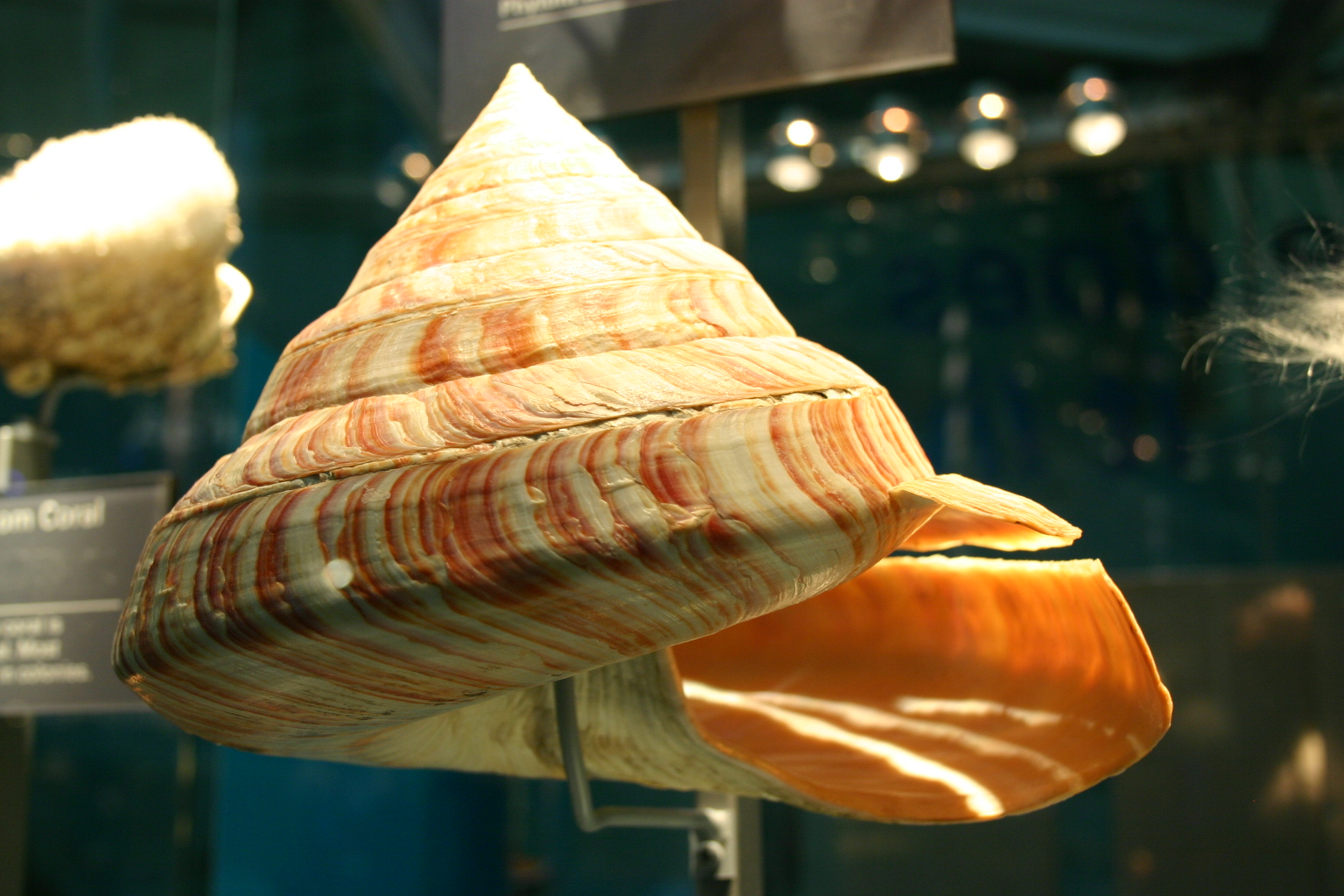
- Apertural view of a shell of Entemnotrochus rumphii

Scientific classification
- Kingdom: Animalia
- Phylum: Mollusca
- Class: Gastropoda
- Order: Archaeogastropoda
- Superfamily: Pleurotomariacea

Families
- See text

= Pleurotomariacea =

Pleurotomariacea Temporal range: U Cam - Rec

Superfamily of molluscs

Pleurotomariacea is one of two names that are used for a taxonomic superfamily of sea snails that are an ancient lineage and are well represented in the fossil record. The name Pleurotomariacea is used by paleontologists, who, because they usually have only the hard parts of mollusks to study, often use a slightly different scheme of classification from that used by scientists who study living mollusks.

The name Pleurotomariacea is based on Swainson, 1840 (Pleurotomariae) and was described in 1960 in the Treatise on Invertebrate Paleontology, (I197) The taxon was established for mostly conispiral, but also discoidal and auriform (ear-like) shells which have a nacreous, aragonite, inner layer.

The Pleurotomariacea, now often seen as Pleurotomarioidea, has been included in the Archaegastropoda. although more recent classifications put it in a more restricted sense in the Vetigastropoda

The evolutionary derivation of the group is thought to be from the Bellerophontacea and to have happened late in the Cambrian. Earlier gastropods belonged to the Helcionellacea, Bellerophontacea, and questionably to the Palegiellacea.

The Treatise lists the following families, here in alphabetical order. Catantostomatidae, Eotomariidae, Euomphalopteridae, Gosselitinidae, Haliotidae, Kittlidiscidae, Laubellidae, Lophospiridae, Luciellidae, Phanerotrematidae, Phymatopleuridae, Pleurotromariidae, Polytremerida, Portlockiellidae, Rhaphischismatidae, Raphystomatidae, Scissurellidae, Sinuopeidae, Tremnotropidae, Trochotomidae, Zygitidae.

Bouchet & Rocroi, 2005, with a greater emphasis on molecular characteristics than shell characters, limited the Pleurotomariacea, as Pleurotomarioidea, to the Pleurotomariidae, Catantostomatidae, Kittilidacidae, Phymatopleuridae, Portlockiellidae, Rhaphischismatidae, Trochotomidae, and Zygitidae. The other families that are included in this superfamily in the Treatise have been reassigned by Bouchet & Rocroi to other higher taxa.

== Recent families ==
The following are the Recent families in the superfamily, along with their respective living species:

- Pleurotomariidae
  - Pleurotomaria (Entemnotrochus) adansonianus (Adanson's Slit Shell; found in West Indies and the Caribbean)
  - Pleurotomaria (Entemnotrochus) rumphii (Rumphius' Slit Shell; found in Japan and Taiwan)
  - Pleurotomaria (Mikadotrochus) beyrichii (Beyrich's Slit Shell; found in the deep water of China and Japan)
  - Pleurotomaria (Mikadotrochus) mikadotrochus (Emperor's Slitshell; found in Japan)
  - Pleurotomaria (Mikadotrochus) notialis (found in southern Brazil)
  - Pleurotomaria (Mikadotrochus) salmianus (Salmiana Slit Shell; found in Japan)
  - Pleurotomaria (Mikadotrochus) schmalzi (found in Japan)
  - Pleurotomaria (Perotrochus) africana (South African Slit Shell; found in South Africa): synonym of Bayerotrochus africanus (Tomlin, 1948)
  - Pleurotomaria (Perotrochus) amabilis (Lovely Slit Shell; found in west Florida in the Lower Florida Keys)
  - Pleurotomaria (Perotrochus) anseeuwi
  - Pleurotomaria (Perotrochus) atlantica (Atlantic Slit Shell; found in Brazil)
  - Pleurotomaria (Perotrochus) caledonicus
  - Pleurotomaria (Perotrochus) diluculum (Dawn Slit Shell; found in central Japan)
  - Pleurotomaria (Perotrochus) gemma (Jewel Slit Shell; found in Barbados, Lesser Antilles)
  - Pleurotomaria (Perotrochus) gotoi
  - Pleurotomaria (Perotrochus) hirasei (The Emperor's/Hirasei's Slit Shell; found in the deep water of Japan)
  - Pleurotomaria (Perotrochus) lucaya (Lucayan Slit Shell; found in Grand Bahama Island)
  - Pleurotomaria (Perotrochus) midas (King Midas's Slit Shell; found in the central Bahama Islands)
  - Pleurotomaria (Perotrochus) pyramus (Pyramus Slit Shell; found in Guadeloupe, Lesser Antilles)
  - Pleurotomaria (Perotrochus) quoyana (Quoy's Slit Shell; found in the Gulf of Mexico)
  - Pleurotomaria (Perotrochus) teramachii (found in Japan and Taiwan)
  - Pleurotomaria (Perotrochus) vicdani
  - Pleurotomaria (Perotrochus) westralis
- Scissurellidae
  - Schismope cingulata (found in the West Indies)
- Haliotidae
  - Cellana radiata (Rayed Limpet; found in the southwest Pacific)
  - Cellana solida
  - Cellana testudinaria (Turtle Limpet; found in the Indo-Pacific)
  - Haliotis ancile (Shield Abalone; found in the Gulf of Suez and the northwest Indian Ocean)
  - Haliotis aquatilis (Japanese Abalone; found between Japan and Korea)
  - Haliotis aquatilis
  - Haliotis asinina (Ass's Ear Abalone; found in the southwest Pacific)
  - Haliotis assimilis (Threaded Abalone; found between Southern California and Baja California)
  - Haliotis australis (Austral Abalone; found in New Zealand)
  - Haliotis brazieri (Brazier's Abalone; found in southeast Australia)
  - Haliotis coccinea (found in Cape Verde and the Canaries)
  - Haliotis coccoradiata (Reddish rayed Abalone; found in southeast Australia)
  - Haliotis conicopora (Conical Pore Abalone; found in southern Australia)
  - Haliotis conicopora vixlirata (found in southwest Australia)
  - Haliotis corrugata (Pink Abalone; found between Southern California and Baja California)
  - Haliotis cracherodii (Black Abalone; found between Oregon and Baja California)
  - Haliotis crebrisculpta (Close sculptures Abalone; found between Japan and northern Australia)
  - Haliotis cyclobates (Whirling Abalone; found in southern Australia and Victoria)
  - Haliotis dalli (Dall's Abalone; found in the Galapagos and west Colombia)
  - Haliotis discus (Disk Abalone; found in Japan and between Korea and northern China)
  - Haliotis diversicolor (Variously colored Abalone; found in the southwest Pacific)
  - Haliotis dohrniana (Dohrn's Abalone; found between New Hebrides (Vanuatu) and Indonesia)
  - Haliotis elegans (Elegant Abalone; found in western Australia)
  - Haliotis emmae (Emma's Abalone; found between southern Australia and Tasmania)
  - Haliotis ethologus (Mimic Abalone; found in northeast Australia)
  - Haliotis fulgens (Green Abalone; found between Southern California and Baja California)
  - Haliotis gigantea (Giant Abalone; found between Japan and Korea)
  - Haliotis glabra (Glistening Abalone; found between the Philippines and northern Australia)
  - Haliotis hargravesi (Hargraves's Abalone; found in eastern Australia)
  - Haliotis howensis (Lord Howe Abalone; found in eastern Australia)
  - Haliotis iris (Rainbow/Paua Abalone; found in New Zealand)
  - Haliotis jacnensis (Jacna Abalone; found in the Philippines)
  - Haliotis kamtschatkana (Japanese Abalone; found between Northern California and Alaska and in Japan)
  - Haliotis laevigata (Smooth Australian Abalone; found in southern Australia)
  - Haliotis lamellosa (found in the Mediterranean and Senegal)
  - Haliotis melculus (Honey Abalone; found in Queensland, Australia)
  - Haliotis midae (Midas Ear Abalone; found between Table Bay and Natal)
  - Haliotis multiperforata (Many-holed Abalone; found in the Indian Ocean)
  - Haliotis ovina (Oval Abalone; found between southern Japan and northern Australia)
  - Haliotis parva (Canaliculate Abalone; found in South Africa)
  - Haliotis planata (Planate Abalone; found in the southwest Pacific)
  - Haliotis pourtalesii (Pourtales's Abalone; found between the southeast United States and Brazil)
  - Haliotis pulcherrima (Most Beautiful Abalone; found in Eastern Polynesia)
  - Haliotis queketti (Quekett's Abalone; found in Natal, South Africa)
  - Haliotis roei (Roe's Abalone; found between western Australia and Victoria)
  - Haliotis rosacea (Rosy Abalone; found in West Africa)
  - Haliotis ruber (Ruber Abalone; found between southern Australia and Tasmania)
  - Haliotis rufescens (Red Abalone; found between Oregon and Baja California)
  - Haliotis scalaris (Staircase/Ridged ear Abalone; found in southern and western Australia)
  - Haliotis semiplicata (Semiplicate Abalone; found in western Australia)
  - Haliotis sieboldi (found in Japan)
  - Haliotis spadicea (Blood-spotted Abalone; found between Table Bay and Natal)
  - Haliotis speciosa (Splendid Abalone; found in South Africa)
  - Haliotis squamata (Scaly Australian Abalone; found in western Australia)
  - Haliotis squamosa (Squamose Abalone; found in western Australia)
  - Haliotis tuberculata (European Edible Abalone/Tuberculate Ormer; found between the Channel Isles and the Canaries and in the Mediterranean)
  - Haliotis tuberculata lamellosa (Lamellose Ormer; found in the Adriatic Sea)
  - Haliotis varia (Variable Abalone; found in the Indo-Pacific)
  - Haliotis venusta (Lovely Abalone; found in the South China Sea)
  - Haliotis virginea (Virgin Abalone; found in New Zealand)
  - Haliotis walallensis (Northern Green Abalone; found between British Columbia and Southern California)
