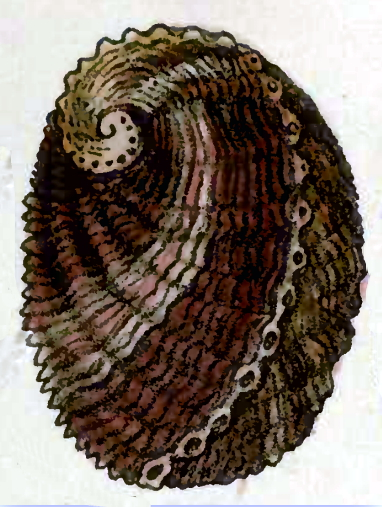
- Drawing of a shell of Haliotis rubiginosa

Conservation status
- Critically Endangered (IUCN 3.1)

Scientific classification
- Kingdom: Animalia
- Phylum: Mollusca
- Class: Gastropoda
- Subclass: Vetigastropoda
- Order: Lepetellida
- Family: Haliotidae
- Genus: Haliotis
- Species: H. rubiginosa

Binomial name
- Haliotis rubiginosa Reeve, 1846

Synonyms
- Haliotis howensis (Iredale, 1929); Sanhaliotis howensis Iredale, 1929

= Haliotis rubiginosa =

Species of gastropod

Haliotis rubiginosa, common name the Lord Howe abalone, is a species of sea snail, a marine gastropod mollusk in the family Haliotidae, the abalone.

This species was previously stated as a synonym, subspecies or form of Haliotis varia Linnaeus, 1758

== Description ==
The size of the shell varies between 30 mm and 50 mm. "The ovate shell is rather convex, radiately plicately wrinkled and spirally ridged. The ridges are obtusely scaled. The six open perforations are rather approximated. The exterior surface is rusty orange, spirally streaked with white. Besides the peculiarity of its sculpture, it is very fairly characterized by its rusty orange painting and silvery interior."

== Distribution and habitat ==
This marine species occurs in the littoral zone of Lord Howe Island, from the intertidal zone down to about 10 meters depth.
