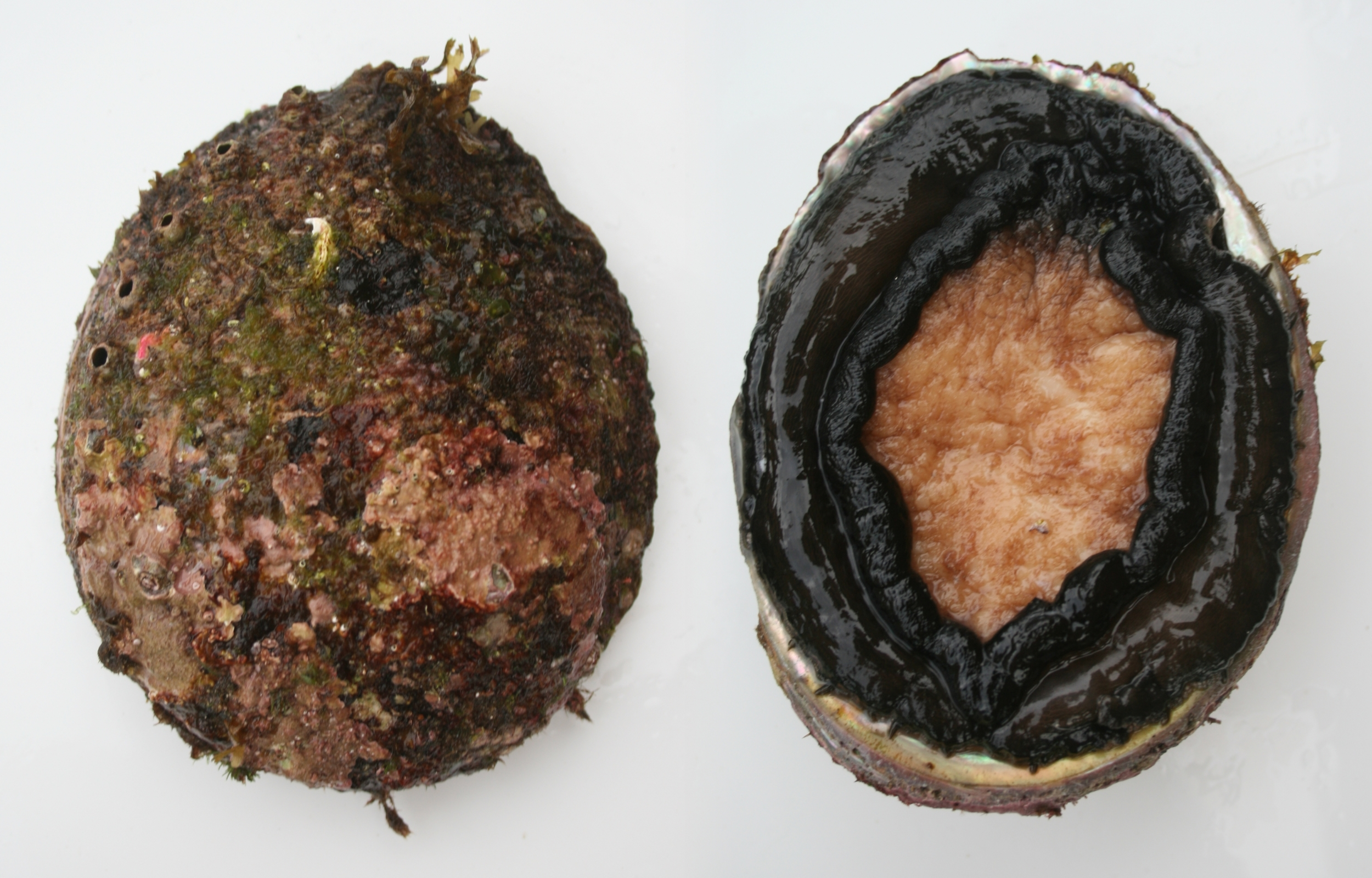

Conservation status
- Vulnerable (IUCN 3.1)

Scientific classification
- Kingdom: Animalia
- Phylum: Mollusca
- Class: Gastropoda
- Subclass: Vetigastropoda
- Order: Lepetellida
- Superfamily: Haliotoidea
- Family: Haliotidae
- Genus: Haliotis
- Species: H. rubra

Binomial name
- Haliotis rubra Leach, 1814

Synonyms
- Haliotis improbula Iredale, T., 1924; Haliotis (Haliotis) ancile Reeve, L.A., 1846; Haliotis (Haliotis) naevosa Philippi, R.A., 1844; Haliotis (Haliotis) tubifera Lamarck, J.B.P.A. de, 1822; Sanhaliotis whitehousei Colman, J.G., 1959

= Haliotis rubra =

Species of gastropod

The blacklip abalone, Haliotis rubra, is an Australian species of large, edible sea snail, a marine gastropod mollusk in the family Haliotidae, the abalone.

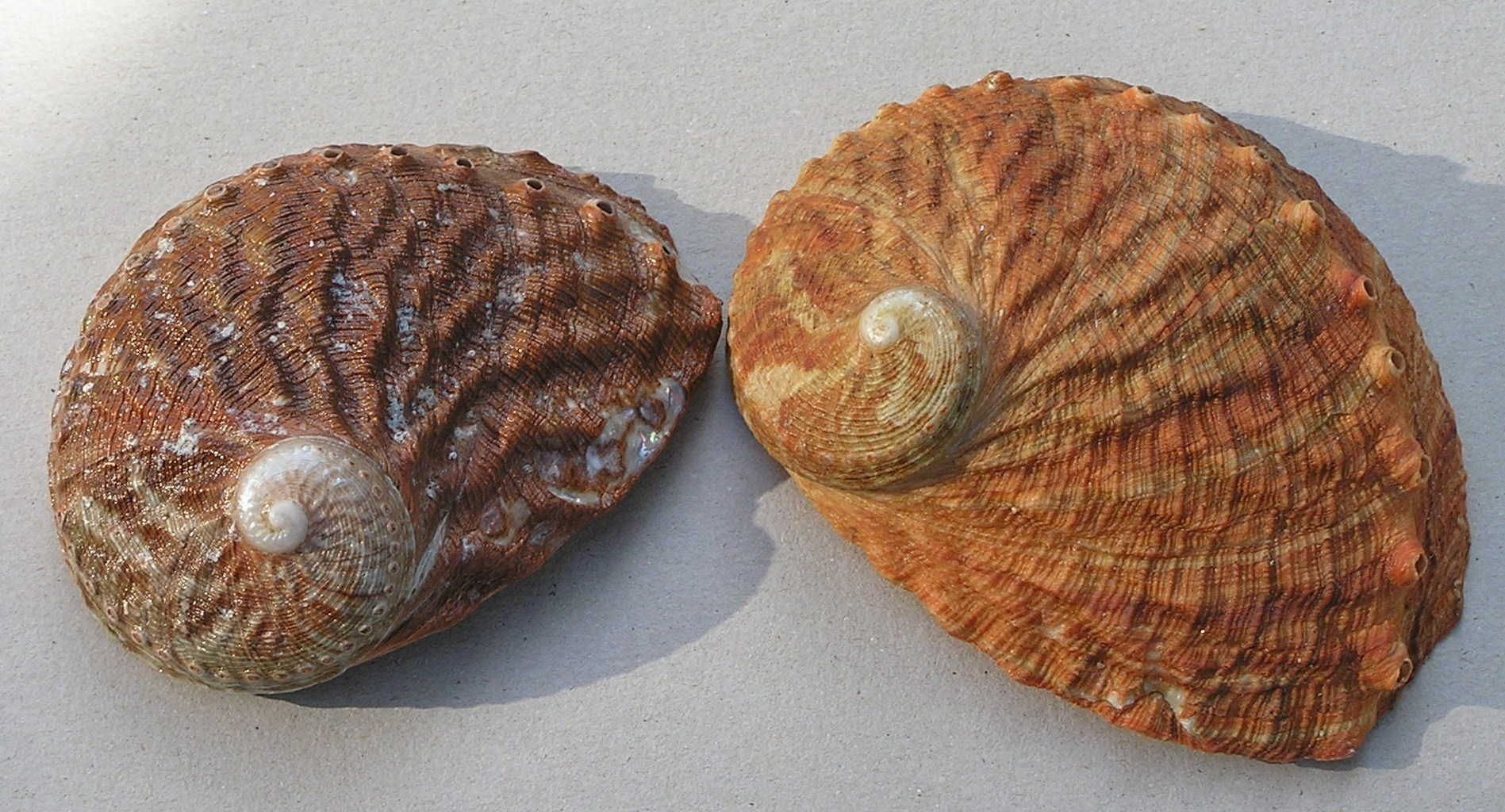
Two shells of Haliotis rubra

== Subspecies ==
- Haliotis rubra conicopora Péron, 1816 – the conical pore abalone; synonyms: Haliotis conicopora Péron, 1816 (original combination), Haliotis cunninghami Gray, 1826; Haliotis granti Pritchard & Gatliff, 1902; Haliotis vixlirata Cotton, 1943
- Haliotis rubra rubra Leach, 1814 the shield abalone; synonyms: Haliotis ancile Reeve, 1846; Haliotis improbula Iredale, 1924; Haliotis naevosa Philippi, 1844; Haliotis ruber Leach, 1814 (original combination); Haliotis whitehousei (Colman, 1959); Sanhaliotis whitehousei Colman, 1959

== Description ==
The size of the shell varies between 3.5 and 20 cm (1.4–7.9 in). "The large, much depressed shell has a rounded-oval shape. The distance of the apex from the margin is one-fifth the length of the shell. It is sculptured with fine spiral cords cut by close minute striae of increment. It shows radiating waves or folds above. A slight angle at the row of perforations, below it is broadly excavated and then carinated. The about six perforations are elevated and circular. The outline is suborbicular, much depressed and solid but not thick. The surface is either dark red with few radiating angular white patches, or dull red and green, streaked and mottled. The spiral cords of the outer surface are either nearly equal, or have slightly larger ones at wide intervals. They are decussated by close growth-striae. The whorls number a trifle over 3. Inside they are corrugated like the outer surface, silvery, and very brilliantly iridescent. The reflections are chiefly sea-green and red. The columellar plate is broad, flat, and obliquely truncated at its base. The cavity of the spire is wide, open, but shallow

This is a variable form, in color varying from dark coral red to dull red streaked with pale green."

== Distribution ==
This species is endemic to Australia, and is one of two species of abalone taken in South Australia and Tasmania (the other is the greenlip abalone). Range is from Fremantle, Western Australia, to Angourie, New South Wales, and around Tasmania.

It is called the blacklip abalone because the edge of the foot is black.

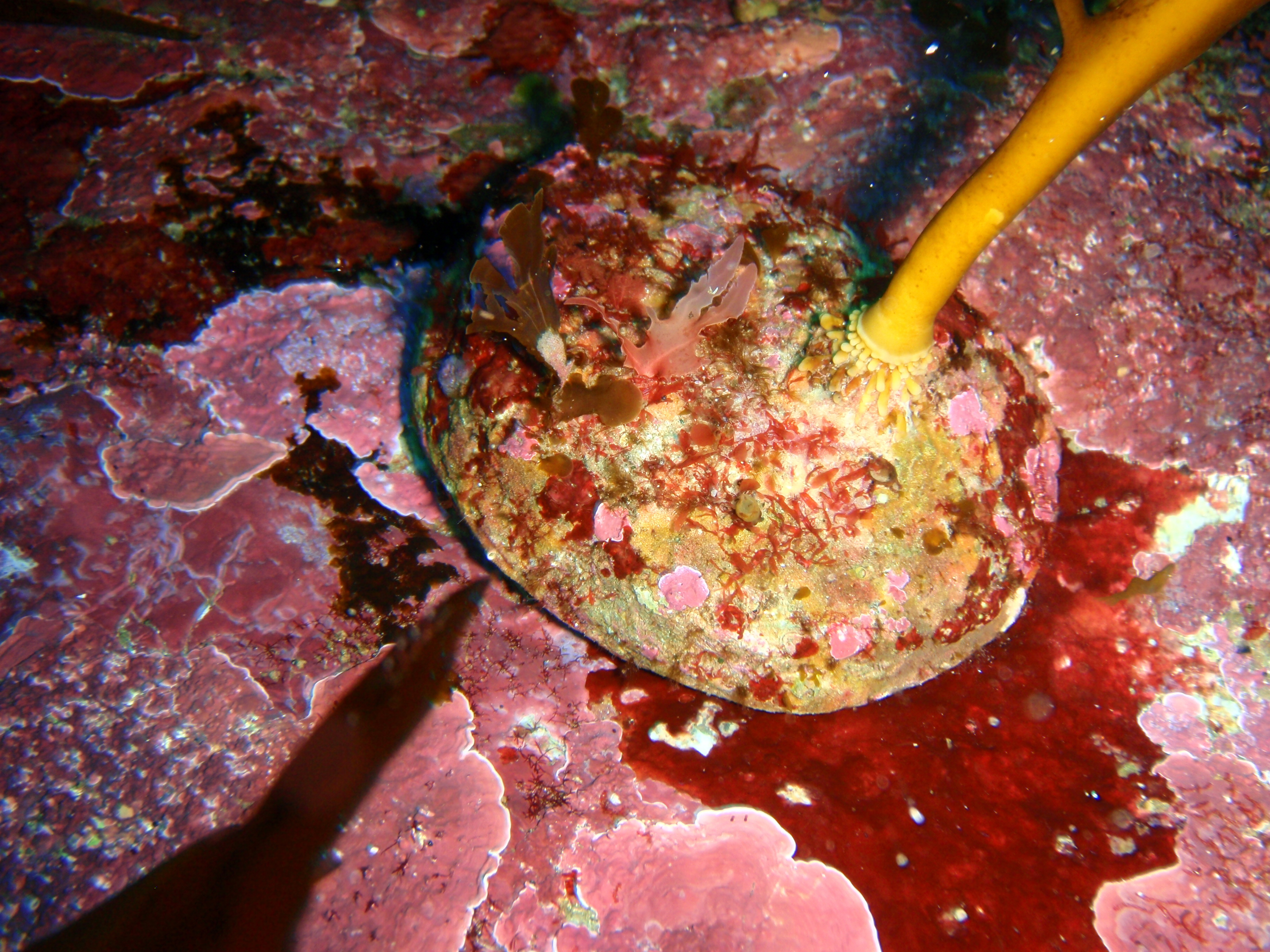
Haliotis rubra with a kelp anchored on the shell

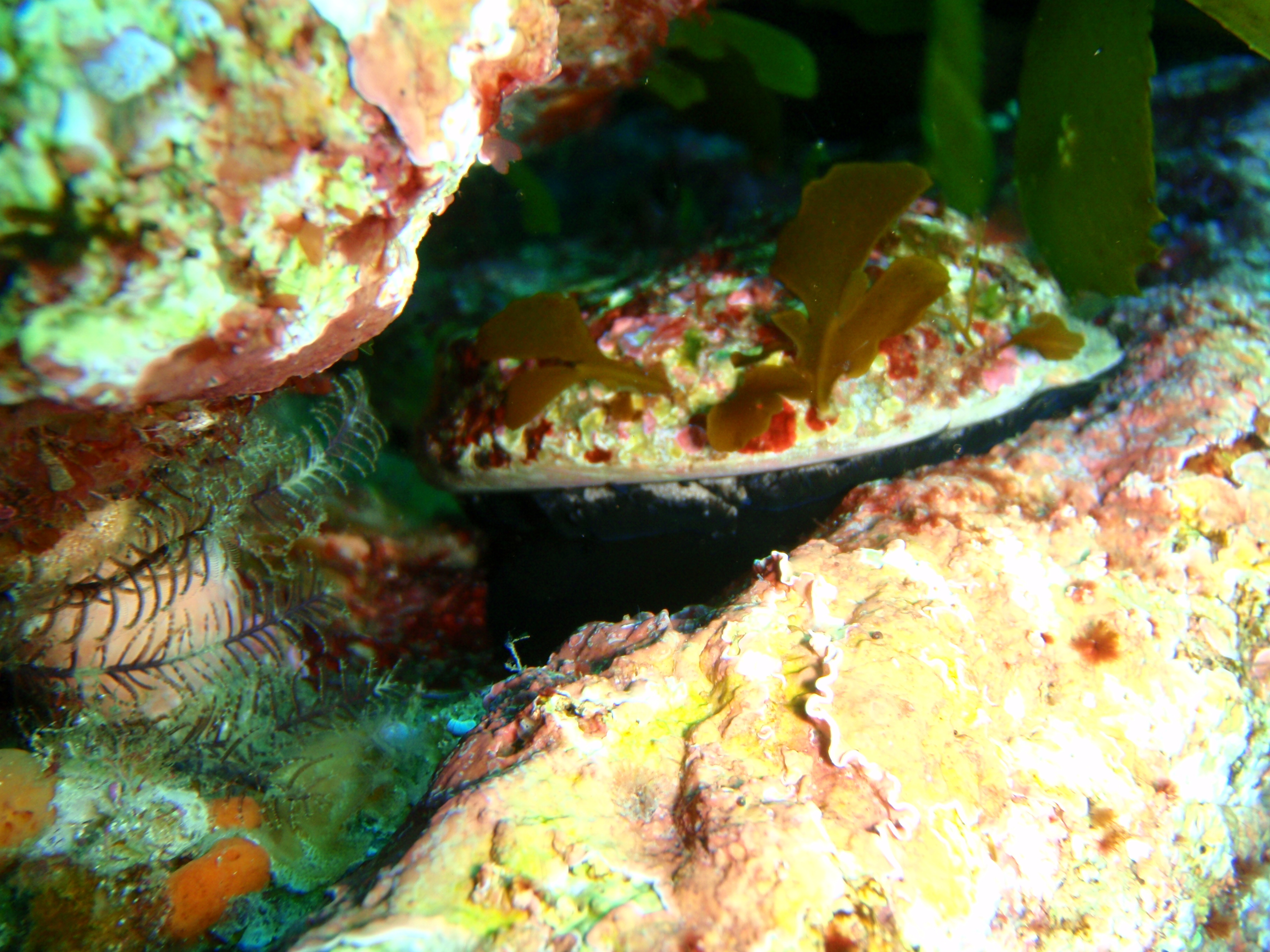
Haliotis rubra showing the characteristic black edge of the foot

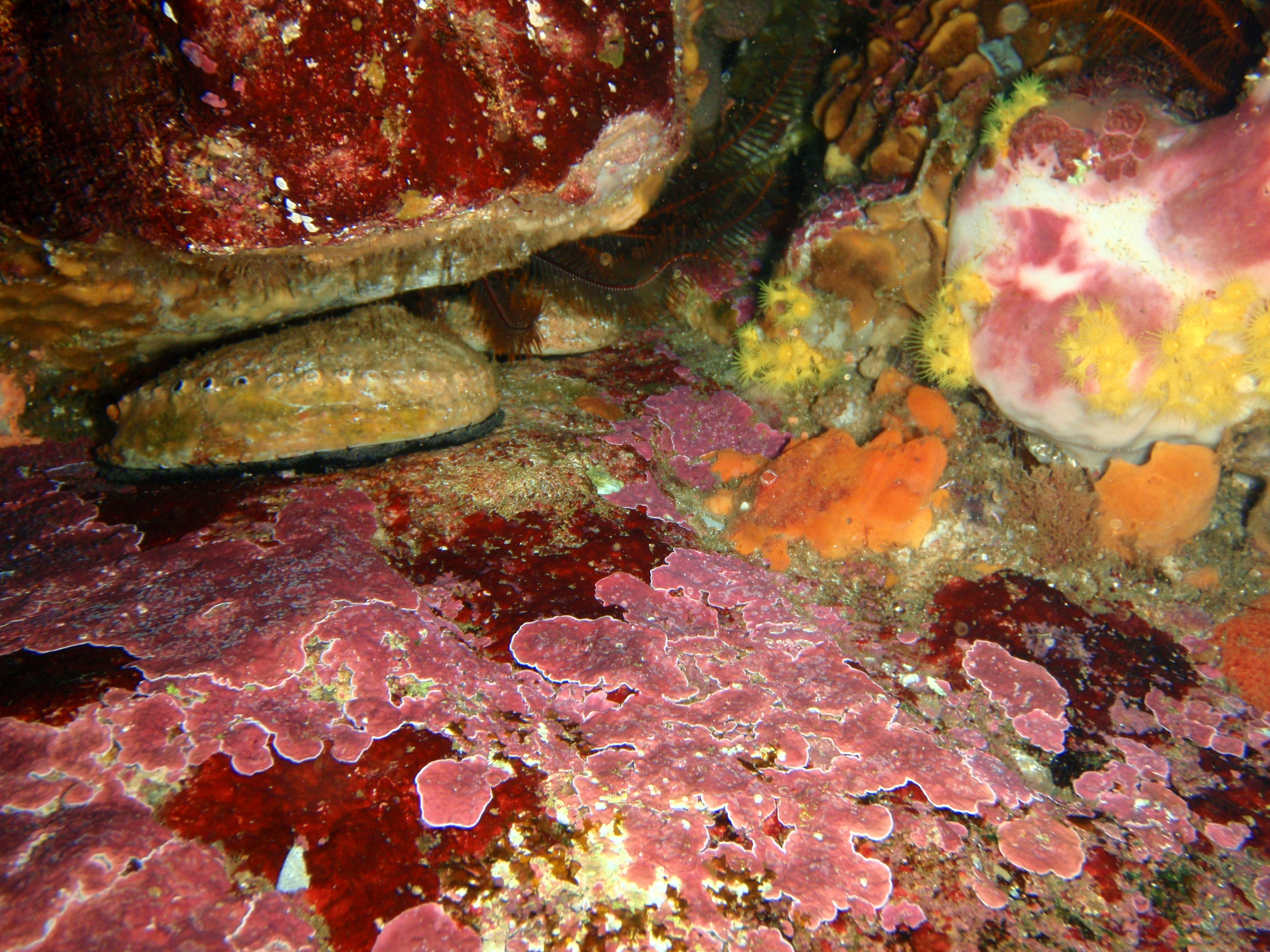
Haliotis rubra frequently choose to shelter in fairly tight crevices

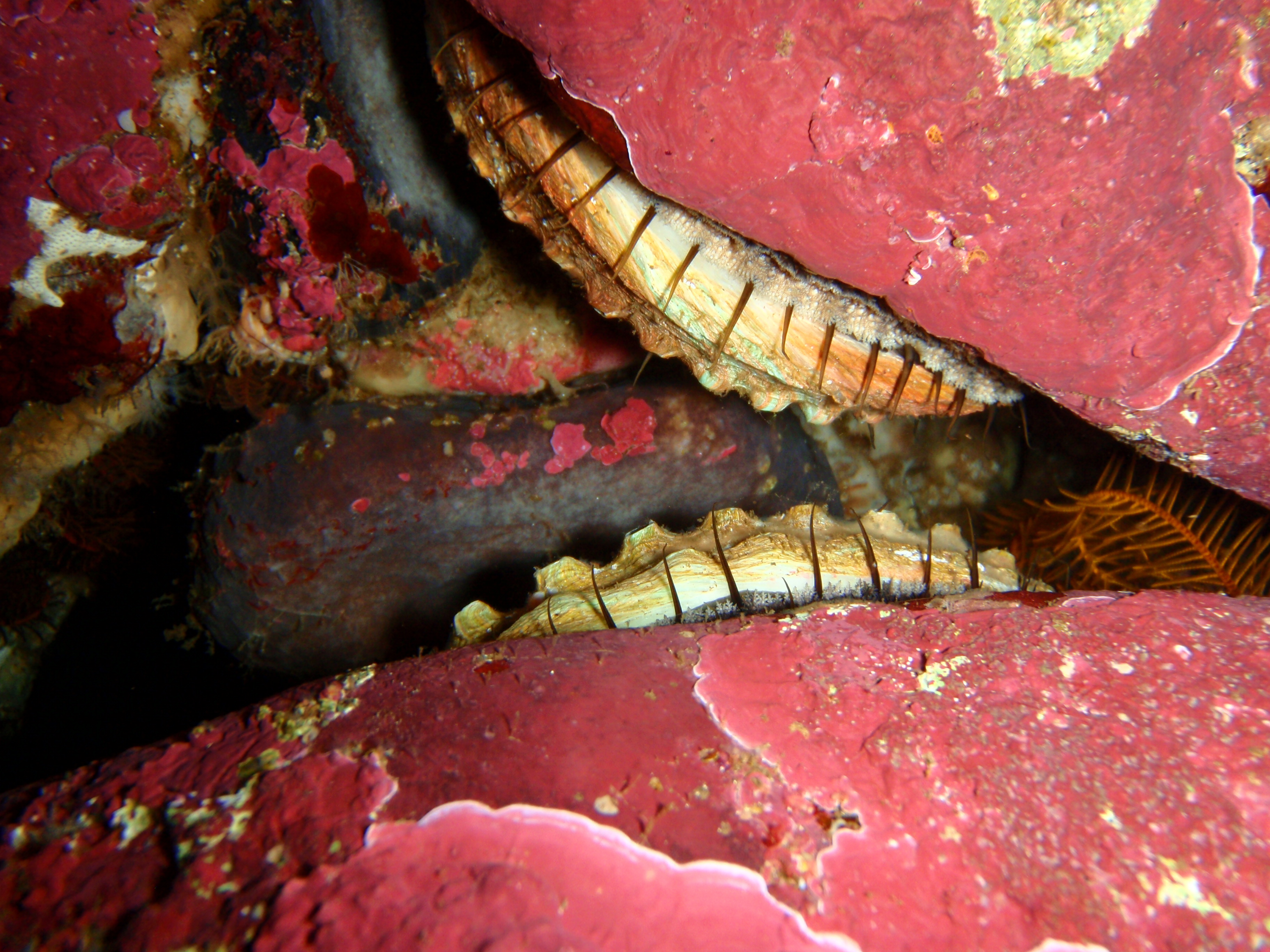
Two specimens of Haliotis rubra visible through a gap between two boulders
