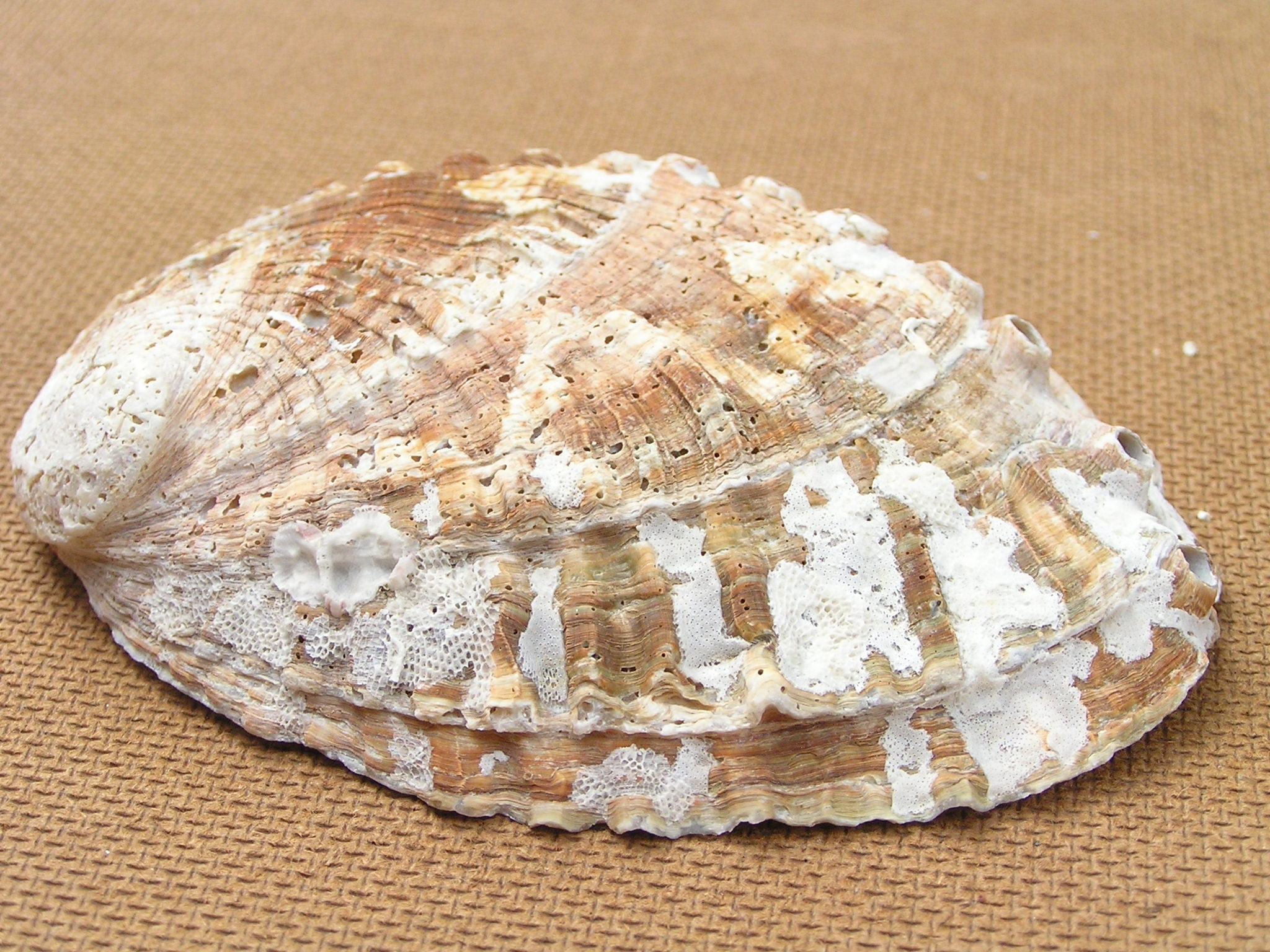
- View of a shell of Haliotis mariae

Conservation status
- Endangered (IUCN 3.1)

Scientific classification
- Kingdom: Animalia
- Phylum: Mollusca
- Class: Gastropoda
- Subclass: Vetigastropoda
- Order: Lepetellida
- Family: Haliotidae
- Genus: Haliotis
- Species: H. mariae

Binomial name
- Haliotis mariae Wood, 1828

Synonyms
- Haliotis dentata Jonas, 1844; Haliotis mariae dentata Jonas, 1846; Haliotis mariae maria Wood, 1828

= Haliotis mariae =

Species of gastropod

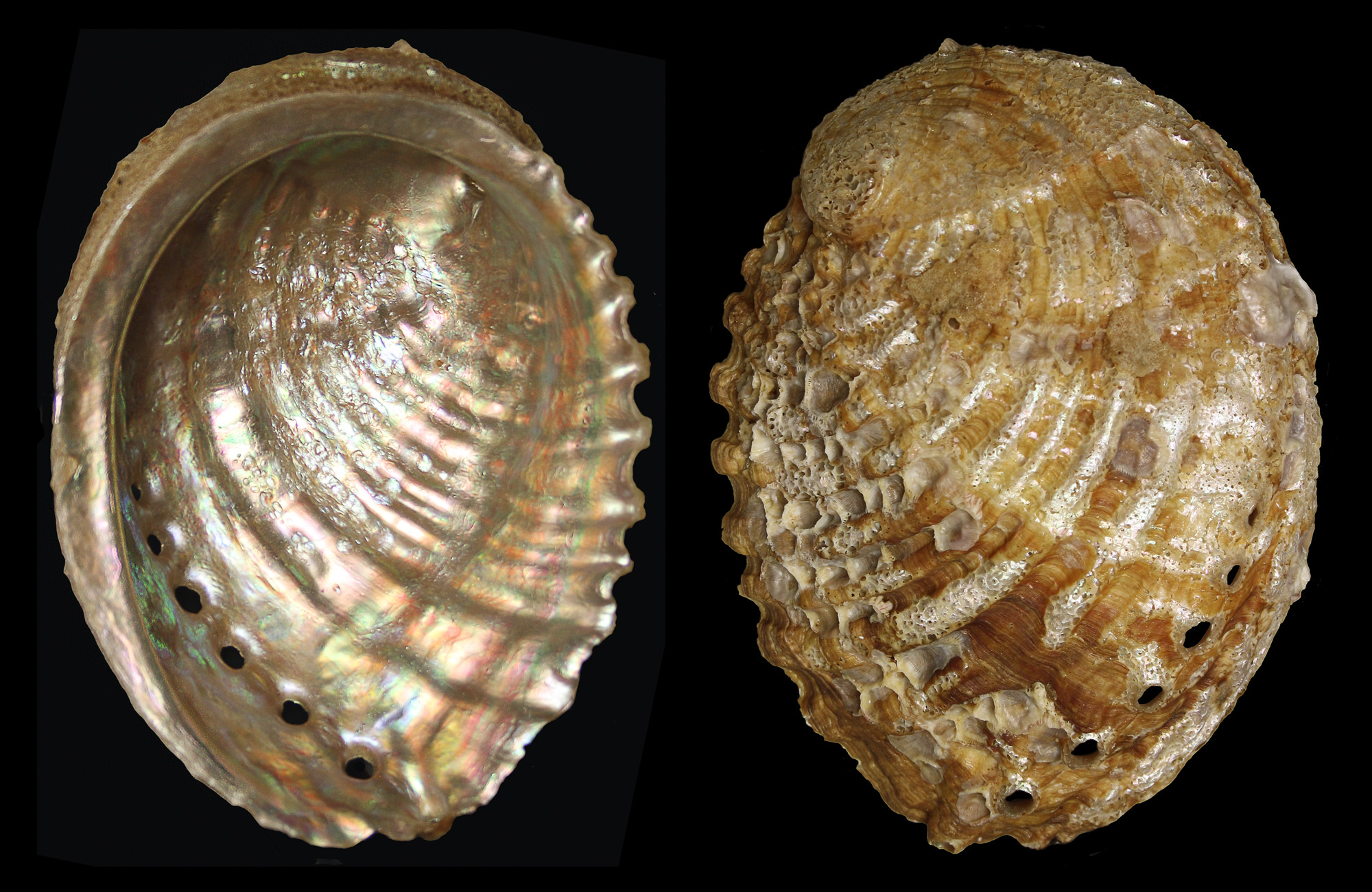
a large shell of Haliotis mariae

Haliotis mariae is a species of sea snail, a marine gastropod mollusk in the family Haliotidae, the abalones.

== Description ==
The shell grows to a size of 100 mm (3.9 in). "The large, convex shell has an oval shape. The distance of the spire from the margin is about one-fifteenth the length of the shell. The sculpture consists of very strong squarish spiral ribs, separated by wide excavated interstices. The 5 or 6 subcircular perforations are open with their edges moderately prominent..The right margin is quite convex, especially in the part of the lip adjacent to the spire. The back of the shell is convex. It is not carinated at the row of holes, but there is a shallow sulcus just below it. The color of the shell is a reddish-brown, with irregular zigzagly radiating white flames. The surface shows a variable number of very prominent unequal spiral ridges, often double, or divided by a groove in the middle. The spire is few-whorled and is not elevated near the margin, The inner surface is silvery, with red, blue and green reflections. The nacre is sulcated spirally. The columellar ledge is flattened, becoming gradually narrower below, and is not at all truncated. The very small cavity of the spire is scarcely spiral and is almost concealed by the overhanging columellar plate."

== Distribution ==
This marine species occurs off Oman and Yemen.
