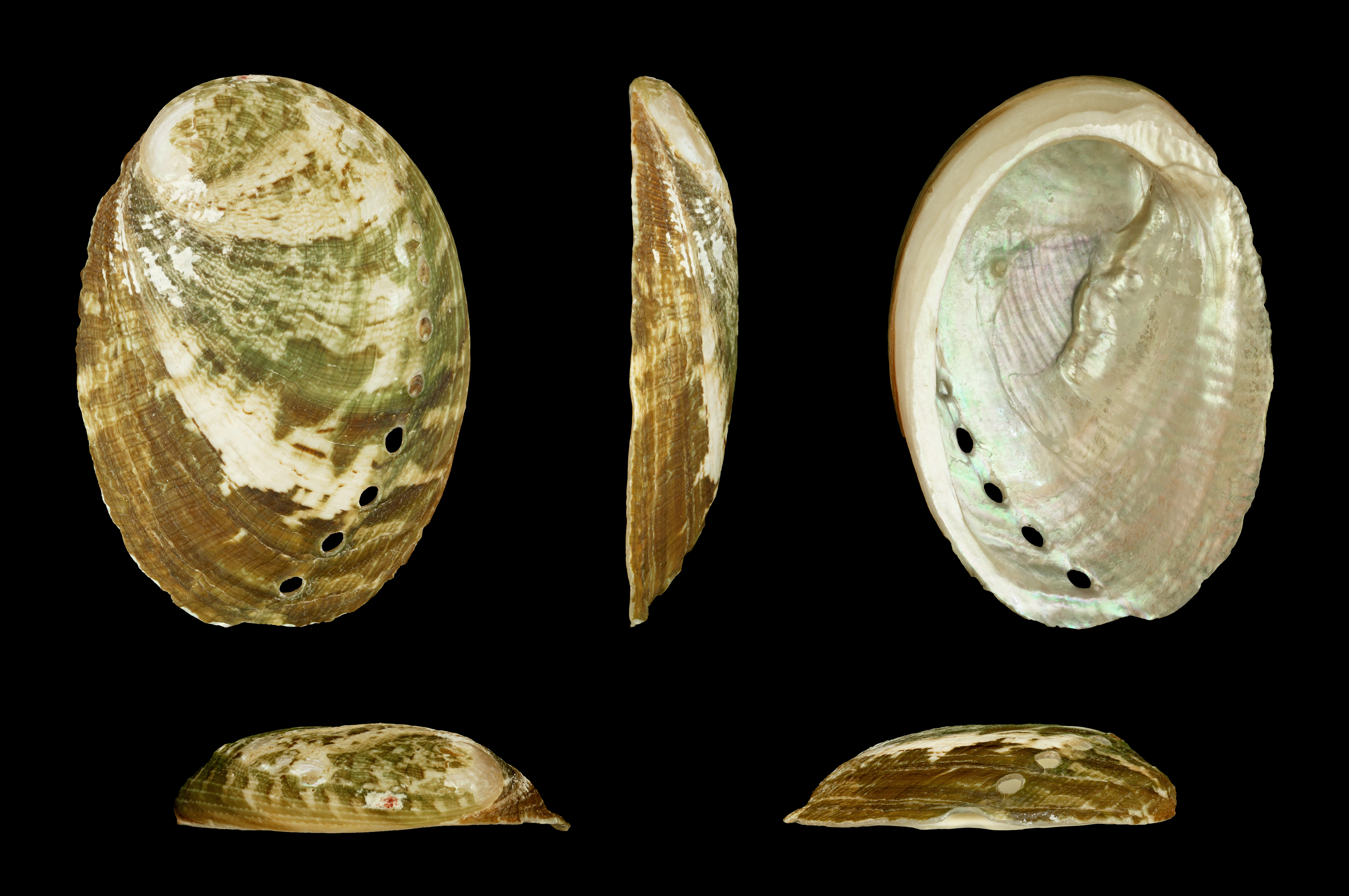
- Five views of a shell of Haliotis glabra

Conservation status
- Least Concern (IUCN 3.1)

Scientific classification
- Kingdom: Animalia
- Phylum: Mollusca
- Class: Gastropoda
- Subclass: Vetigastropoda
- Order: Lepetellida
- Family: Haliotidae
- Genus: Haliotis
- Species: H. glabra

Binomial name
- Haliotis glabra Gmelin, 1791

Synonyms
- Haliotis picta Röding, 1798; Haliotis ziczac Reeve, 1846; Haliotis (Haliotis) glabra Gmelin, 1791

= Haliotis glabra =

Species of gastropod

Haliotis glabra, commonly called glistening abalone, is a species of sea snail, a marine gastropod mollusk in the family Haliotidae, the abalones.

The homonym Haliotis glabra Swainson, 1822 is a synonym of Haliotis laevigata Donovan, 1808. Haliotis glabra Chemnitz, 1788 is unavailable. Haliotis glabra Schubert & Wagner, 1829 is a synonym of Haliotis cracherodii Leach, 1814.

== Description ==
The size of the shell varies between 25 mm and 55 mm. "The oval, depressed shell is marked with arrow-shaped olive or green spots on a lighter ground. The surface is nearly smooth. The six to eight small perforations are small., their edges not raised. The shell is oval or elliptical, with the right and left sides equally curved. The small spire is lateral, scarcely projecting above the general outline of the shell. The ground color is whitish-green, mottled and marked all over with triangular or arrow-shaped spots of green or olive. The surface is smooth, except for very light growth striae and narrow impressed spiral lines. There are a few narrow raised striae between the row of holes and the columellar margin. The inner surface is silvery and iridescent. The columellar plate is flat, wide above, gradually becoming narrower toward its base. The cavity of the spire is minute and concealed. "

== Distribution ==
This marine species occurs off the Philippines and Northern Australia.
