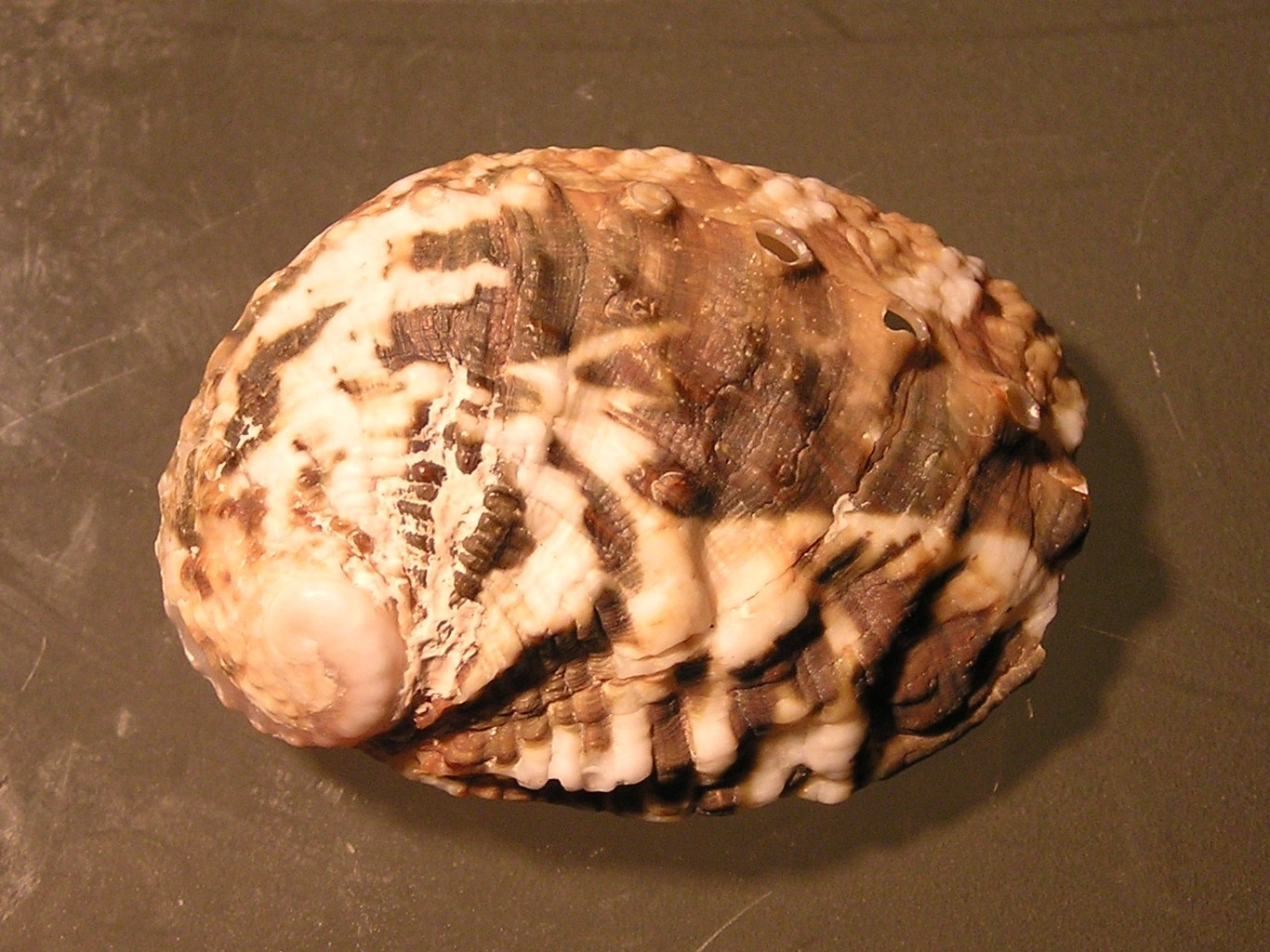
- View of a shell of Haliotis madaka

Conservation status
- Endangered (IUCN 3.1)

Scientific classification
- Kingdom: Animalia
- Phylum: Mollusca
- Class: Gastropoda
- Subclass: Vetigastropoda
- Order: Lepetellida
- Family: Haliotidae
- Genus: Haliotis
- Species: H. madaka

Binomial name
- Haliotis madaka (Habe, 1977)

Synonyms
- Nordotis madaka Habe, 1977

= Haliotis madaka =

Species of gastropod

Haliotis madaka is a species of sea snail, a marine gastropod mollusk in the family Haliotidae, the abalone.

== Description ==
The size of the shell varies between 60 mm and 246 mm. It is tan on its shell.

== Biology ==
=== Anatomy ===
The shell has a wide hole and many respiratory pores used in functions like respiration or reproduction. The shell is flat to reduce drag in the habitat of the species, coastal reefs.

=== Diet ===
This species is an herbivore.

== Distribution ==
This marine species occurs off Japan and Korea.

== See also ==
This species is similar to Haliotis discus discus, showing genome introgression in a study.
