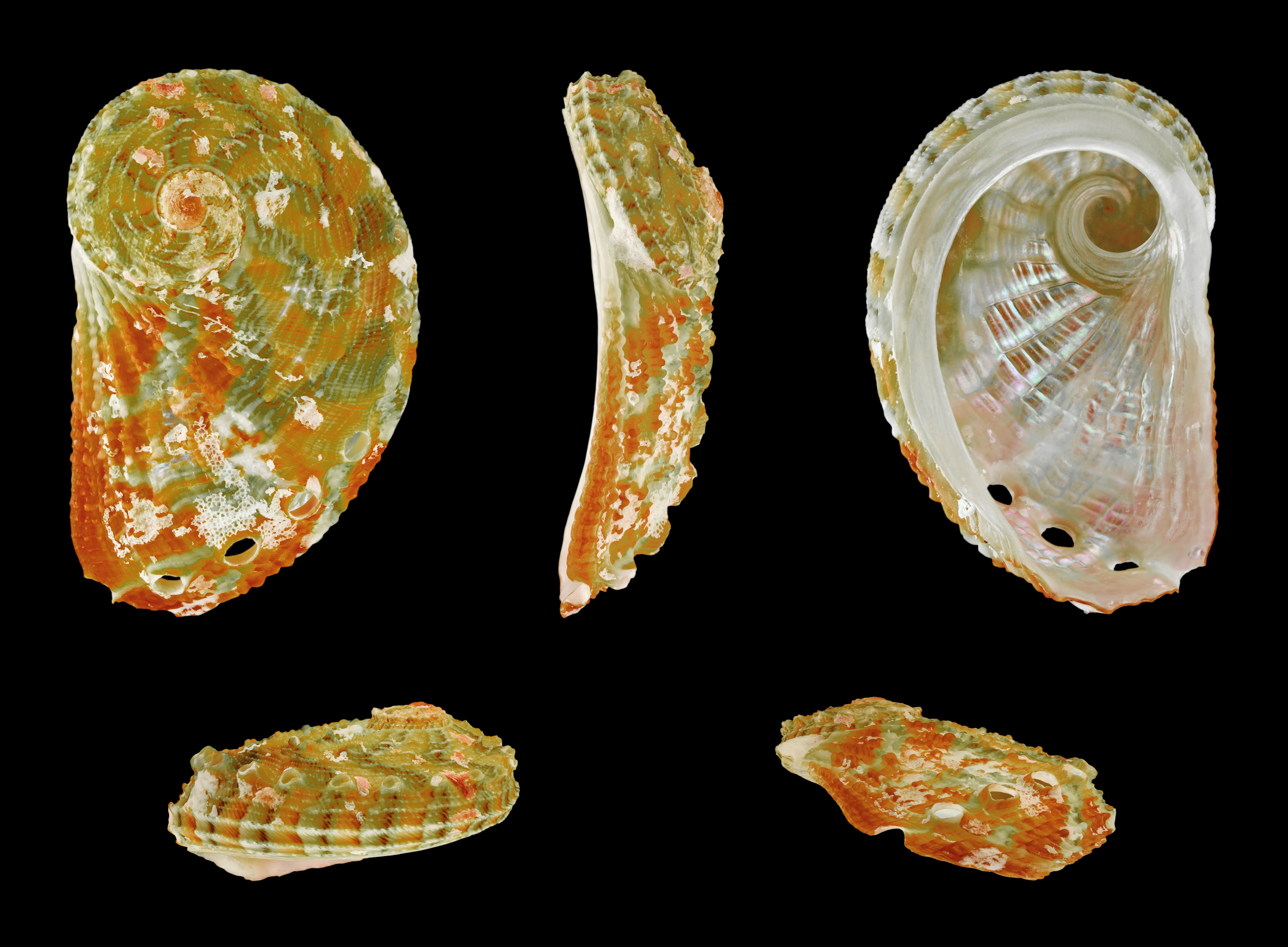
- A shell of Abalone clathrata

Conservation status
- Least Concern (IUCN 3.1)

Scientific classification
- Kingdom: Animalia
- Phylum: Mollusca
- Class: Gastropoda
- Subclass: Vetigastropoda
- Order: Lepetellida
- Family: Haliotidae
- Genus: Haliotis
- Species: H. clathrata

Binomial name
- Haliotis clathrata Reeve, 1846

Synonyms
- Haliotis (Haliotis) clathrata Reeve, 1846; Haliotis clathrata f. tomricei Patamakanthin, 2002; Haliotis naevosa Martyn; Haliotis tomricei Patamakanthin, 2002; Haliotis crebrisculpta G.B. Sowerby III, 1914; Haliotis tuvuthaensis Ladd in Ladd & Hofmeister, 1945; Haliotis venusta A. Adams & Reeve, 1848

= Haliotis clathrata =

Species of gastropod

Haliotis clathrata, common name the lovely abalone, is a species of sea snail, a marine gastropod mollusc in the family Haliotidae, the abalone.

== Description ==
The size of the shell varies between 10 mm and 60 mm. The large, solid but not thick shell has a rounded-oval shape and is much depressed. The distance of the apex measures from the margin one-fifth the length of the shell. The shell is sculptured with fine spiral cords cut by close minute striae of increment and has radiating waves or folds above. A slight angle at the row of perforations, below it is broadly excavated and then carinated. The about six perforations are elevated and circular. The outline is suborbicular and much depressed. The color pattern of the surface is either dark red with few radiating angular white patches, or dull red and green, streaked and mottled. The spiral cords of the outer surface are either nearly equal or have slightly larger ones at wide intervals. They are decussated by close growth-striae. The whorls number a trifle over three. The inner surface is corrugated like the outer surface, silvery, very brilliantly iridescent. The reflections are chiefly sea-green and red. The columellar plate is broad, flat, and obliquely truncated at its base. The cavity of the spire is wide, open, but shallow. This is a variable form, in color varying from dark coral red to dull red streaked with pale green. This species also occurs in a different form: Haliotis clathrata f. tomricei (Patamakanthin, 2002).

The shape of the shell forms a logarithmic spiral with an expansion coefficient of 0.25, which is close to the 0.31 coefficient of a golden spiral, although shells exist with a wide range of coefficients and this proximity is of no particular significance.

== Distribution ==
This marine species occurs in the western Pacific Ocean, on the coasts of including Australia and the islands and mainland of Southeast Asia, as well as islands in the Indian Ocean such as Madagascar and Mauritius and stretches of the East African coast.
