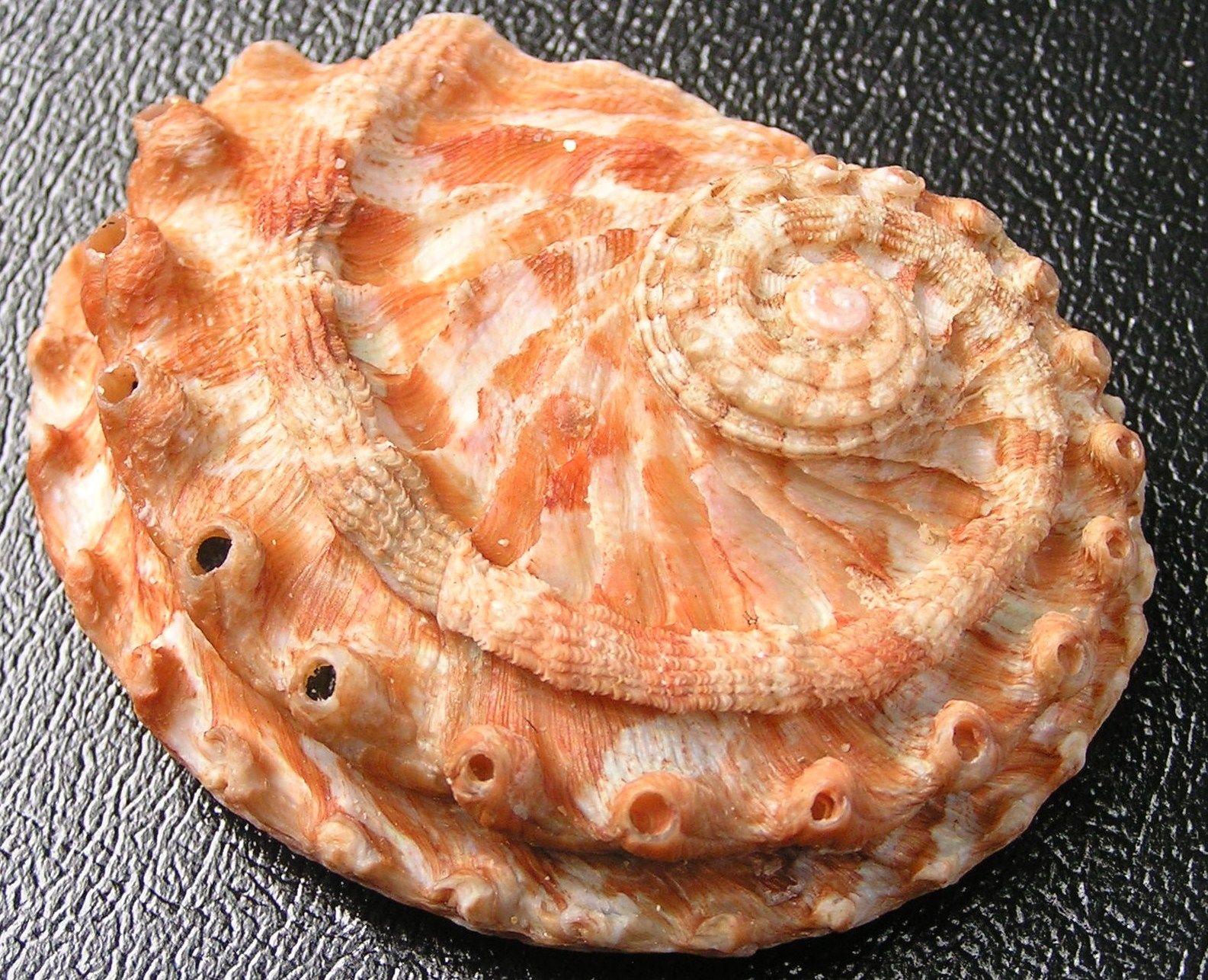
- Apical view of a shell of Haliotis scalaris

Conservation status
- Least Concern (IUCN 3.1)

Scientific classification
- Kingdom: Animalia
- Phylum: Mollusca
- Class: Gastropoda
- Subclass: Vetigastropoda
- Order: Lepetellida
- Family: Haliotidae
- Genus: Haliotis
- Species: H. scalaris

Binomial name
- Haliotis scalaris (Leach, 1814)

Synonyms
- Haliotis rubicundus Gray, J.E., 1826; Haliotis (Haliotis) crenata Swainson, W.A., 1822; Haliotis (Haliotis) tricostalis Lamarck, J.B.P.A. de, 1822; Haliotis (Haliotis) tricostata Wood, S.V., 1828; Padollus scalaris Leach, 1814 (original combination); Padollus tricostalis H. & A. Adams

= Haliotis scalaris =

Species of gastropod

Haliotis scalaris, common name the staircase abalone or the ridged ear abalone, is a species of sea snail, a marine gastropod mollusk in the family Haliotidae, the abalone.

Subspecies

- Haliotis scalaris emmae Reeve, 1846
- Haliotis scalaris scalaris (Leach, 1814)

== Description ==
The size of the shell varies between 60 mm and 100 mm. "The depressed shell has a rounded-oval shape, showing a strong spiral rib on each side of the row of 5 to 6 open perforations, and prominent elevated radiating lamellae around the spire. The shell is moderately large but thin, of the depressed, irregularly oval shape. Its color pattern is reddish or variegated olive and green. The surface has a strong rounded ridge inside of the row of elevated tubular holes, and a smaller, nodose ridge outside of it. Above it is finely striated spirally, and with coarse raised lamellae between the spire and the inner spiral rib. Its inner surface is silvery and very iridescent, with excavations corresponding to the elevations of the outer surface. The columellar plate is narrow, and obliquely truncated below."

== Distribution ==
This marine species is endemic to Australia and occurs from South West (Western Australia) to Victoria including Tasmania.
