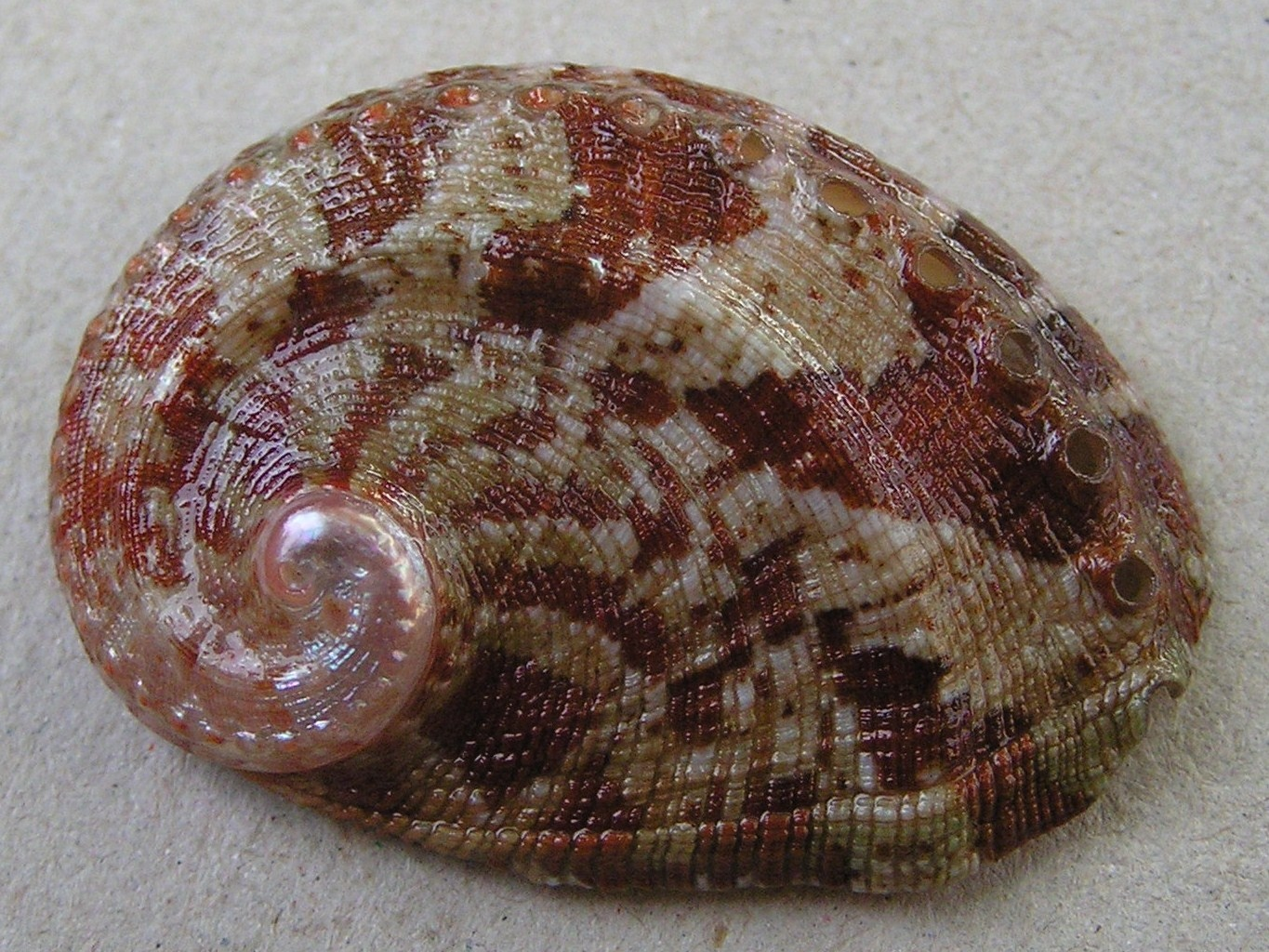
- Dorsal view of a shell of Haliotis parva
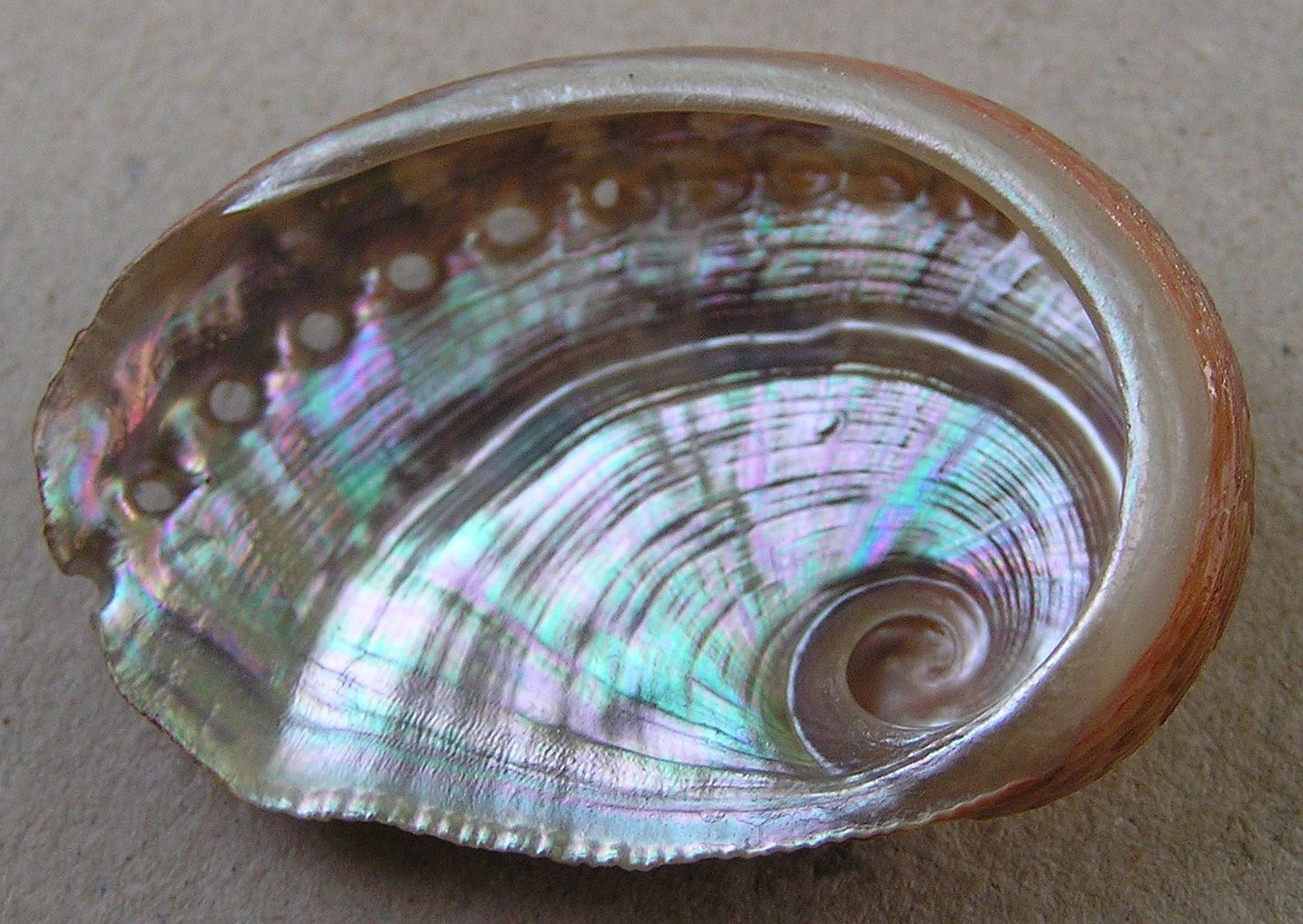
- Ventral view of a shell of Haliotis parva

Conservation status
- Data Deficient (IUCN 3.1)

Scientific classification
- Kingdom: Animalia
- Phylum: Mollusca
- Class: Gastropoda
- Subclass: Vetigastropoda
- Order: Lepetellida
- Superfamily: Haliotoidea
- Family: Haliotidae
- Genus: Haliotis
- Species: H. parva

Binomial name
- Haliotis parva Linnaeus, 1758

Synonyms
- Haliotis canaliculata Lamarck, 1822; Haliotis canaliculata Fischer von Waldheim, 1807; Haliotis carinata Swainson, 1822; Haliotis cingulata Röding, 1798; Haliotis kraussi Turton, 1932; Haliotis rubicunda Röding, 1798; Haliotis rubicunda (Montfort, 1810); Padollus rubicundus Montfort, 1810

= Haliotis parva =

Species of gastropod

Haliotis parva, common name the canaliculate abalone, is a species of sea snail, a marine gastropod mollusk in the family Haliotidae, the abalone.

Haliotis parva was among the first seven haliotids named by Carl Linnaeus (together with Haliotis asinina, Haliotis marmorata, Haliotis midae, Haliotis striata, Haliotis tuberculata and Haliotis varia).

== Description ==
The size of the shell varies between 25 mm and 50 mm. "The rather small shell is oval and depressed. It has a strong rounded rib on the upper surface, parallel with the row of holes. The surface of the shell is covered all over with fine closer spiral threads and much finer radiating striae. The form varies from elliptical to rounded-oval. The spiral rib of the upper surface is also variable in prominence. There are no radiating lamellae between the spire and the rib, and as usual there is a shallow channel outside of the row of holes. The colour is between scarlet and brick-red, with irregular, often radiating white patches. The spire is raised and rather prominent. The inner surface is silvery, with red and green reflections. It has a furrow corresponding to the rib of the outside. The columellar shelf is narrow and flattened. The six perforations are subcircular and open."

== Distribution ==
This species occurs in the Atlantic Ocean from Southern Angola to South Africa.
