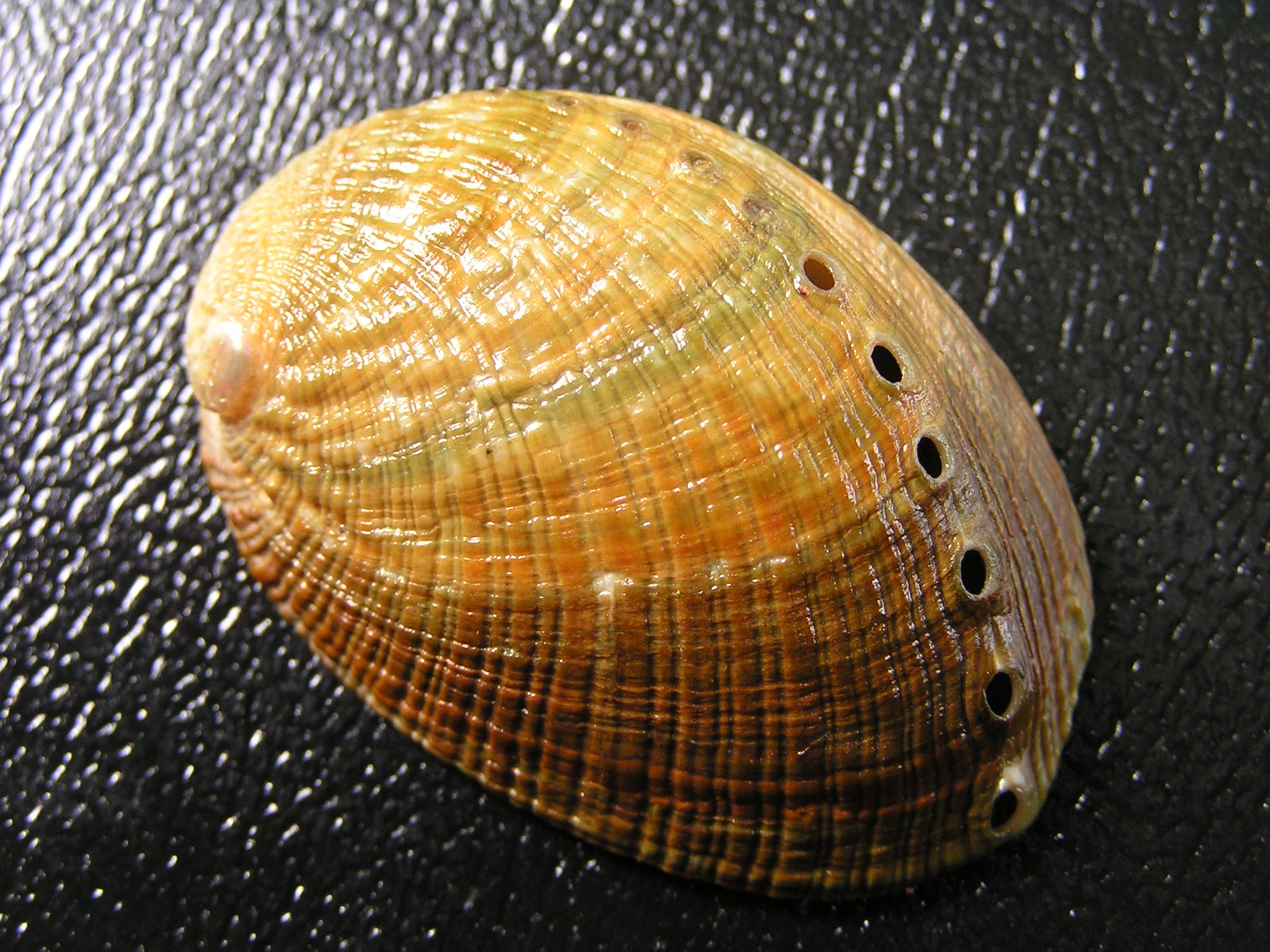
- Dorsal view of a shell of H. walallensis

Conservation status
- Critically Endangered (IUCN 3.1)

Scientific classification
- Kingdom: Animalia
- Phylum: Mollusca
- Class: Gastropoda
- Subclass: Vetigastropoda
- Order: Lepetellida
- Family: Haliotidae
- Genus: Haliotis
- Species: H. walallensis

Binomial name
- Haliotis walallensis Stearns, 1899

Synonyms
- Haliotis fulgens var. walallensis Stearns, 1899

= Haliotis walallensis =

Species of gastropod

Haliotis walallensis, common name the flat abalone, is a species of sea snail, a marine gastropod mollusk in the family Haliotidae, abalone.

== Description ==
The size of the shell reaches 120 mm.

== Distribution ==
This marine species occurs in the Pacific Ocean from British Columbia to Southern California.
