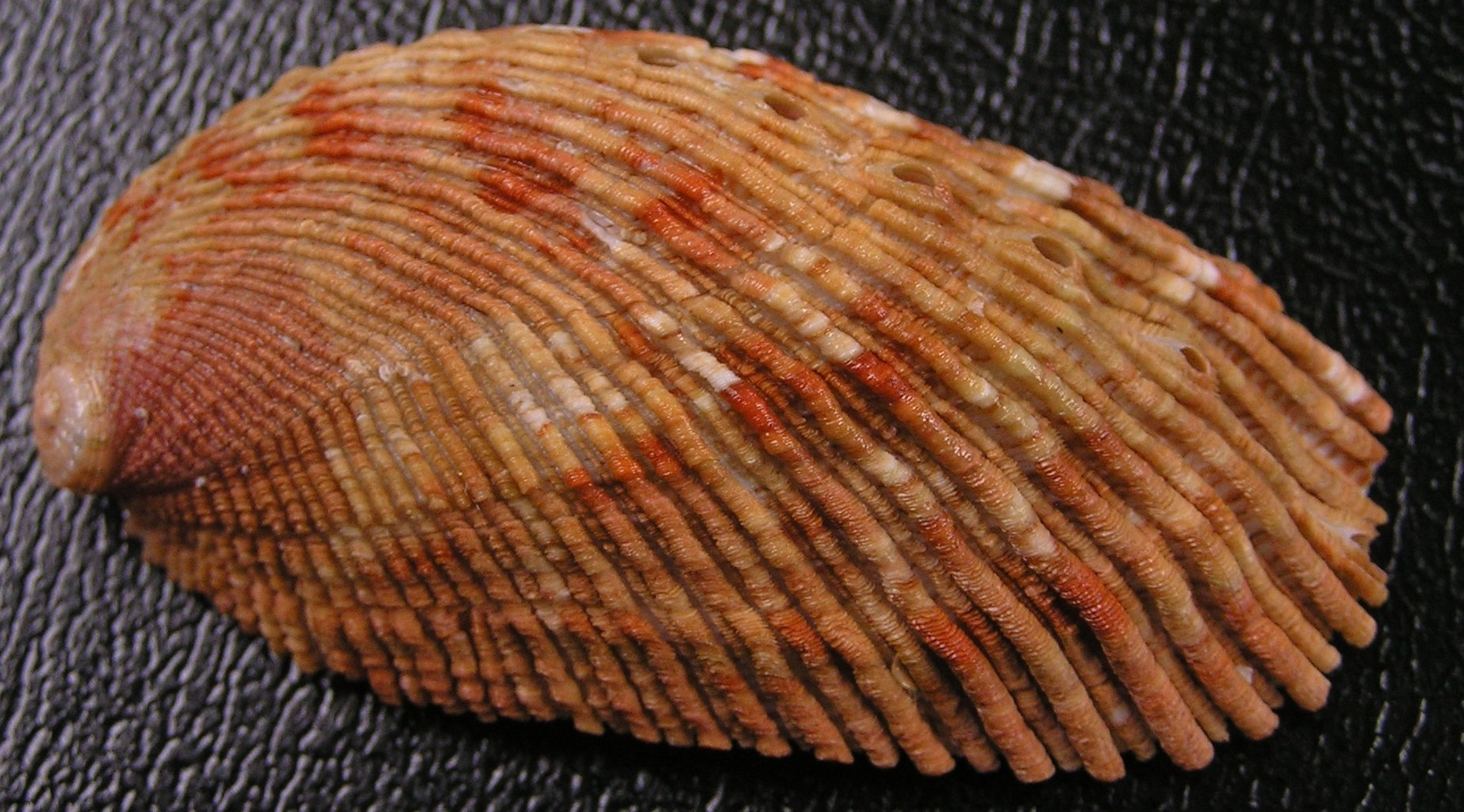
- View of a shell of Haliotis elegans

Conservation status
- Least Concern (IUCN 3.1)

Scientific classification
- Kingdom: Animalia
- Phylum: Mollusca
- Class: Gastropoda
- Subclass: Vetigastropoda
- Order: Lepetellida
- Superfamily: Haliotoidea
- Family: Haliotidae
- Genus: Haliotis
- Species: H. elegans

Binomial name
- Haliotis elegans Koch in Philippi, 1844

Synonyms
- Haliotis (Haliotis) elegans Philippi, R.A., 1844; Haliotis clathrata Lichtenstein, 1794 (invalid)

= Haliotis elegans =

Species of gastropod

Haliotis elegans, common name the elegant abalone, is a species of sea snail, a marine gastropod mollusk in the family Haliotidae, the abalone.

== Description ==
The size of the shell varies between 70 mm and 100 mm. "The elongated shell is rather narrow, subtruncate at its base, spirally densely and deeply sulcate. Its color pattern is ferruginous-buff, marbled and flamed with red. The inner surface is lightly grooved and brilliantly pearly. The spire is very short.

This beautiful and rare mollusk is distinguished as well by its long drawn out form as by the shining nacre, which shows furrows corresponding to the ribs of the outer surface. The outer surface is closely and deeply furrowed by rough, prominent spiral ribs. These are closely scaly, and often between two thicker ones there is a weaker lower riblet. A few folds in the direction of growth striae make the surface still rougher, and are also visible on the inside. The color is a dirty yellowish-brown, flamed and marbled with reddish-brown, especially in young individuals."

== Distribution ==
H. elegans is endemic to the waters off Western Australia.
