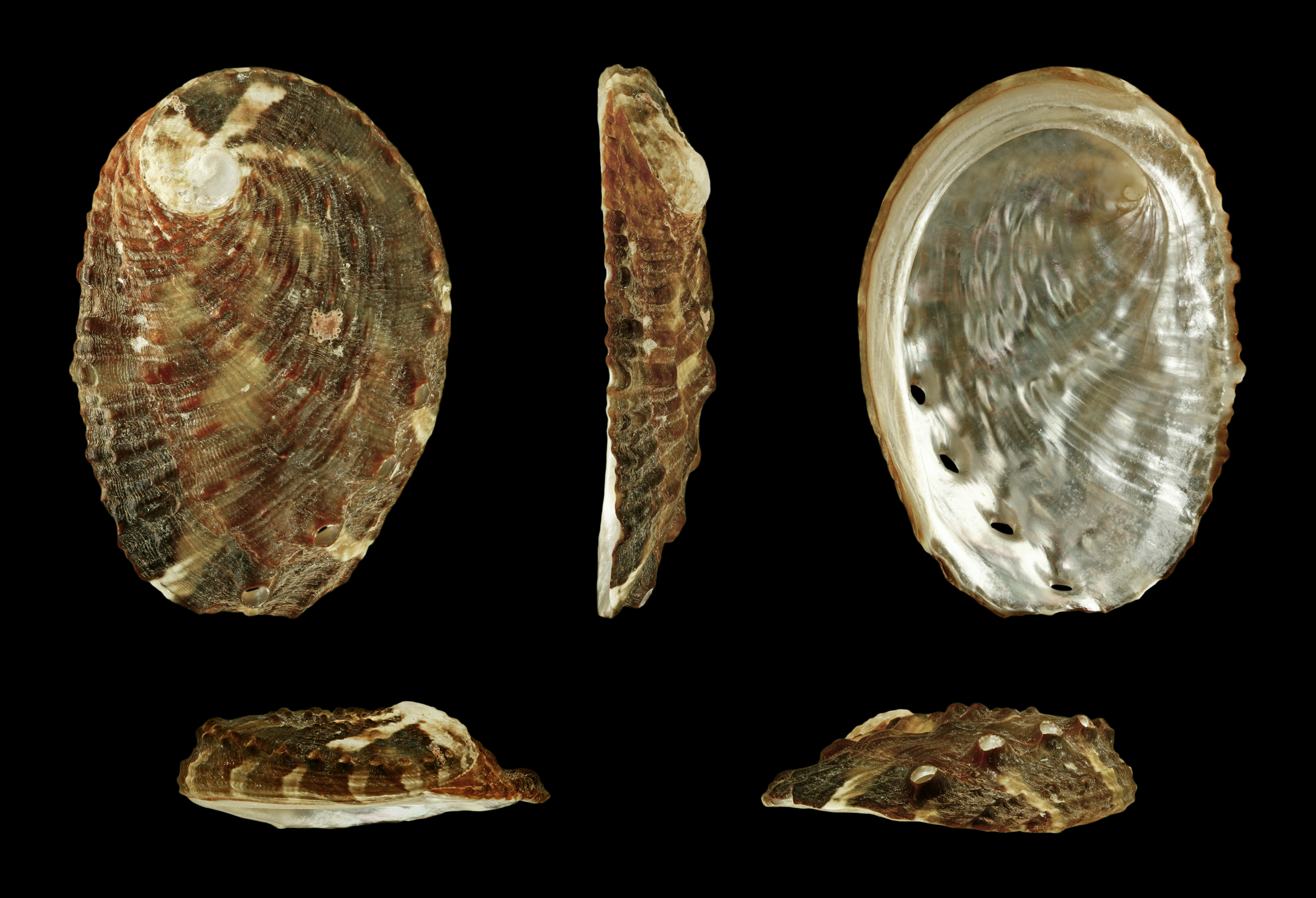
- Apical view of a shell of Haliotis planata

Conservation status
- Least Concern (IUCN 3.1)

Scientific classification
- Kingdom: Animalia
- Phylum: Mollusca
- Class: Gastropoda
- Subclass: Vetigastropoda
- Order: Lepetellida
- Superfamily: Haliotoidea
- Family: Haliotidae
- Genus: Haliotis
- Species: H. planata

Binomial name
- Haliotis planata G.B. Sowerby II, 1882

Synonyms
- Haliotis grayana G.B. Sowerby II, 1882

= Haliotis planata =

Species of gastropod

Haliotis planata, common name the planate abalone, is a species of sea snail, a marine gastropod mollusk in the family Haliotidae, the abalone.

== Description ==
The size of the shell varies between 20 mm and 40 mm. "The very flat, solid shell has an oval shape. The spire is not at all raised. The distance of the apex from the nearest margin is about one-sixth the length of the shell. The surface is sculptured with numerous uneven spiral cords. The outline is oval. It is very much depressed, flatter than any other haliotid species. Outside it is chocolate brown stained in places with green, having oblique, branching streaks of cream-white, or blotches of the same tint. The sculpture consists of numerous spiral cords separated by deep grooves. The cords are more or less nodose from the intersection of uneven radiating folds, often obscure. Toward the lower end, outside of the row of holes, the cords are obviously scaly or granose. Spire plane, generally eroded and white. The inner surface is silvery, iridescent, and spirally grooved. The columellar plate is very wide above, flat, not quite covering the small spire-cavity. The open perforations number four to five. They are small, oval, their edges a trifle raised."

== Distribution ==
This marine species occurs from the Eastern Indian to western Pacific, from Sri Lanka, the Andaman Islands and Nicobar Islands to Fiji; and off Western Australia.
