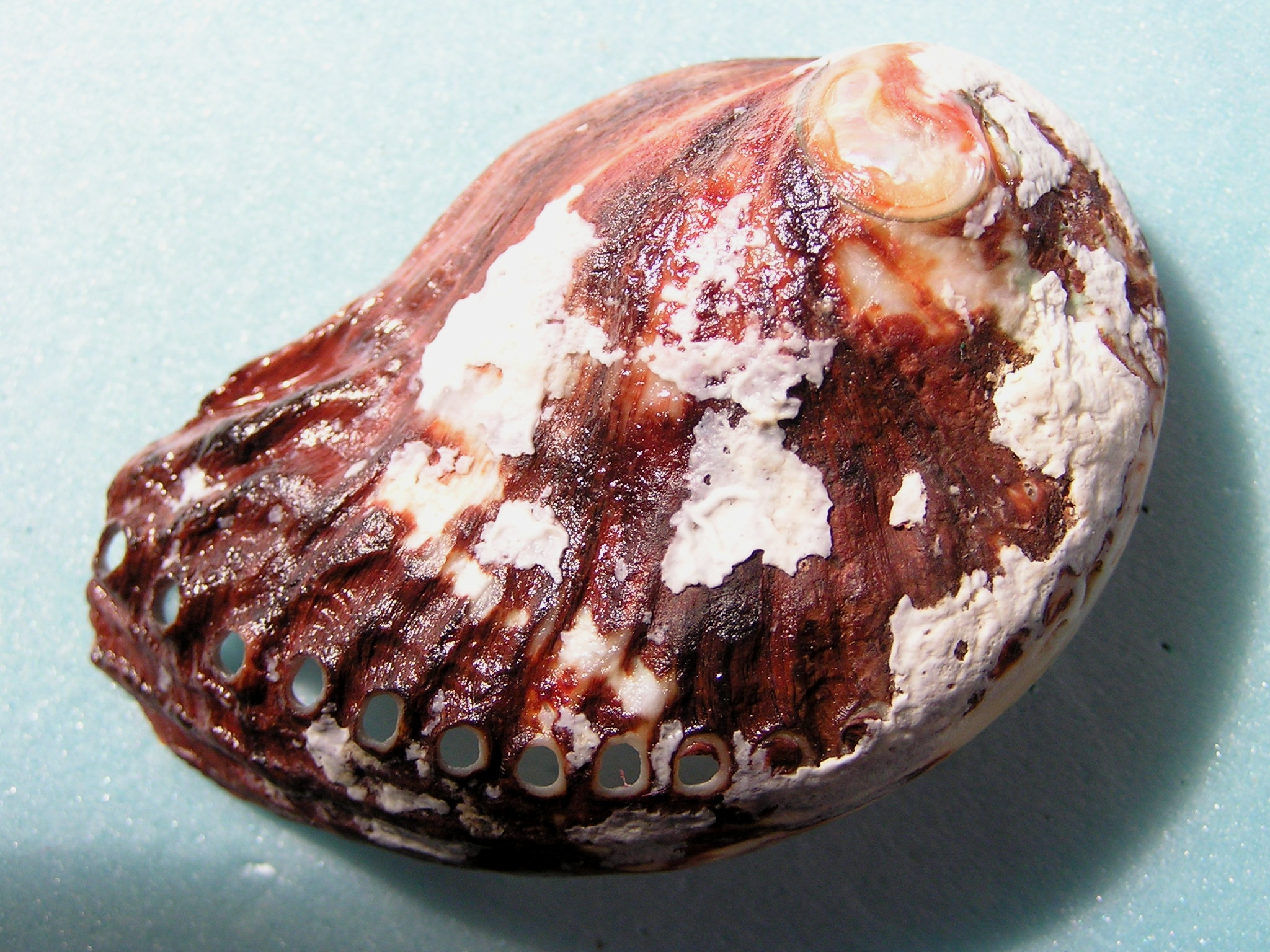
- Apical view of a shell of Haliotis spadicea

Conservation status
- Least Concern (IUCN 3.1)

Scientific classification
- Kingdom: Animalia
- Phylum: Mollusca
- Class: Gastropoda
- Subclass: Vetigastropoda
- Order: Lepetellida
- Superfamily: Haliotoidea
- Family: Haliotidae
- Genus: Haliotis
- Species: H. spadicea

Binomial name
- Haliotis spadicea Donovan, 1808

Synonyms
- Haliotis ficiformis Menke, 1844; Haliotis sanguinea Hanley, 1840; Haliotis sinuata Perry, 1811

= Haliotis spadicea =

Species of gastropod

The blood-spotted abalone (Haliotis spadicea) is a species of edible sea snail, a marine gastropod mollusk in the family Haliotidae, the abalone. This species is common on rocky shores on the coast of South Africa.

== Shell description ==
The exterior of the shell of this species is reddish-purple in color, often with some white blotches. The shell has between 5 and 8 open respiratory pores along the margin. These holes collectively make up what is known as the selenizone which form as the shell grows. The snail shell grows to approximately 70 millimetres (2.8 in) in length.

"The depressed shell has an oblong-ovate shape, narrowed toward the anterior end. The distance of the apex from the margin is contained 7 or 8 times in the length of the shell. The spiral striae, when visible, are very indistinct but contain radiating, coarse, oblique folds. The left margin is regularly arcuate, the right one straightened, a little concave along the middle part of the outer lip. The shell is solid but rather thin, dark reddish-brown, variegated with blotches of snowy white, especially in the young. The spire is often of a peculiar bronze red. The surface contains a few impressed spiral striae, often scarcely visible, and low, very irregular undulations or radiating folds. These, too, are often subobsolete. The shell is not strongly carinated at the position of the row of perforations in adults. And there are several rather strong cords revolving parallel with the holes, between them and the columellar margin. The low spire is composed of about three whorls. The inner surface is brilliantly pearly. The columellar plate is narrow. Its edge is rounded, convex, sloping outward, and obliquely truncated below. The cavity of the spire is visible from below. It is rather deep, usually of a beautiful red-bronze color inside."

"The more prominent characters are the peculiar form, narrowed at the anterior end, the reddish or chocolate surface, smooth except for radiating folds, and the coppery red stain within the cavity of the spire. This last feature is sometimes absent. The perforations are numerous, close together and almost perfectly circular. The columellar shelf or plate slopes outward, is rather narrow and convex on its face. The shell when placed upon a plane surface, rests upon its two extremities, both lips being arched. The apex is nearer to the margin than in Haliotis midae, another Cape species, with which this one agrees in lacking spiral striation."

== Distribution ==
This species occurs in the Indian Ocean off South Africa.

== Human use ==
The meat of this abalone is edible, and has been consumed by people living along the coast in the past, although abalone fishing is now banned in South Africa.
