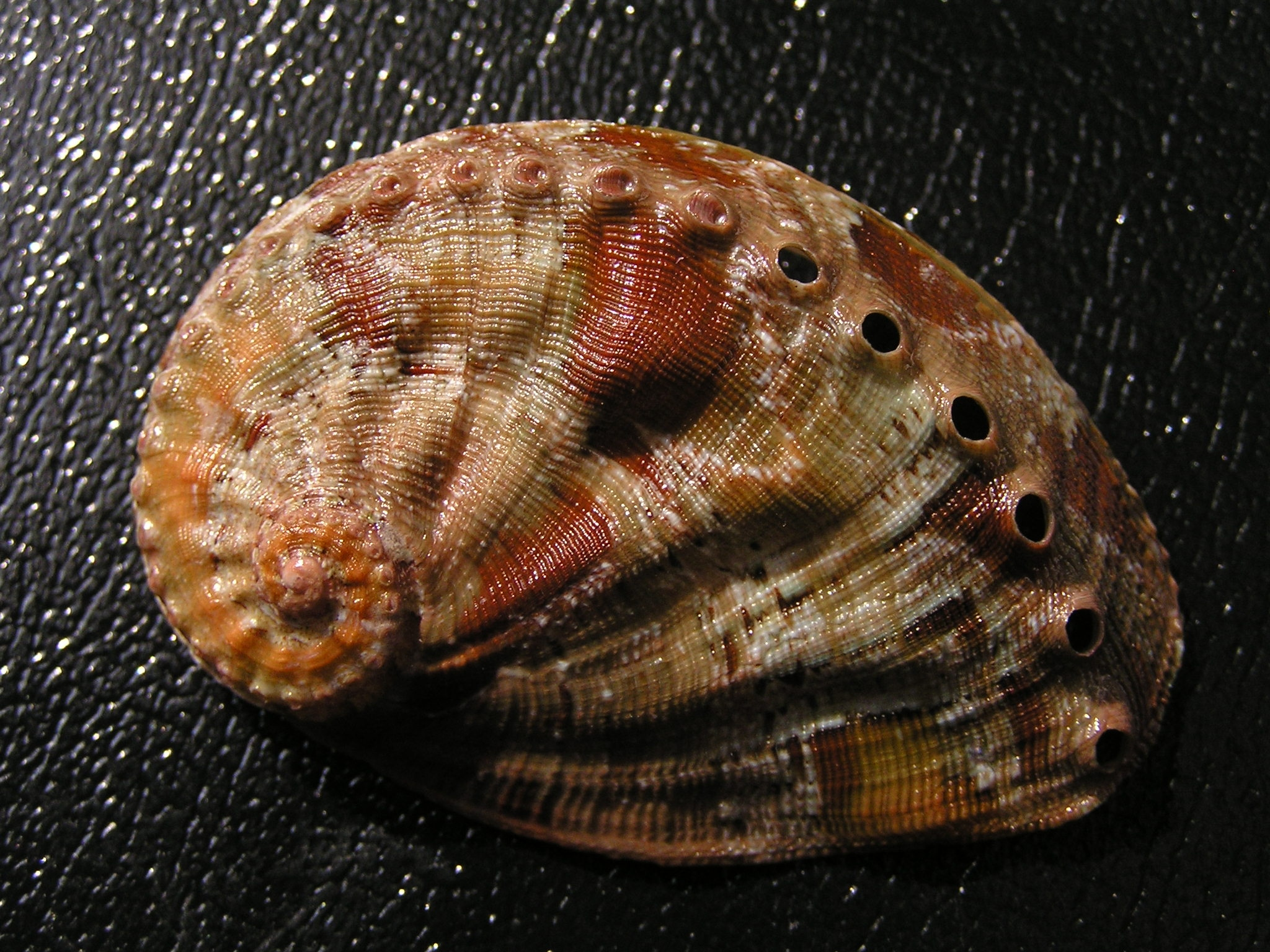
- Apical view of a shell of Haliotis semiplicata

Conservation status
- Least Concern (IUCN 3.1)

Scientific classification
- Kingdom: Animalia
- Phylum: Mollusca
- Class: Gastropoda
- Subclass: Vetigastropoda
- Order: Lepetellida
- Family: Haliotidae
- Genus: Haliotis
- Species: H. semiplicata

Binomial name
- Haliotis semiplicata Menke, 1843

Synonyms
- Haliotis lauta Reeve, 1846

= Haliotis semiplicata =

Species of gastropod

Haliotis semiplicata, common name the semiplicate abalone, is a species of sea snail, a marine gastropod mollusk in the family Haliotidae, the abalone.

== Description ==
The size of the shell varies between 30 mm and 60 mm.

== Distribution ==
This marine species occurs off Western Australia.
