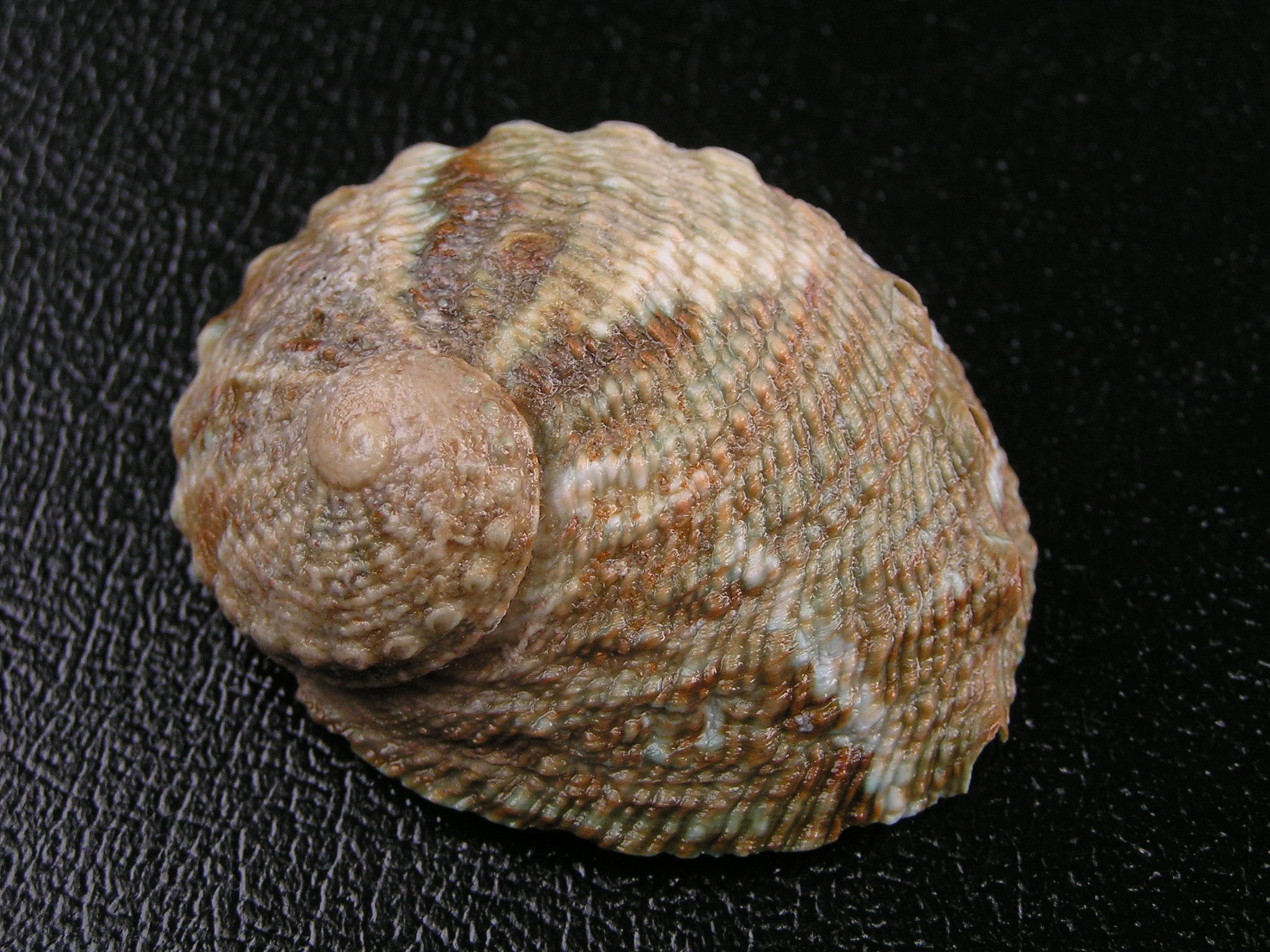
- Dorsal view of a shell of H. cyclobates

Conservation status
- Least Concern (IUCN 3.1)

Scientific classification
- Kingdom: Animalia
- Phylum: Mollusca
- Class: Gastropoda
- Subclass: Vetigastropoda
- Order: Lepetellida
- Family: Haliotidae
- Genus: Haliotis
- Species: H. cyclobates

Binomial name
- Haliotis cyclobates Péron, 1816

Synonyms
- Haliotis excavata Lamarck, 1822

= Haliotis cyclobates =

Species of gastropod

Haliotis cyclobates, common name the whirling abalone or the circular ear shell, is a species of sea snail, a marine gastropod mollusk in the family Haliotidae, the abalone.

== Description ==
The size of the shell attains 60 mm. "The elevated shell is nearly circular in outline and somewhat turbinate. The distance of the apex from the margin is between one-third and one-fourth the diameter of the shell. The body whorl is rounded and convex above. The surface is covered with spiral cords and threads, and has numerous folds radiating from the suture. The five perforations are oval, not raised. The shell is nearly circular and very convex. The spire is decidedly elevated and is formed of about three rounded whorls. The last whorl has a blunt keel at the row of holes, and a narrower, more acute carina at a short distance below it. The space between both is a little concave. The entire surface has close spiral cords and threads which are sometimes somewhat granose. There are numerous folds radiating from the suture, but not long enough to reach the periphery. The coloration consists of broad radiating patches or oblique stripes of chestnut-brown, green and flesh-color or whitish. The inner surface is silvery with red and green reflections. The muscle impression is not distinct. The columellar plate is flat, not truncate below, strongly sloping inward. The generally five perforations are oval, their edges only a trifle raised."

== Distribution ==
This marine species is endemic to Australia and occurs off South Australia, Victoria and Western Australia.
