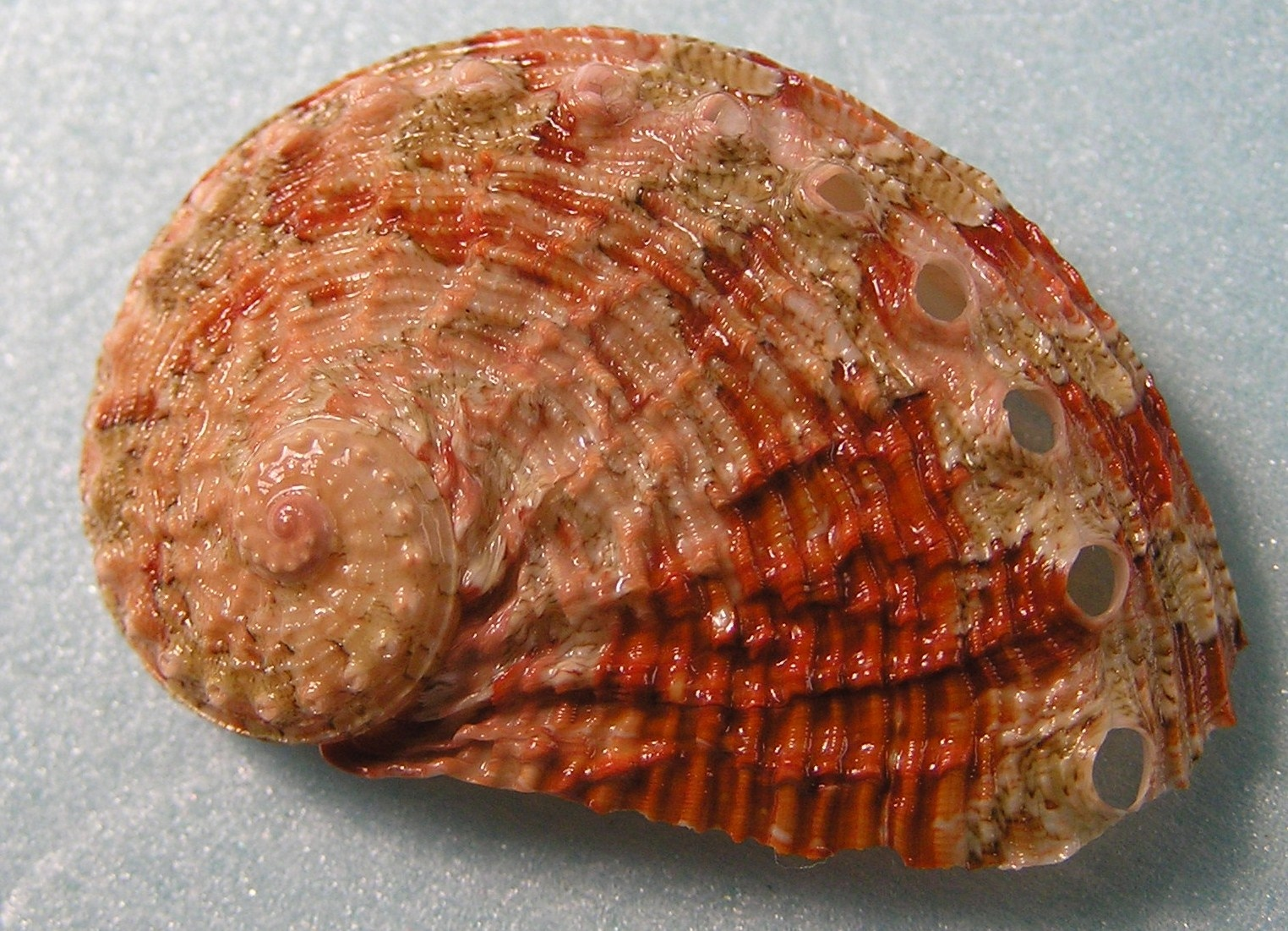
- View of a shell of Haliotis squamosa

Conservation status
- Data Deficient (IUCN 3.1)

Scientific classification
- Kingdom: Animalia
- Phylum: Mollusca
- Class: Gastropoda
- Subclass: Vetigastropoda
- Order: Lepetellida
- Family: Haliotidae
- Genus: Haliotis
- Species: H. squamosa

Binomial name
- Haliotis squamosa Gray, 1826

Synonyms
- Haliotis crebrisculpta G.B. Sowerby III, 1914; Haliotis roedingi Menke, 1844

= Haliotis squamosa =

Species of gastropod

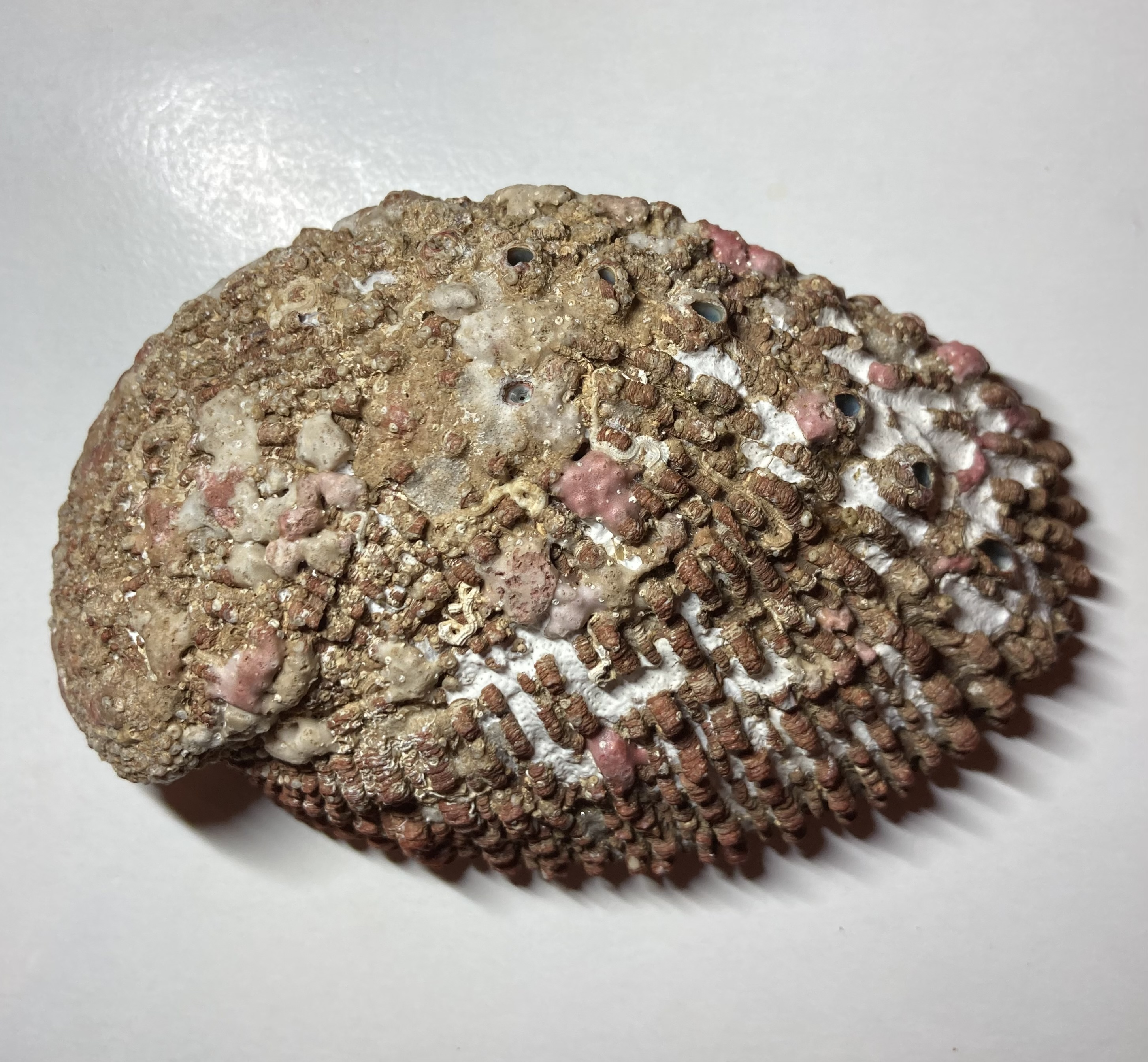
Large Haliotis squamosa shell (with epizoa) from near Tolagnaro (Fort-Dauphin), Madagascar. Length of 95.5 mm.

Haliotis squamosa, common name the squamose abalone, is a species of sea snail, a marine gastropod mollusk in the family Haliotidae, the abalone.

== Description ==
The size of the shell varies between 40 mm and 90 mm. "The shell has an oblong-ovate shape, transversely obliquely wrinkled and spirally tubularly ribbed. The tubercles are scale-like. The ribs are sometimes close, sometimes with a fine ridge running between them. The seven, open perforations are rather large. The exterior is spotted and variegated with yellow and orange-brown. The interior surface is whitish and iridescent.

This is an extremely interesting species, well characterized by its close ribs of scale-like tubercles, ranging across the shell in oblique waves. In the middle portion of the shell there is a fine ridge running between the ribs. The color is also peculiar, a kind of burnt-umberstained orange."

== Distribution ==
This species occurs in the Indian Ocean off southern Madagascar. Gray erroneously described the species to occur off Australia.
