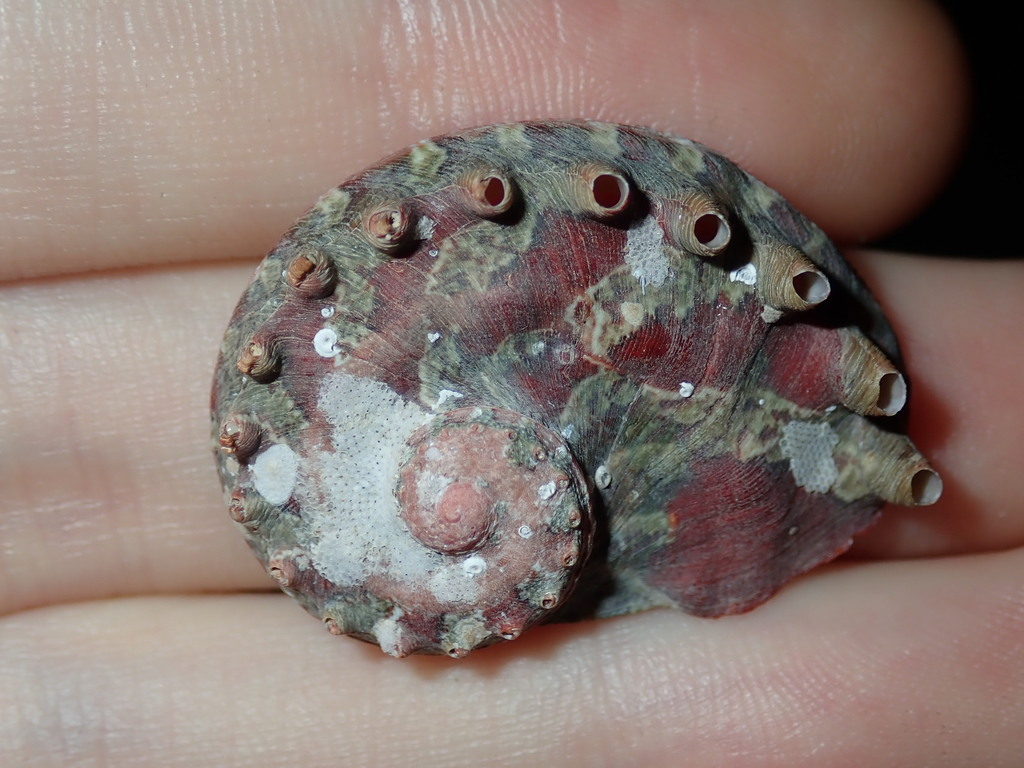
- Haliotis brazieri shell from Sydney

Conservation status
- Near Threatened (IUCN 3.1)

Scientific classification
- Kingdom: Animalia
- Phylum: Mollusca
- Class: Gastropoda
- Subclass: Vetigastropoda
- Order: Lepetellida
- Family: Haliotidae
- Genus: Haliotis
- Species: H. brazieri

Binomial name
- Haliotis brazieri Angas, 1869

Synonyms
- Haliotis brazieri f. hargravesi Cox, 1869; Haliotis hargravesi Cox, 1869; Haliotis melculus (Iredale, 1927); Haliotis (Padollus) brazieri Angas, 1869; Marinauris brazieri (Angas, 1869); Marinauris hargravesi (Cox, 1869)

= Haliotis brazieri =

Species of gastropod

Haliotis brazieri, common name Brazier's ear shell, is a species of sea snail, a marine gastropod mollusk in the family Haliotidae, the abalones.

== Description ==
"The size of the shell varies between 25 mm and 70 mm. The small shell is rounded, oval and flattened. The surface is smooth except for a strong rounded rib revolving midway between the spire and the row of perforations, and fine, hairlike growth striae all over. The 4 to 6 perforations are round, erect and tubular. The color pattern is flesh-colored, red to blood-red, variegated with a few zigzag green markings above, and outside of the row of holes there are numerous short flames extending toward the columella. The shell has about the form of Haliotis pulcherrima, but is flatter, without radiating folds or spiral striae, except for indistinct indications on the spire. A close inspection shows close fine radiating striae all over. The surface between the holes and the columella is strongly convex. The inner surface is silvery pinkish. The columellar plate is not wide, it is flat. The cavity of the spire is red inside."

== Distribution ==
This marine species is endemic to Australia and occurs off New South Wales and Queensland.
