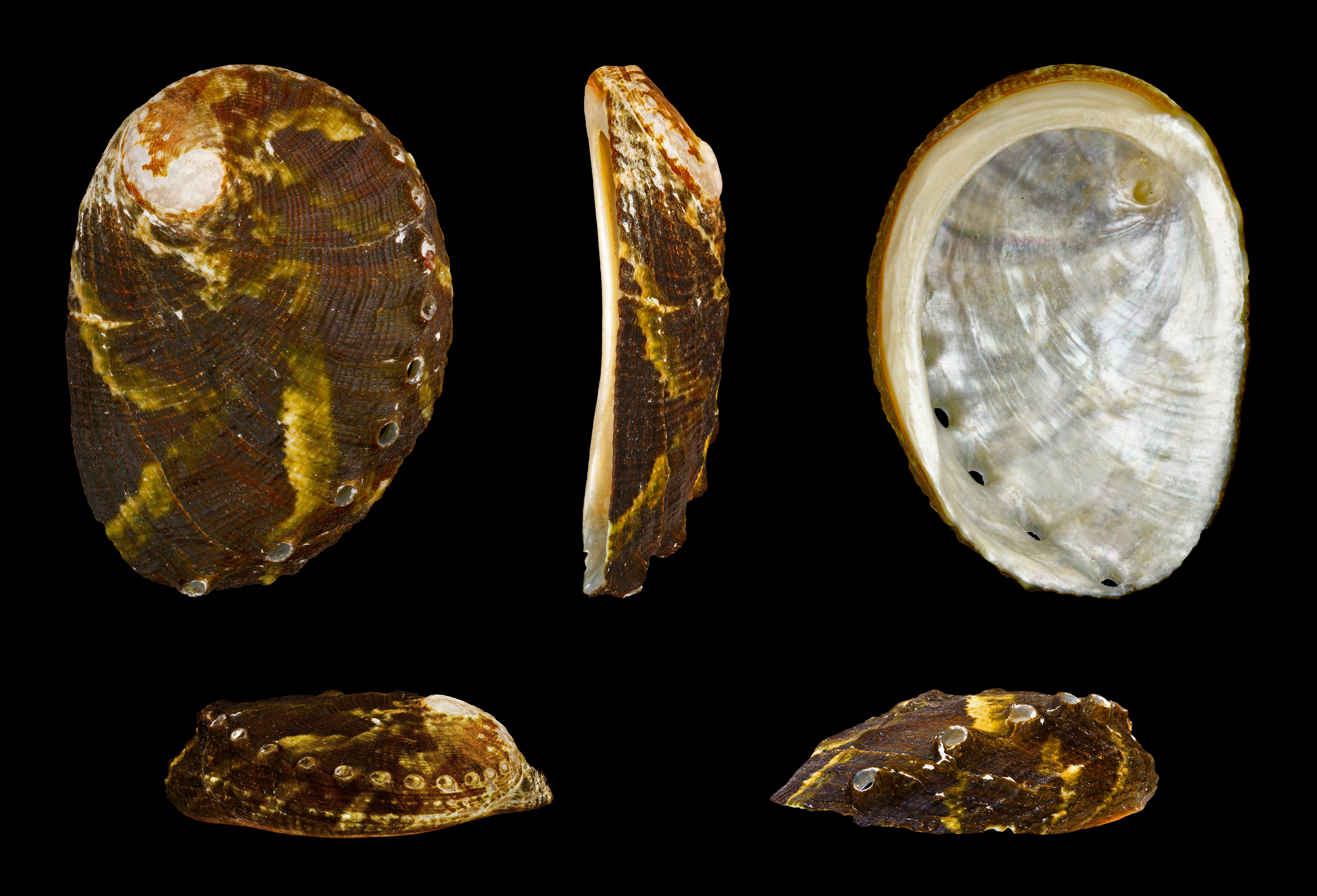
- Five views of a shell of Haliotis varia

Conservation status
- Least Concern (IUCN 3.1)

Scientific classification
- Kingdom: Animalia
- Phylum: Mollusca
- Class: Gastropoda
- Subclass: Vetigastropoda
- Order: Lepetellida
- Superfamily: Haliotoidea
- Family: Haliotidae
- Genus: Haliotis
- Species: H. varia

Binomial name
- Haliotis varia Linnaeus, 1758

Synonyms
- Haliotis astricta Reeve, 1846; Haliotis concinna Reeve, 1846; Haliotis dohrniana Dunker, 1863; Haliotis dringii Reeve, 1846; Haliotis gemma Reeve, 1846; Haliotis granulata Röding, 1798; Haliotis papulata Reeve, 1846; Haliotis pustulifera Pilsbry, 1890; Haliotis semistriata Reeve, 1846; Haliotis scutulum Reeve, 1846; Haliotis viridis Reeve, 1846; Sanhaliotis aliena Iredale, 1929

= Haliotis varia =

Species of gastropod

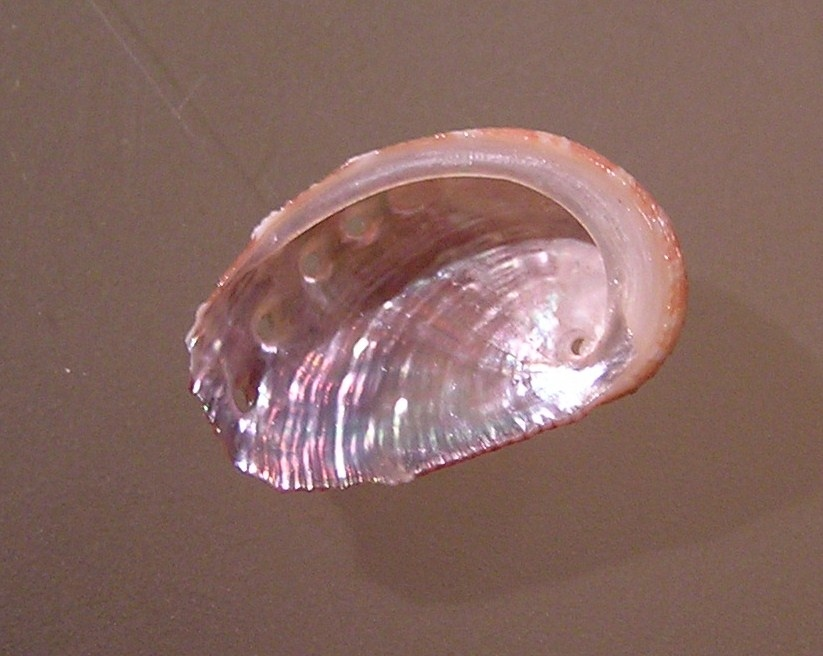
Shell of Haliotis varia

Haliotis varia, common name the variable abalone or the common ear shell, is a species of sea snail, a marine gastropod mollusk in the family Haliotidae, the abalones.

== Description ==
The size of the shell varies between 22 mm and 70 mm. It is shiny and the colour varies from something like mother of pearl to pink to red to gray to blue.

== Distribution ==
This marine species occurs in the Red Sea and in the Indo-West Pacific, off Tanzania, Mauritius and in the Mascarene Basin. It further occurs in the Western Pacific, from Sri Lanka to Tonga and off Australia (Northern Territory, Queensland and Western Australia)

Records from East Africa and India are questionable according to Geiger & Poppe, 2000
