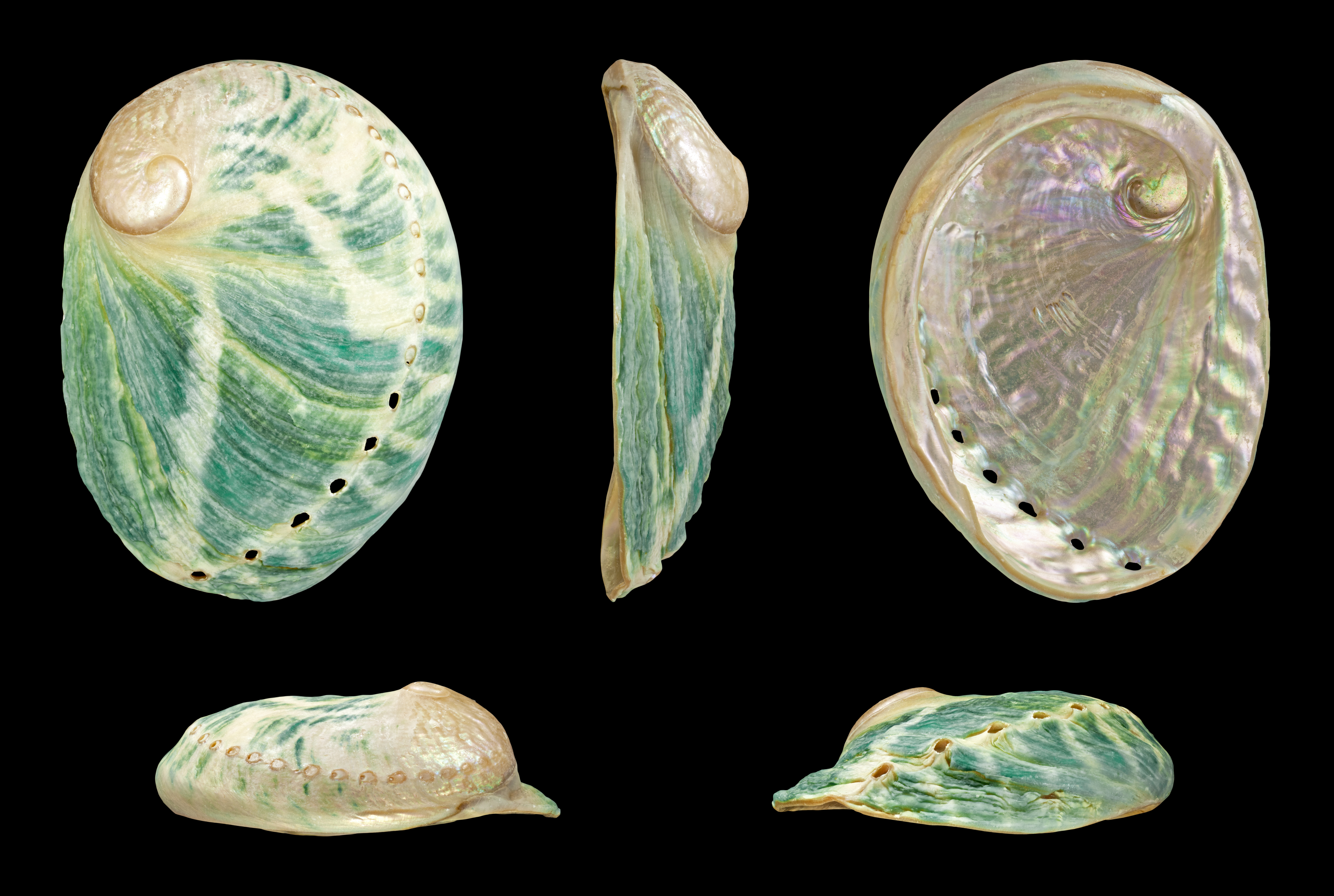
- Green form of Haliotis laevigata

Conservation status
- Vulnerable (IUCN 3.1)

Scientific classification
- Kingdom: Animalia
- Phylum: Mollusca
- Class: Gastropoda
- Subclass: Vetigastropoda
- Order: Lepetellida
- Family: Haliotidae
- Genus: Haliotis
- Species: H. laevigata

Binomial name
- Haliotis laevigata Donovan, 1808

Synonyms
- Haliotis albicans Quoy & Gaimard, 1834; Haliotis (Haliotis) excisa Gray, J.E., 1856; Haliotis glabra Swainson, 1822; Schismotis excisa Gray, 1856

= Haliotis laevigata =

Species of gastropod

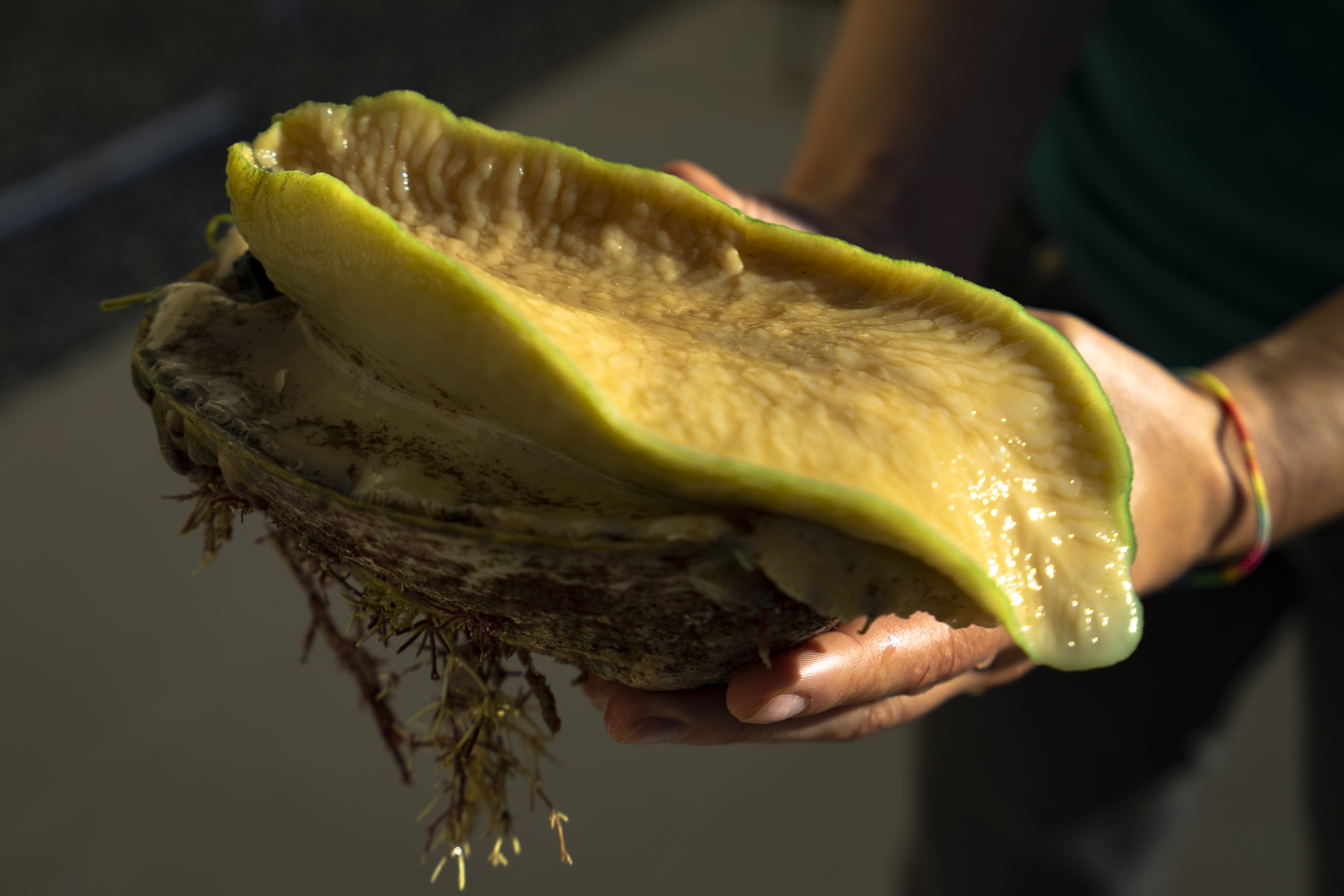
Ventral view of Haliotis laevigata

Haliotis laevigata, common name the smooth Australian abalone or greenlip abalone or whitened ear shell, is a species of sea snail, a marine gastropod mollusk in the family Haliotidae, the abalone.

== Description ==
The shell measures up to 18 cm (7 in); the species features a distinctive green ring around the foot at the bottom of the shell.

"The large, rather thin shell has an oval shape. The distance of the apex from the margin is one-sixth to one-eighth the length of the shell. The shell is nearly smooth but shows obsolete spiral lirae. The coloration is orange or orange-scarlet, radiately striped with continuous white flames. The coloration consists of continuous oblique stripes of scarlet and whitish. The about 12 perforations are very small. The outline of the shell is oval, with the right and left margins about equally curved. The back of the shell is convex, rounded, and not angulated at the row of perforations. The surface is sculptured with nearly obsolete spiral threads and cords. The spire is moderately elevated. The whorls number about 2½. The inner surface is silvery. The nacre is almost smooth, but shows traces of spiral sulci, and is very minutely wrinkled. The columellar plate is rather wide, sloping inward, flattened, and obliquely truncated at the base. The cavity of the spire is large and rather shallow. The perforations are unusually small, their borders not raised outside."

== Distribution ==
This marine species is endemic to Australia and occurs off South Australia, Victoria, Western Australia and Tasmania.

In Tasmania, the species is generally found on the northern coast, in particular the area of Rocky Cape, and also in the Furneaux Islands. Unless scuba diving at a reasonable depth of in excess of 30 ft (9 m), it is doubtful that legally sized greenlip abalone will be found. It is one of two abalone species harvested in large quantities in Australia, the other being the blacklip abalone. With decreasing stocks in the wild, the genome has been sequenced as a preliminary to possible aquaculture, this species having a large, highly-palatable muscular foot.
