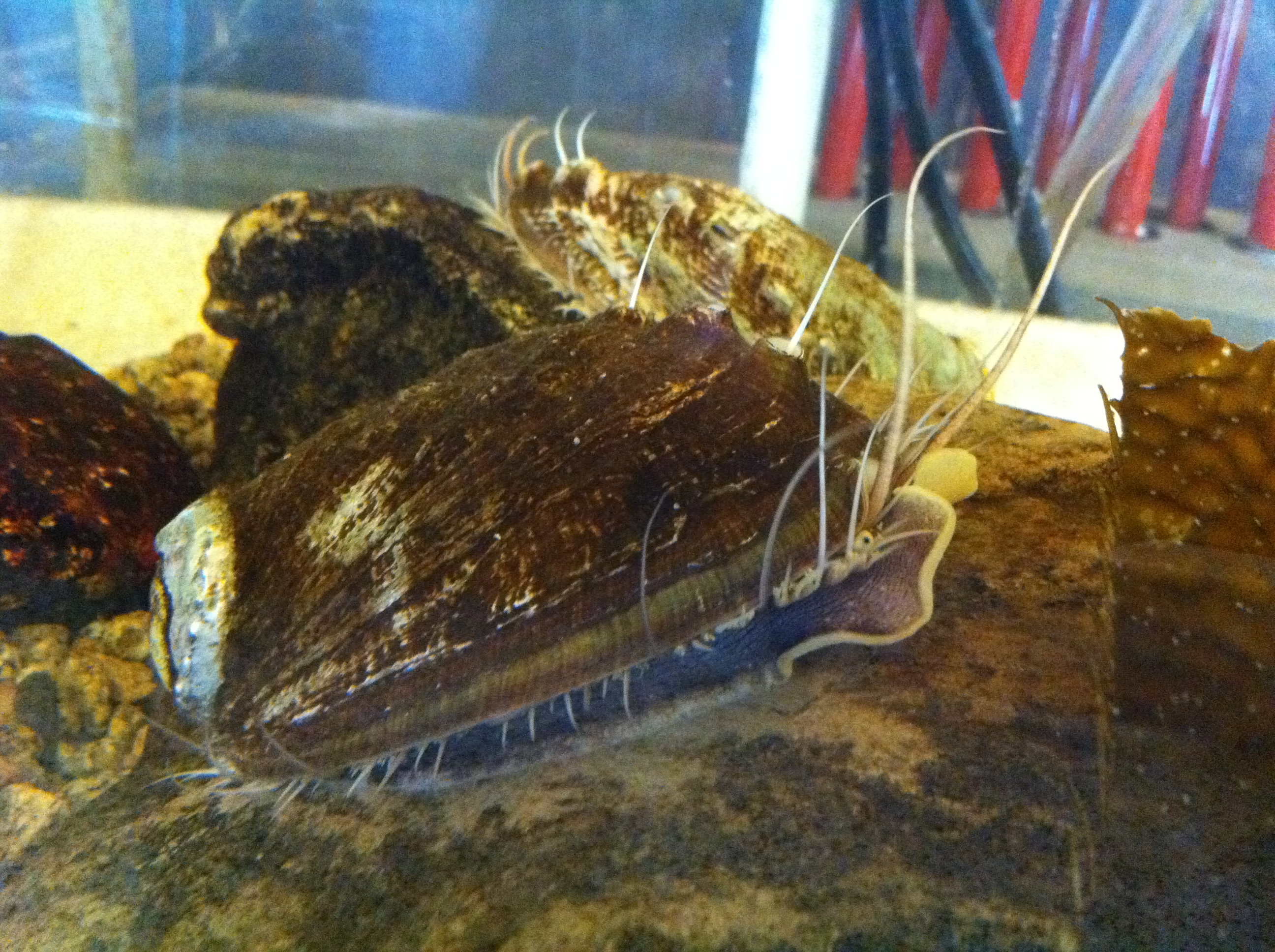
- Living abalone in tank showing epipodium and tentacles, anterior end to the right

Scientific classification
- Kingdom: Animalia
- Phylum: Mollusca
- Class: Gastropoda
- Subclass: Vetigastropoda
- Order: Lepetellida
- Superfamily: Haliotoidea
- Family: Haliotidae; Rafinesque, 1815
- Genus: Haliotis; Linnaeus, 1758

Type species
- Haliotis asinina Linnaeus, 1758

Synonyms
- Euhaliotis Wenz, 1938; Eurotis Habe & Kosuge, 1964; Exohaliotis Cotton & Godfrey, 1933; Haliotis (Haliotis) Linnaeus, 1758; Haliotis (Marinauris) Iredale, 1937; Haliotis (Nordotis) Habe & Kosuge, 1964; Haliotis (Notohaliotis) Cotton & Godfrey, 1933; Haliotis (Padollus) Montfort, 1810; Haliotis (Paua) C. Fleming, 1953; Haliotis (Sulculus) H. Adams & A. Adams, 1854; Marinauris Iredale, 1927; Neohaliotis Cotton & Godfrey, 1933; Nordotis Habe & Kosuge, 1964; Notohaliotis Cotton & Godfrey, 1933; Ovinotis Cotton, 1943; Padollus Montfort, 1810; Paua C. Fleming, 1953; Sanhaliotis Iredale, 1929; Schismotis Gray, 1856; Teinotis H. Adams & A. Adams, 1854; Tinotis P. Fischer, 1885 (invalid: unjustified emendation of Teinotis); Usahaliotis Habe & Kosuge, 1964

= Abalone =

Abalone Temporal range: Late Cretaceous – Recent

Common name for a group of sea snails

Abalone (mass noun; /ˈæbəloʊni/ or /ˌæbəˈloʊni/; via Spanish abulón, from Rumsen aulón) are sea snails in the genus Haliotis, the only genus in the family Haliotidae. Abalone shells are distinctive for their flattened, ear-like shape, nacreous interior, and row of holes used for respiration. The flesh of abalone is widely considered to be a delicacy, and is consumed raw or cooked in a variety of cuisines. Abalone are globally distributed, with approximately 70 known species alive today. Though some species are small, the largest abalone can attain a length of 12 inches (300 mm).

== Names ==
Other common names for abalone are ear shells, sea ears, and, now rarely, muttonfish or muttonshells in parts of Australia, ormer in the United Kingdom, perlemoen in South Africa, and pāua in New Zealand.

== Description ==
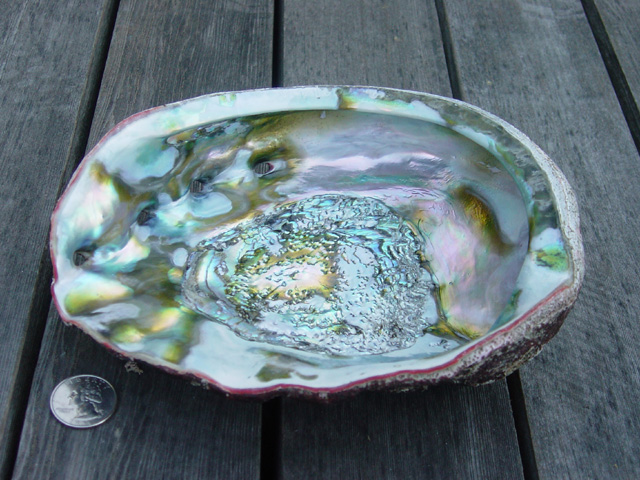
The iridescent surface inside a red abalone shell from Northern California. The US coin (quarter) is 24.3 mm or 0.955 in in diameter

Most abalone vary in size from 20 mm (0.8 in) (Haliotis pulcherrima) to 200 mm (8 in). The largest species, Haliotis rufescens, reaches 300 mm (12 in).

The shells of abalone have a low, open spiral structure, and are characterized by several open respiratory pores in a row near the shell's outer edge. The thick inner layer of the shell is composed of nacre, which in many species is highly iridescent, giving rise to a range of strong, changeable colors which make the shells attractive to humans as ornaments, jewelry, and as a source of colorful mother-of-pearl.

The shell of abalone is convex, rounded to oval in shape, and may be highly arched or very flattened. The shell of the majority of species has a small, flat spire and two to three whorls. The last whorl, known as the body whorl, is auriform, meaning that the shell resembles an ear, giving rise to the common name "ear shell". Haliotis asinina has a somewhat different shape, as it is more elongated and distended. The shell of Haliotis cracherodii cracherodii is also unusual as it has an ovate form, is imperforate, shows an exserted spire, and has prickly ribs.

A mantle cleft in the shell impresses a groove in the shell, in which are the row of holes characteristic of the genus. These holes are respiratory apertures for venting water from the gills and for releasing sperm and eggs into the water column. They make up what is known as the selenizone, which forms as the shell grows. This series of eight to 38 holes is near the anterior margin. Only a small number is generally open. The older holes are gradually sealed up as the shell grows and new holes form. Each species has a typical number of open holes, between four and 10, in the selenizone. An abalone has no operculum. The aperture of the shell is very wide and nacreous.

The exterior of the shell is striated and dull. The color of the shell is very variable from species to species, which may reflect the animal's diet. The iridescent nacre that lines the inside of the shell varies in color from silvery white, to pink, red and green-red to deep blue, green to purple.

The animal has fimbriated head lobes and side lobes that are fimbriated and cirrated. The radula has small median teeth, and the lateral teeth are single and beam-like. They have about 70 uncini, with denticulated hooks, the first four very large. The rounded foot is very large in comparison to most molluscs. The soft body is coiled around the columellar muscle, and its insertion, instead of being on the columella, is on the middle of the inner wall of the shell. The gills are symmetrical and both well developed.

These snails cling solidly with their broad, muscular foot to rocky surfaces at sublittoral depths, although some species such as Haliotis cracherodii used to be common in the intertidal zone. Abalone reach maturity at a relatively small size. Their fecundity is high and increases with their size, laying from 10,000 to 11 million eggs at a time. The spermatozoa are filiform and pointed at one end, and the anterior end is a rounded head.

The larvae are lecithotrophic. The adults are herbivorous and feed with their rhipidoglossan radula on macroalgae, preferring red or brown algae. Sizes vary from 20 mm (25/32 in) (Haliotis pulcherrima) to 200 mm (7 7/8 in), while Haliotis rufescens is the largest of the genus at 30 cm (12 in).

== Distribution ==
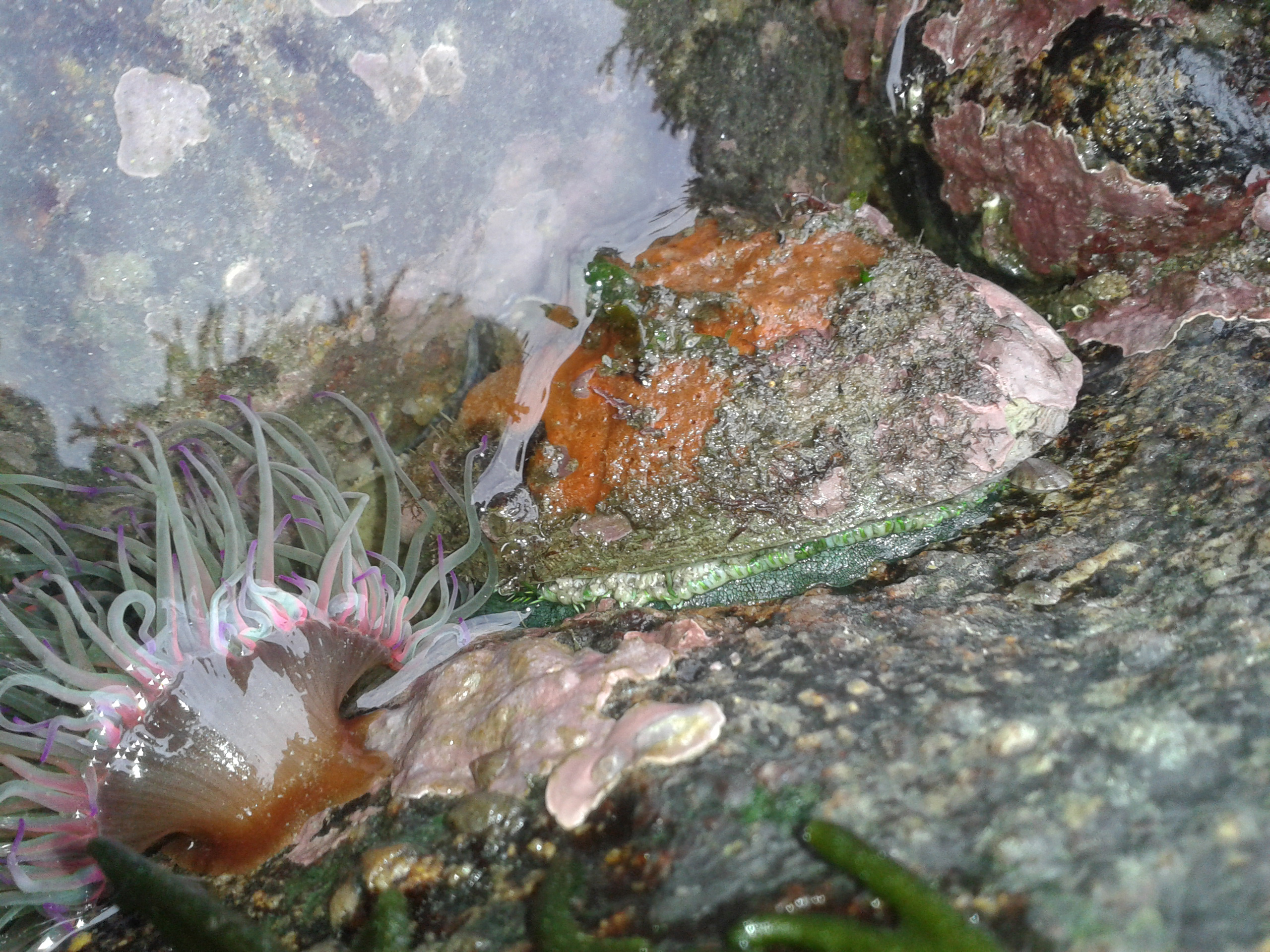
Abalone with a live sponge on its shell in Póvoa de Varzim, Portugal

The haliotid family has a worldwide distribution, along the coastal waters of every continent, except the Pacific coast of South America, the Atlantic coast of North America, the Arctic, and Antarctica. The majority of abalone species are found in cold waters, such as off the coasts of New Zealand, South Africa, Australia, Western North America, and Japan.

== Evolutionary history ==
Abalone are members of the clade Vetigastropoda, though their precise position within the clade is uncertain. Despite their inclusion in the order Lepetellida, they do not appear to be particularly closely related to other members of the order and may be more closely related to Trochoidea, or alternatively outside of a clade uniting Trochoidea with the rest of Lepetellida. The earliest known fossil abalone are known from the Campanian age of the Late Cretaceous. The few known Cretaceous abalone fossils have all been found in North America, suggesting that the group may have originated there, although other possibilities have been suggested, including a central Indo-Pacific origin based on where abalone are most diverse today. Haliotidae may have evolved from the pleurotomariidan families Temnotropidae or Trochotomidae. Trochotoma frydai, (Note: Trochotoma frydai was originally described as a species of Temnotropis, but reassigned to Trochotoma by Karapunar and Nützel in 2021.) from the Campanian of Spain, closely resembles the Cretaceous abalone Haliotis antillesensis except in having a slit instead of a row of tremata.

== Structure and properties of the shell ==
The shell of the abalone is exceptionally strong and is composed of a tightly packed calcium carbonate matrix. Layered among the matrix is an endogenous protein further strengthening the shell. Due to the unique structure of the shell, a force applied directly to the shell matrix will more likely cause the shedding of layers as opposed to cracking or shattering. Material scientists are currently studying this structure for insight into stronger ablative protective tools such as body armor.

The dust created by grinding and cutting abalone shell is dangerous; appropriate safeguards must be taken to protect people from inhaling these particles.

== Diseases and pests ==
Abalone are subject to various infectious diseases. The Victorian Department of Primary Industries said in 2007 that ganglioneuritis killed up to 90% of stock in affected regions. Abalone possess very little clotting factor, meaning even a mild to moderate skin-piercing injury can result in death from fluid loss. Members of the Spionidae of the polychaetes are known as pests of abalone.

== Human use ==
Abalone have been harvested for seafood and aesthetics since prehistory. Abalone shells and associated materials, like their claw-like pearls and nacre, have been used as jewelry and for buttons, buckles and inlay. These shells have been found in archaeological sites around the world, ranging from 100,000-year-old deposits at Blombos Cave in South Africa to historic Chinese abalone middens on California's Northern Channel Islands. For at least 12,000 years, abalone were harvested to such an extent around the Channel Islands that shells in the area decreased in size four thousand years ago.

=== Farming ===
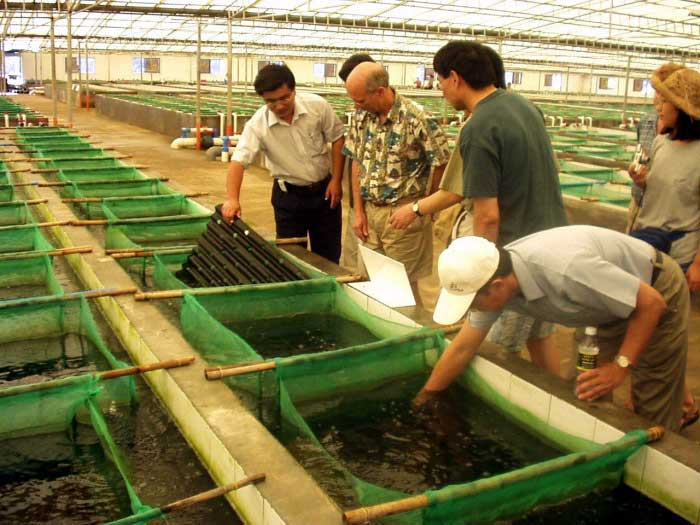
An abalone farm

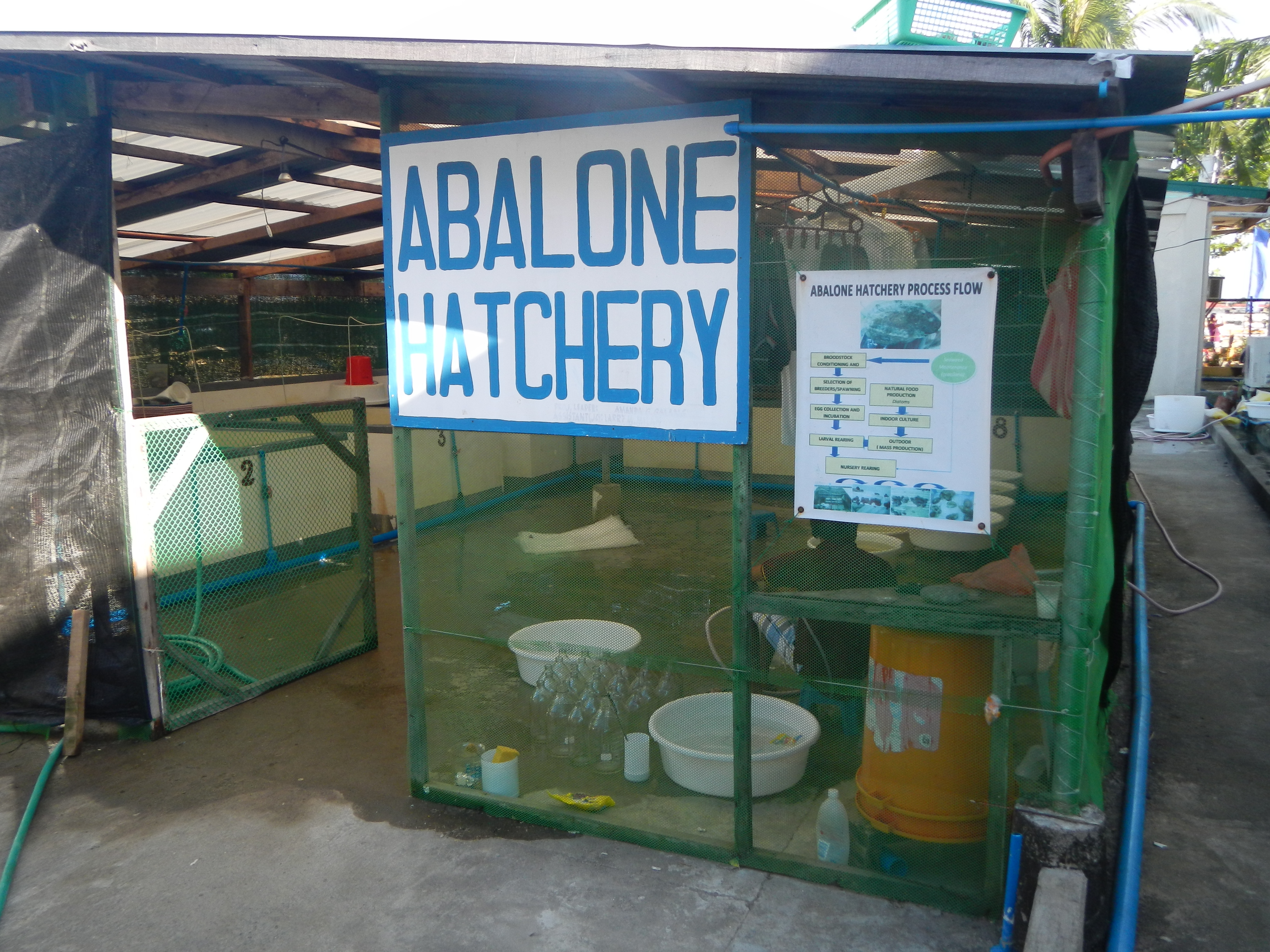
Abalone hatchery

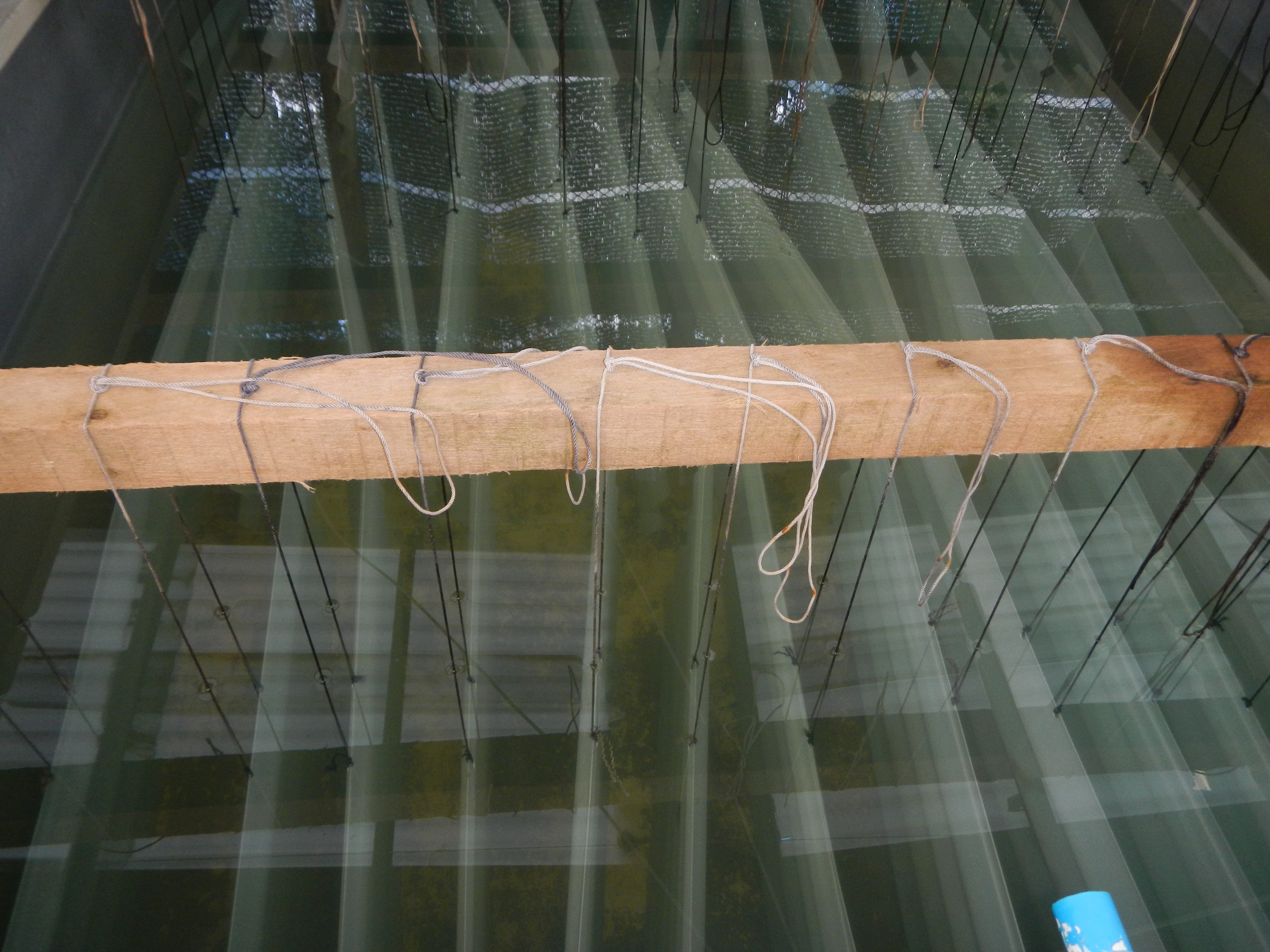
Part of the Multi-Species Fish and Invertebrate Breeding and Hatchery, (Oceanographic Marine Laboratory, Lucap, Alaminos, Pangasinan, Philippines, 2011)

Aquafarming of abalone as a meat product began in the late 1950s and early 1960s in Japan and China. Since the mid-1990s, there have been many increasingly successful endeavors to commercially farm abalone for the purpose of consumption. Overfishing and poaching have reduced wild populations to such an extent that farmed abalone now supplies most of the abalone meat consumed. The principal abalone farming regions are Mainland China, Taiwan, Japan and South Korea. Abalone is also farmed in Australia, Canada, Chile, France, Iceland, Ireland, Mexico, Namibia, New Zealand, South Africa, Spain, Thailand and the United States.

After trials in 2012, a commercial "sea ranch" was set up in Flinders Bay, Western Australia, to raise abalone. The ranch is based on an artificial reef made up of 5,000 separate concrete abalone habitat units, which can host 400 abalone each. The reef is seeded with young abalone from an onshore hatchery.

The abalone feed on seaweed that grows naturally on the habitats; the ecosystem enrichment of the bay also results in growing numbers of dhufish, pink snapper, wrasse, and Samson fish among other species.

=== Consumption ===
Abalone have long been a valuable food source for humans in every area of the world where a species is abundant. The meat of this mollusc is considered a delicacy in certain parts of Latin America (particularly Chile), France, New Zealand, East Asia and Southeast Asia.

In the Greater China region and among overseas Chinese communities, abalone is commonly known as bao yu, and sometimes forms part of a Chinese banquet as one of the four sea delicacies of Chinese cuisine. In the same way as shark fin soup or bird's nest soup, abalone is considered a luxury item, and is traditionally reserved for celebrations.

In Japan, live and raw abalone are used in sushi (known as awabi) or served steamed, salted, boiled, chopped, or simmered in soy sauce. Salted, fermented abalone entrails are the main component of tottsuru, a local dish from Honshū. Tottsuru is mainly eaten with sake.

In South Korea, abalone is called Jeonbok and used in various recipes. Jeonbok porridge and pan-fried abalone steak with butter are popular, but it's also commonly used in soups or ramyeon.

In California, US, abalone meat can be found on pizza, sautéed with caramelized mango, or in steak form dusted with cracker meal and flour. As abalone became more popular and less common, the prices adjusted accordingly. In the 1920s, a restaurant-served portion of abalone, about 4 ounces (110 g), would cost (in inflation adjusted dollars) about US$7; by 2004, the price had risen to US$75. In the United States, prior to this time, abalone was predominantly eaten, gathered, and prepared by Chinese immigrants. Before that, abalone were collected to be eaten, and used for other purposes by Native American tribes. By 1900, laws were passed in California to outlaw the taking of abalone in the intertidal zone. This forced the Chinese out of the market and the Japanese perfected diving, with or without gear, to enter the market. Abalone started to become popular in the US after the Panama–Pacific International Exposition in 1915, which exhibited 365 varieties of fish with cooking demonstrations, and a 1,300-seat dining hall.

=== Sport harvesting ===
==== Australia ====
Tasmania supplies about 25% of the yearly world abalone harvest. Around 12,500 Tasmanians recreationally fish for blacklip and greenlip abalone. For blacklip abalone, the size limit varies between 138 mm (5.4 in) for the southern end of the state and 127 mm (5.0 in) for the northern end of the state. Greenlip abalone have a minimum size of 145 mm (5.7 in), except for an area around Perkins Bay in the north of the state where the minimum size is 132 millimetres (5.2 in). With a recreational abalone licence, the bag limit is 10 per day, with a total possession limit of 20. Scuba diving for abalone is allowed, and has a rich history in Australia. (Scuba diving for abalone in the states of New South Wales and Western Australia is illegal; a free-diving catch limit of two is allowed).

Victoria has had an active abalone fishery since the late 1950s. The state is sectioned into three fishing zones, Eastern, Central and Western, with each fisher required a zone-allocated licence. Harvesting is performed by divers using surface-supplied air "hookah" systems operating from runabout-style, outboard-powered boats. While the diver seeks out colonies of abalone amongst the reef beds, the deckhand operates the boat, known as working "live" and stays above where the diver is working. Bags of abalone pried from the rocks are brought to the surface by the diver or by way of "shot line", where the deckhand drops a weighted rope for the catch bag to be connected then retrieved. Divers measure each abalone before removing from the reef and the deckhand remeasures each abalone and removes excess weed growth from the shell. Since 2002, the Victorian industry has seen a significant decline in catches, with the total allowable catch reduced from 1440 to 787 tonnes for the 2011/12 fishing year, due to dwindling stocks and most notably the abalone virus ganglioneuritis, which is fast-spreading and lethal to abalone stocks.

==== United States ====
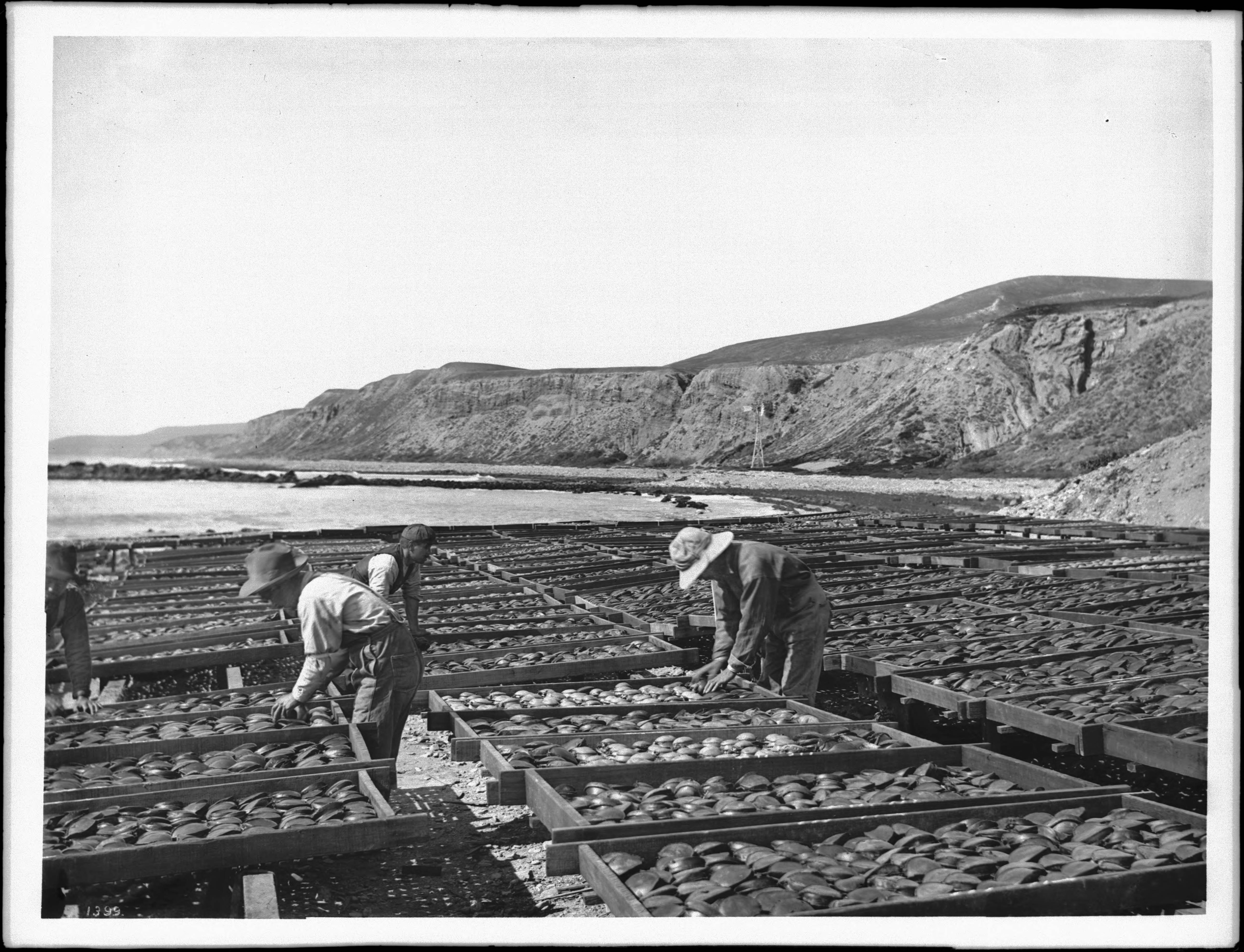
Workers drying abalone shells in the sun in southern California, circa 1900

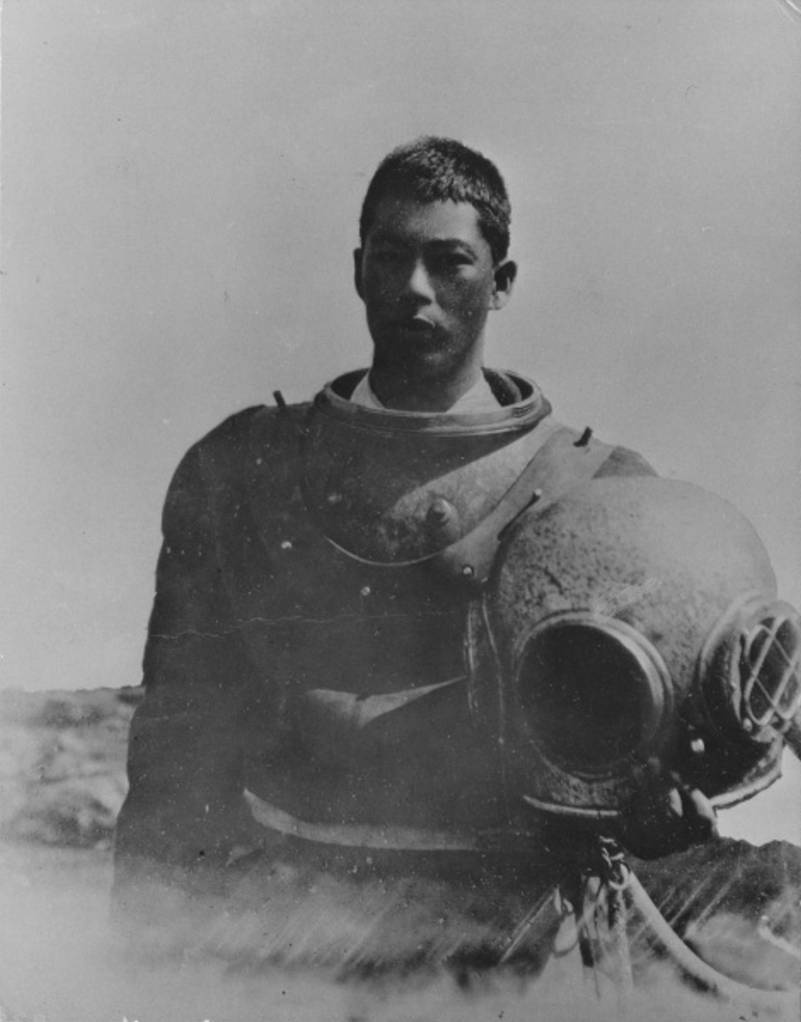
A young Japanese abalone diver in California in 1905

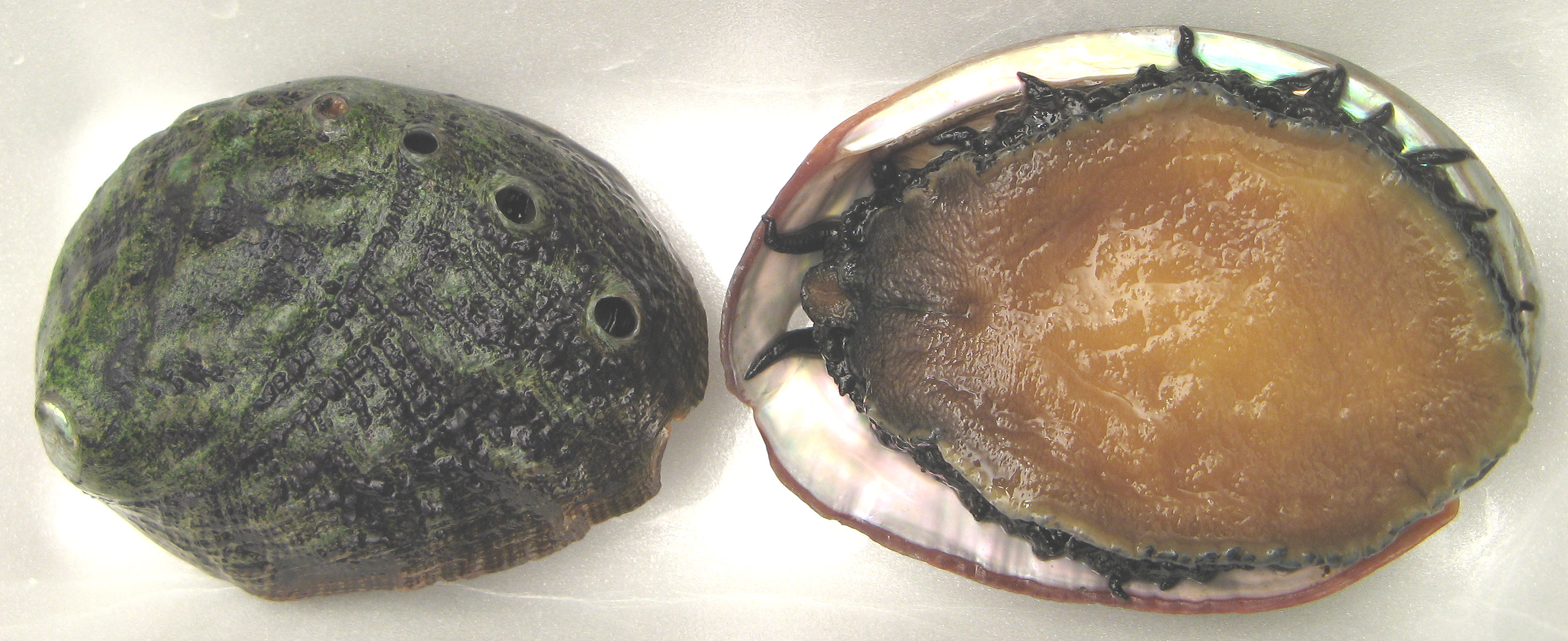
Two highly endangered white abalone: Prohibitions on commercial and recreational harvest of this species have been in place since 1996.

Sport harvesting of red abalone is permitted with a California fishing license and an abalone stamp card. In 2008, the abalone card also came with a set of 24 tags. This was reduced to 18 abalone per year in 2014, and as of 2017 the limit has been reduced to 12, only nine of which may be taken south of Mendocino County. Legal-size abalone must be tagged immediately. Abalone may only be taken using breath-hold techniques or shorepicking; scuba diving for abalone is strictly prohibited. Taking of abalone is not permitted south of the mouth of San Francisco Bay. A size minimum of 7 in (180 mm) measured across the shell is in place. A person may be in possession of only three abalone at any given time.

As of 2017, abalone season is May to October, excluding July. Transportation of abalone may only legally occur while the abalone is still attached in the shell. Sale of sport-obtained abalone is illegal, including the shell. Only red abalone may be taken, as black, white, pink, flat, green, and pinto abalone are protected by law. In 2018, the California Fish and Game Commission closed recreational abalone season due to dramatically declining populations. That year, they extended the moratorium to last through April 2021. Afterwards, they extended the ban for another 5 years until April 2026.

In December 2025 California extended the ban another 10 years until April 2036.

An abalone diver is normally equipped with a thick wetsuit, including a hood, bootees, and gloves, and usually also a mask, snorkel, weight belt, abalone iron, and abalone gauge. Alternatively, the rock picker can feel underneath rocks at low tides for abalone. Abalone are mostly taken in depths from a few inches up to 10 m (33 ft); less common are freedivers who can work deeper than 10 m (33 ft). Abalone are normally found on rocks near food sources such as kelp. An abalone iron is used to pry the abalone from the rock before it has time to fully clamp down. Divers dive from boats, kayaks, tube floats, or directly off the shore.

The largest abalone recorded in California is 12.34 in (31.3 cm), caught by John Pepper somewhere off the coast of San Mateo County in September 1993.

The mollusc Concholepas concholepas is often sold in the United States under the name "Chilean abalone", though it is not an abalone, but a muricid.

==== New Zealand ====
In New Zealand, abalone is called pāua (/ˈpaʊə/, from the Māori language). Haliotis iris (or blackfoot pāua) is the ubiquitous New Zealand pāua, the highly polished nacre of which is extremely popular as souvenirs with its striking blue, green, and purple iridescence. Haliotis australis and Haliotis virginea are also found in New Zealand waters, but are less popular than H. iris. Haliotis pirimoana is a small species endemic to Manawatāwhi / the Three Kings Islands that superficially resembles H. virginea.

Like all New Zealand shellfish, recreational harvesting of pāua does not require a permit provided catch limits, size restrictions, and seasonal and local restrictions set by the Ministry for Primary Industries (MPI) are followed. The legal recreational daily limit is 10 per diver, with a minimum shell length of 125 mm (4.9 in) for H. iris and 80 mm (3.1 in) for H. australis. In addition, no person may be in possession, even on land, of more than 20 pāua or more than 2.5 kg (5.5 lb) of pāua meat at any one time. Pāua can only be caught by free-diving; it is illegal to catch them using scuba gear.

An extensive global black market exists in collecting and exporting abalone meat. This can be a particularly awkward problem where the right to harvest pāua can be granted legally under Māori customary rights. When such permits to harvest are abused, it is frequently difficult to police. The limit is strictly enforced by roving Ministry for Primary Industries fishery officers with the backing of the New Zealand Police. Poaching is a major industry in New Zealand with many thousands being taken illegally, often undersized. Convictions have resulted in seizure of diving gear, boats, and motor vehicles and fines and in rare cases, imprisonment.

==== South Africa ====
There are five species endemic to South Africa, namely H. parva, H. spadicea, H. queketti and H. speciosa.

The largest abalone in South Africa, Haliotis midae, occurs along roughly two-thirds of the country's coastline. Abalone-diving has been a recreational activity for many years, but stocks are currently being threatened by illegal commercial harvesting. In South Africa, all persons harvesting this shellfish need permits that are issued annually, and no abalone may be harvested using scuba gear.

For the last few years, however, no permits have been issued for collecting abalone, but commercial harvesting still continues as does illegal collection by syndicates. In 2007, because of widespread poaching of abalone, the South African government listed abalone as an endangered species according to the CITES section III appendix, which requests member governments to monitor the trade in this species. This listing was removed from CITES in June 2010 by the South African government and South African abalone is no longer subject to CITES trade controls. Export permits are still required, however. The abalone meat from South Africa is prohibited for sale in the country to help reduce poaching; however, much of the illegally harvested meat is sold in Asian countries. As of early 2008, the wholesale price for abalone meat was approximately US$40.00 per kilogram. There is an active trade in the shells, which sell for more than US$1,400 per tonne.

==== Channel Islands, Brittany and Normandy ====
Ormers (Haliotis tuberculata) are considered a delicacy in the British Channel Islands as well as in adjacent areas of France, and are pursued with great alacrity by the locals. This, and a recent lethal bacterial disease, has led to a dramatic depletion in numbers since the latter half of the 19th century, and "ormering" is now strictly regulated to preserve stocks. The gathering of ormers is now restricted to a number of 'ormering tides', from 1 January to 30 April, which occur on the full or new moon and two days following. No ormers may be taken from the beach that are under 80 millimetres (3.1 in) in shell length. Gatherers are not allowed to wear wetsuits or even put their heads underwater. Any breach of these laws is a criminal offence and can lead to a fine of up to £5,000 or six months in prison. The demand for ormers is such that they led to the world's first underwater arrest, when Mr. Kempthorne-Leigh of Guernsey was arrested by a police officer in full diving gear when illegally diving for ormers.

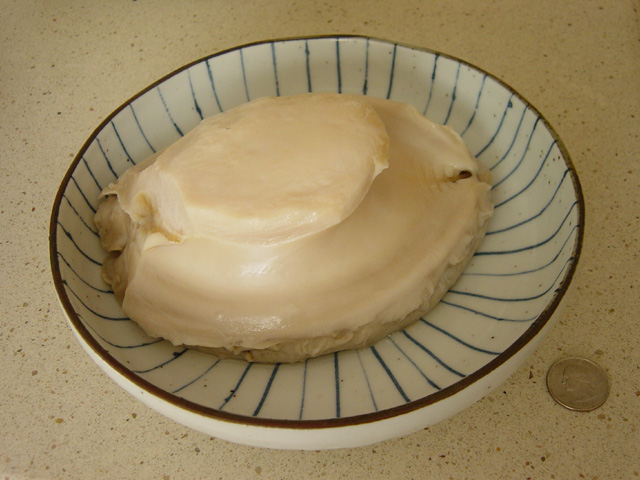
The raw meat of abalone

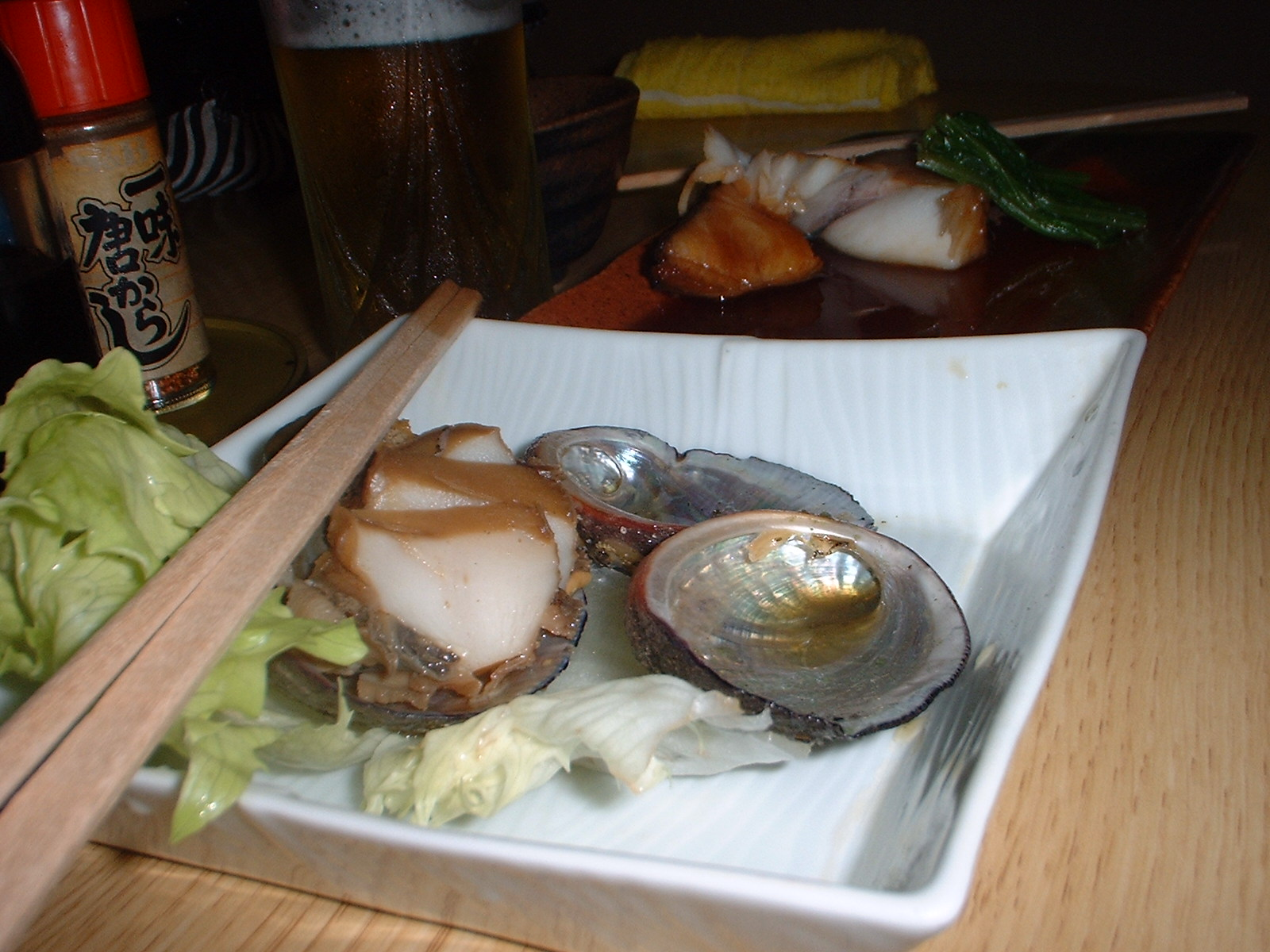
Abalone sashimi

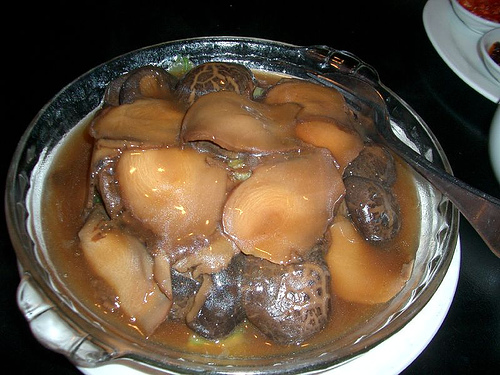
Braised abalone

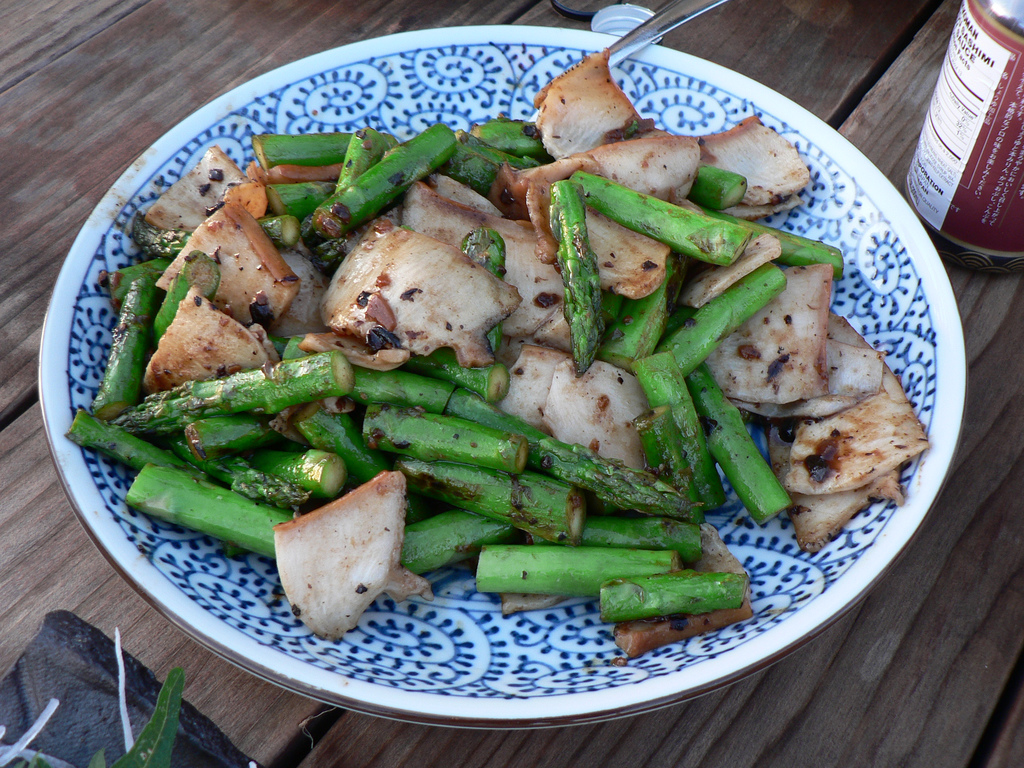
Abalone with asparagus

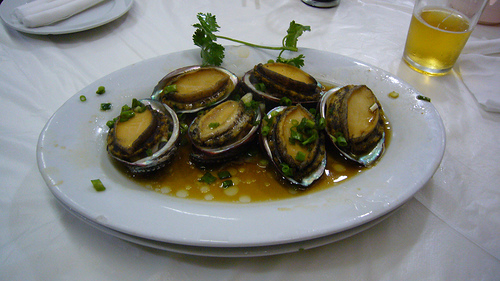
Abalone bao yu

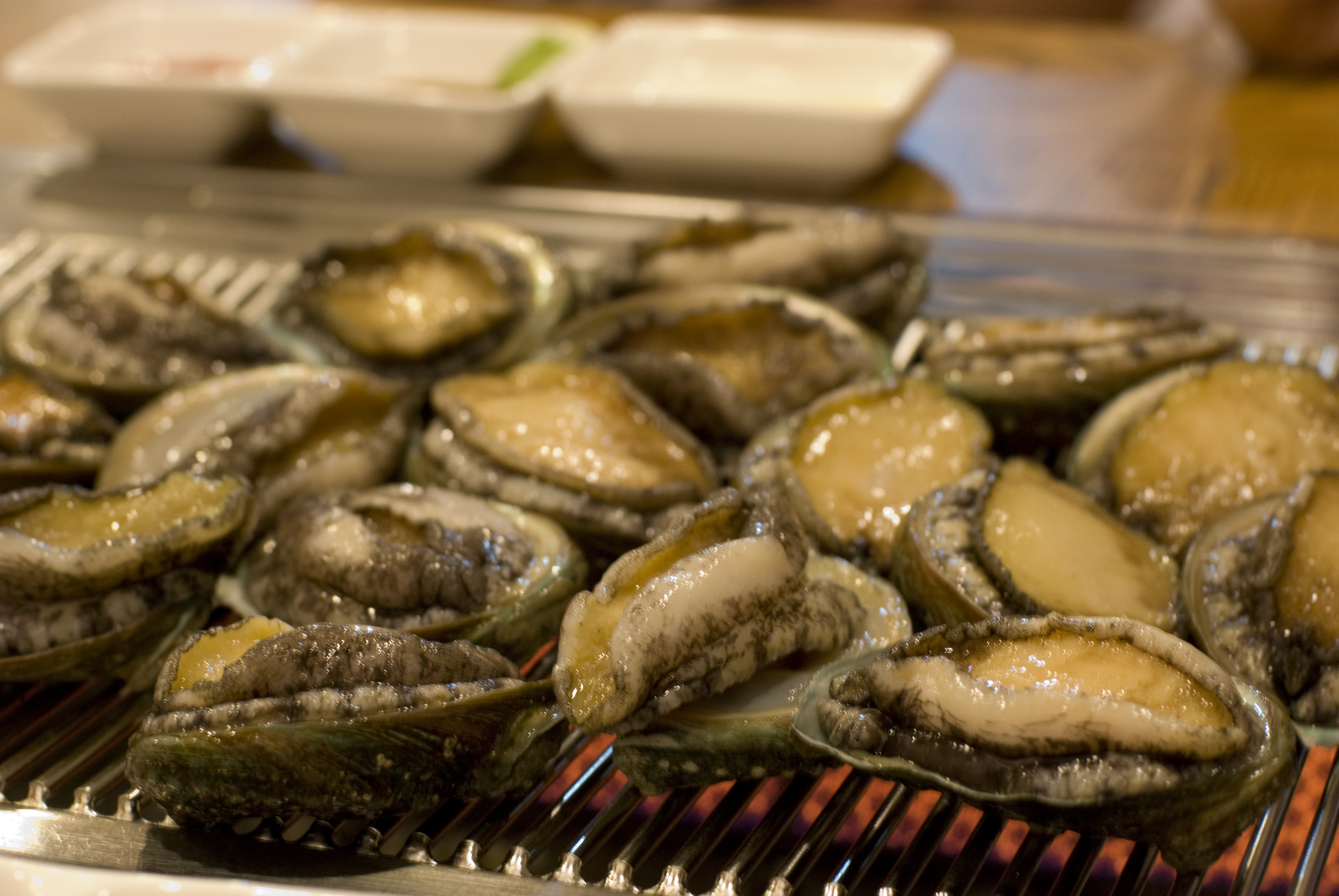
Grilled abalone

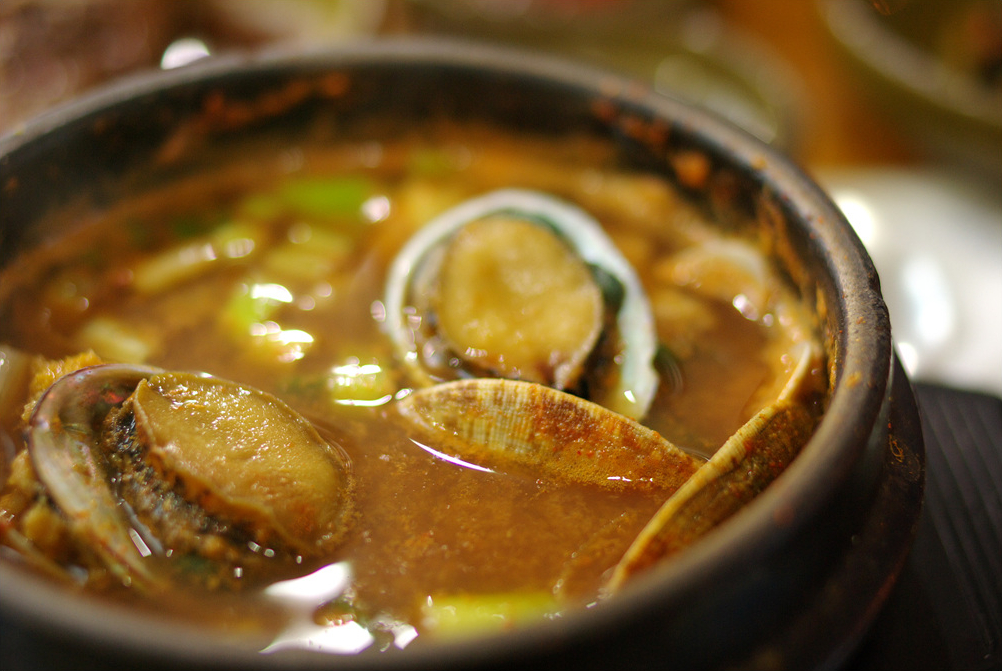
A Korean abalone stew

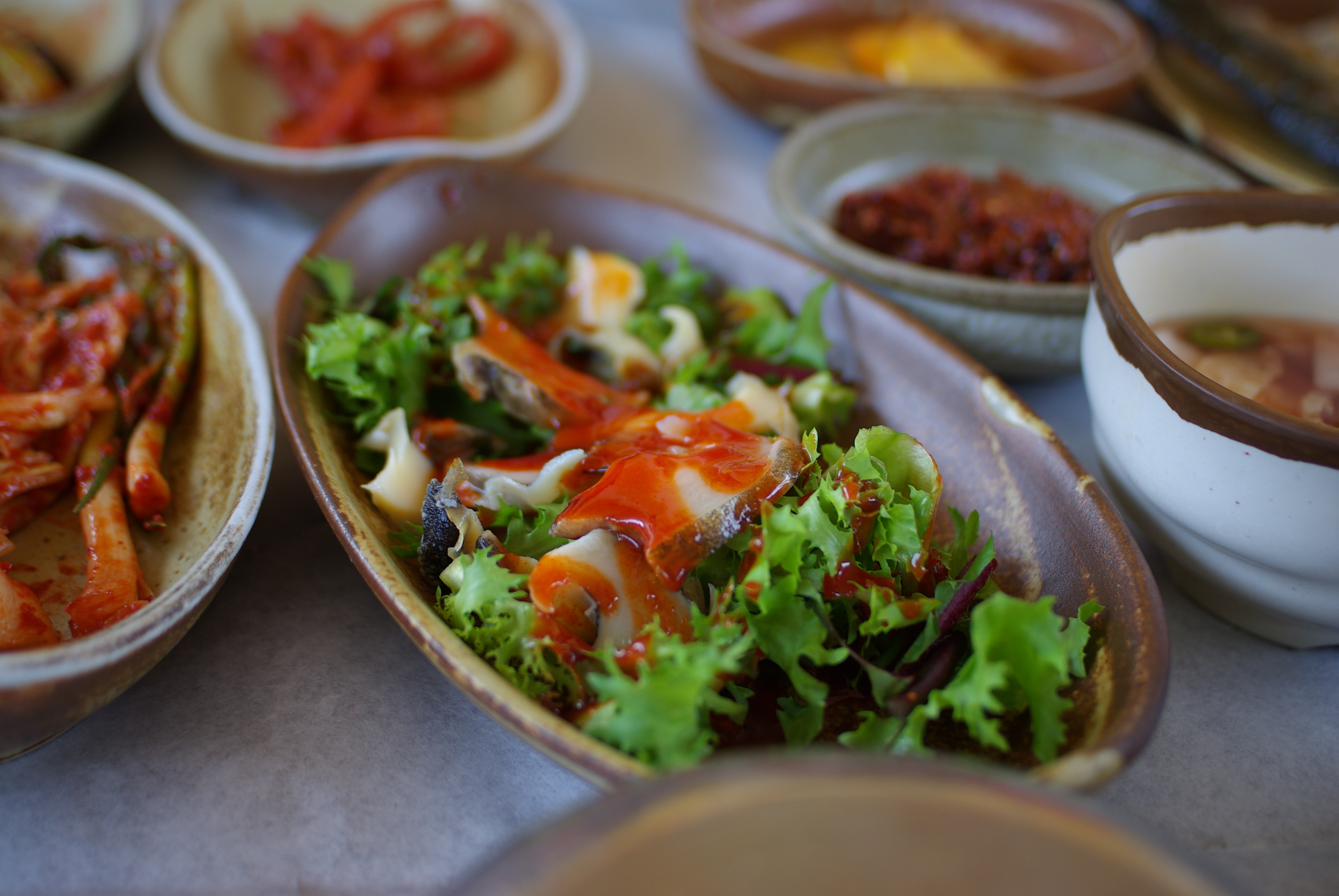
Abalone Hoe

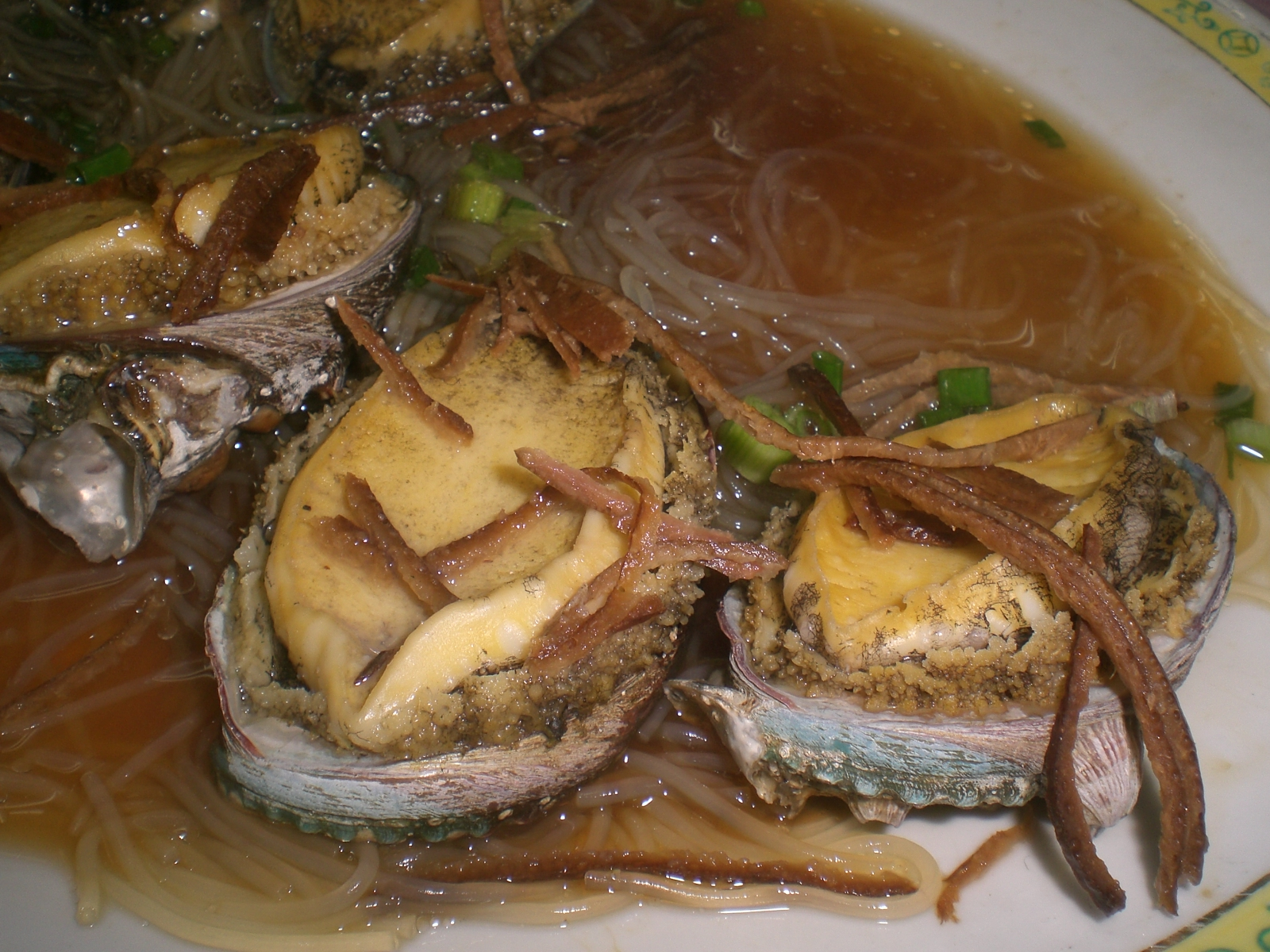
Abalone with mandarin orange peels

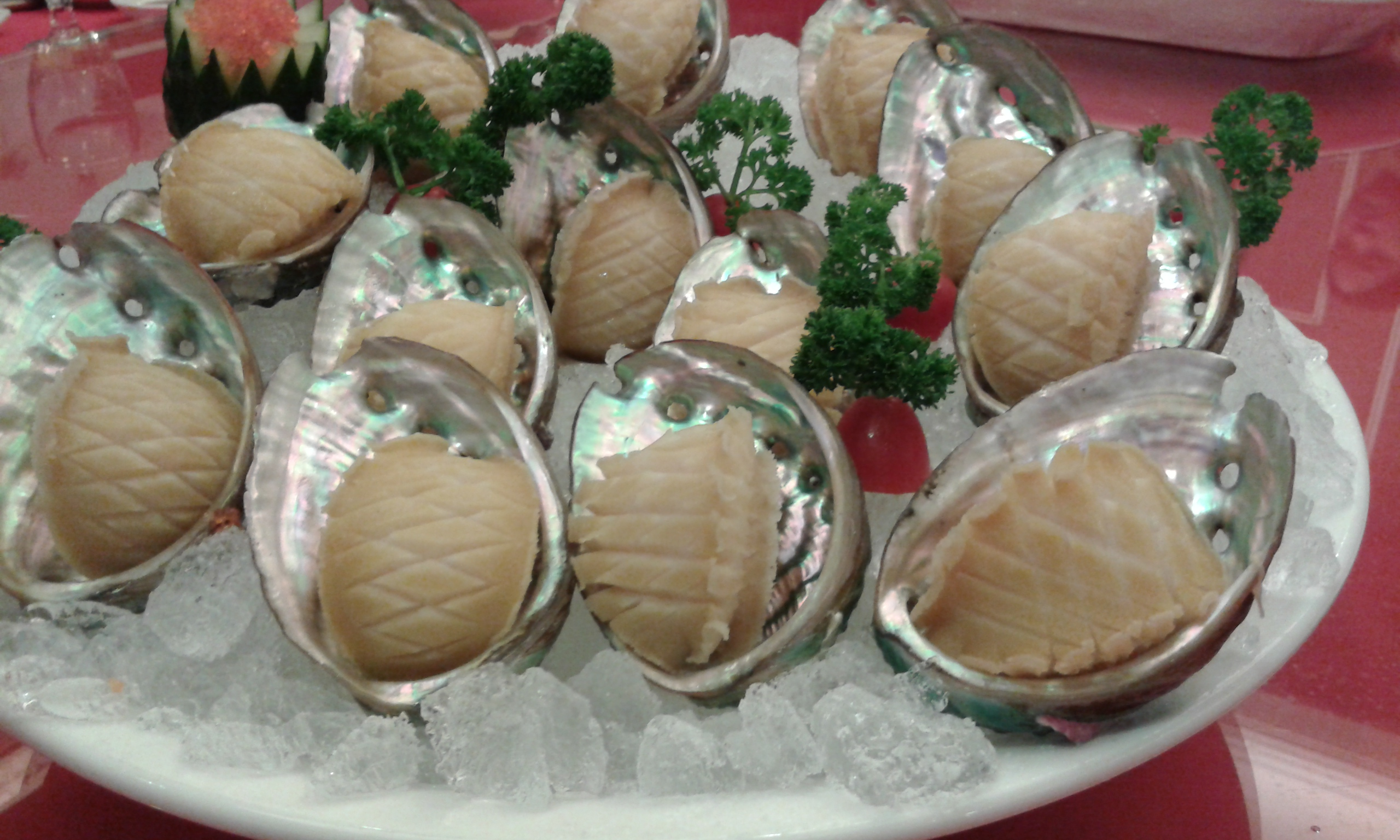
Abalone (dish) - in Macau

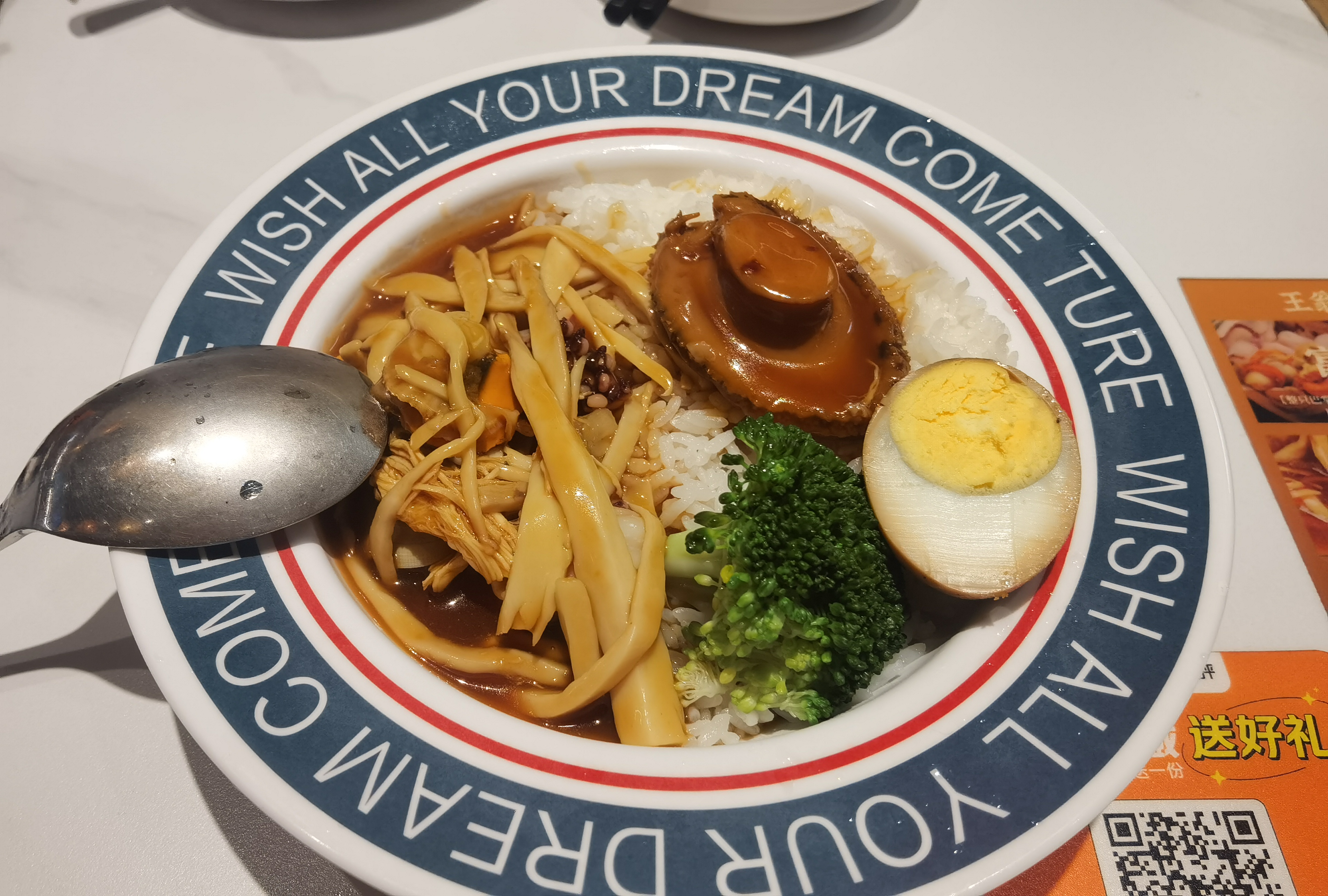
Abalone Served with Rice

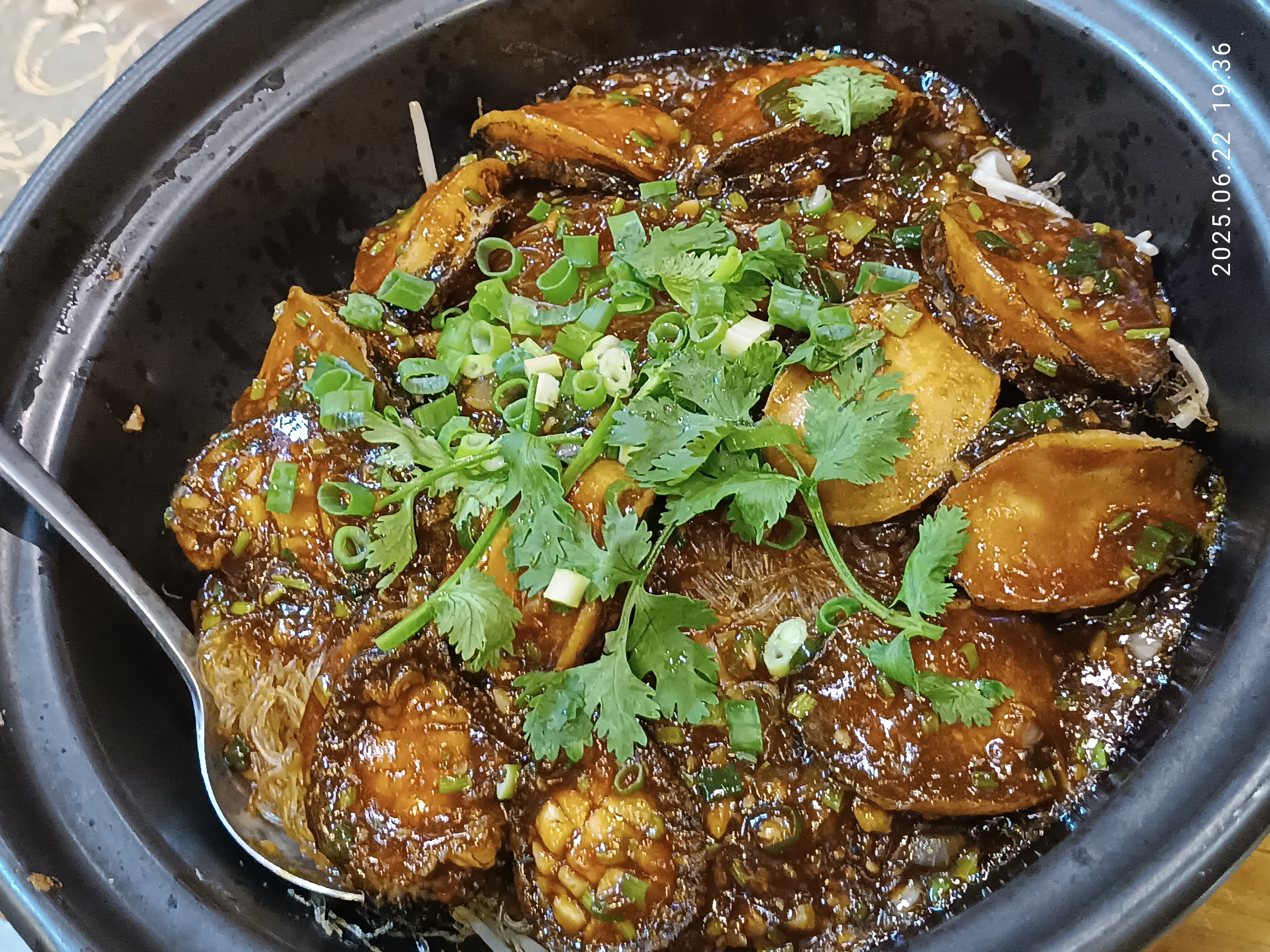
Steamed abalone with vermicelli

=== Decorative items ===
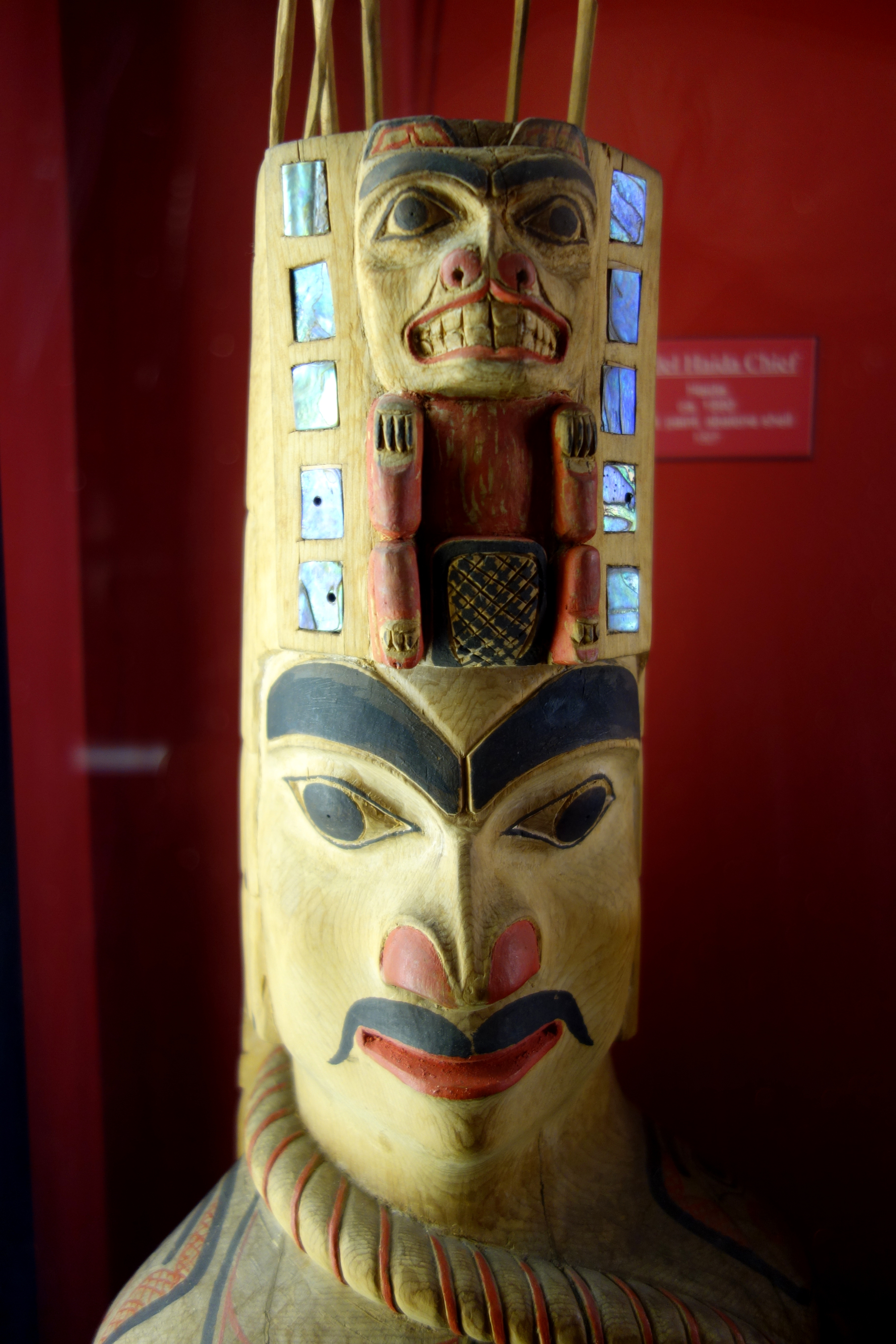
Haida carving with rectangular abalone shell accents

The highly iridescent inner nacre layer of the shell of abalone has traditionally been used as a decorative item, in jewelry, buttons, and as inlay in furniture and musical instruments, such as on fret boards and binding of guitars. See article Najeonchilgi regarding Korean handicraft.

=== Indigenous use ===
Abalone has been an important staple in a number of Indigenous cultures around the world, specifically in Africa and on the Northwest American coast. The meat is a traditional food, and the shell is used to make ornaments; historically, the shells were also used as currency in some communities.

== Threat of extinction ==
Abalone are critically threatened due to overfishing and the acidification of oceans as lower pH erodes the calcium carbonate in their shells. In the 21st century, white, pink, and green abalone are on the United States federal endangered species list. Possible restoration sites have been proposed for the San Clemente Island and Santa Barbara Island areas. Reintroduction of farming abalone to the wild has been proposed, with these abalone having special tags to help track the population.

== Species ==
The number of species that are recognized within the genus Haliotis has fluctuated over time, and depends on the source that is consulted. The number of recognized species ranges from 30 to 130. As of 2025, 76 extant species and 25 fossil species were listed as accepted in MolluscaBase. This list finds a compromise using the WoRMS database, plus some species that have been added, for a total of 57. The majority of abalone have not been rated for conservation status. Those that have been reviewed tend to show that the abalone in general is an animal that is declining in numbers, and will need protection throughout the globe.

=== Extant species ===
Species of abalone
Species	Range	Conservation status
Haliotis alfredensis Bartsch, 1915 (Note: This species, depending on the source is its own species or is a synonym of Haliotis speciosa.)	South Africa	DD^{IUCN}
Haliotis arabiensis Owen, Regter & Van Laethem, 2016	Off Yemen and Oman	NT^{IUCN}
Haliotis asinina Linnaeus, 1758	Philippines; Indonesia; Australia; Japan; Thailand; Vietnam	LC^{IUCN}
Haliotis australis Gmelin, 1791	New Zealand	LC^{IUCN}
Haliotis brazieri Angas, 1869	Eastern Australia	NT^{IUCN}
Haliotis clathrata Reeve, 1846	Seychelles; Comores; Madagascar; Mauritius; Kenya	LC^{IUCN}
Haliotis coccoradiata Reeve, 1846	Eastern Australia	LC^{IUCN}
Haliotis corrugata Wood, 1828	California, US; Baja California, Mexico	CR^{IUCN}, Species of Concern National Marine Fisheries Service; Vulnerable (global) and imperiled (California) California Department of Fish and Wildlife
Haliotis cracherodii Leach, 1814	California, US; Baja California, Mexico	CR^{IUCN}, Vulnerable (Global, Nation: US, State: California) California Department of Fish and Wildlife; Listed endangered National Marine Fisheries Service
Haliotis cyclobates Péron & Lesueur, 1816	Southern Australia	LC^{IUCN}
Haliotis dalli Henderson, 1915	Galapagos Islands, western Colombia	DD^{IUCN}
Haliotis discus Reeve, 1846	Japan; South Korea	EN^{IUCN}
Haliotis dissona (Iredale, 1929)	Australia; New Caledonia	LC^{IUCN}
Haliotis diversicolor Reeve, 1846	Japan; Australia; Southeast Asia	DD^{IUCN}
Haliotis dringii Reeve, 1846	Australia; Papua New Guinea; Philippines; Sri Lanka; Thailand	LC^{IUCN}
Haliotis drogini Owen & Reitz, 2012	Cocos Island	VU^{IUCN}
Haliotis elegans Koch & Philippi, 1844	Western Australia	LC^{IUCN}
Haliotis exigua Dunker, R.W., 1877 (synonym of H. diversicolor)	Japan	Not evaluated
Haliotis fatui Geiger, 1999	Tonga Mariana Islands	DD^{IUCN}
Haliotis fulgens Philippi, 1845	California, US; Baja California, Mexico	CR^{IUCN}, Vulnerable (Global, State: California California Department of Fish and Wildlife); Species of Concern NMFS
Haliotis geigeri Owen, 2014	São Tomé and Príncipe Islands	VU^{IUCN}
Haliotis gigantea Gmelin, 1791	Japan	EN^{IUCN}
Haliotis glabra Gmelin, 1791	Philippines; Vietnam	LC^{IUCN}
Haliotis iris Gmelin, 1791	New Zealand	LC^{IUCN}
Haliotis jacnensis Reeve, 1846	Japan; Nicobar Islands; Ryukyu Islands; Pacific Islands;	LC^{IUCN}
Haliotis kamtschatkana Jonas, 1845	Western North America	EN^{IUCN}, Imperiled (Alaska, British Columbia), Vulnerable (global, US), critically imperiled (California); Species of Concern NMFS
Haliotis laevigata Donovan, 1808	South Australia; Tasmania	VU^{IUCN}
Haliotis madaka (Habe, 1977)	Japan; South Korea	EN^{IUCN}
Haliotis mariae Wood, 1828	Oman; Yemen	EN^{IUCN}
Haliotis marmorata Linnaeus, 1758	Liberia; Ivory Coast; Ghana	LC^{IUCN}
Haliotis melculus (Iredale, 1927)	Australia (New South Wales, Queensland)	VU^{IUCN}
Haliotis midae Linnaeus, 1758	South Africa	EN^{IUCN}
Haliotis mykonosensis Owen, Hanavan & Hall, 2001	Greece; Turkey; Tunisia	LC^{IUCN}
Haliotis ovina Gmelin, 1791	Thailand; Vietnam; southern part of the Pacific Ocean; Andaman Islands; Maldives; Ryukyu Islands	LC^{IUCN}
Haliotis parva Linnaeus, 1758	South Africa; Angola	DD^{IUCN}
Haliotis pirimoana Walton, Marshall, Rawlence & Spencer, 2024	Manawatāwhi / Three Kings Islands, New Zealand	Not evaluated
Haliotis planata G. B. Sowerby II, 1882	Ryukyu Islands; Sri Lanka; Indonesia; Fiji; Andaman Sea	LC^{IUCN}
Haliotis pourtalesii Dall, 1881	Eastern US; Gulf of Mexico; Eastern South America; northern Colombia	DD^{IUCN}
Haliotis pulcherrima Gmelin, 1791	Polynesia	DD^{IUCN}
Haliotis queketti E.A. Smith, 1910	Eastern Africa	DD^{IUCN}
Haliotis roei Gray, 1826	Australia	NT^{IUCN}
Haliotis rubiginosa Reeve, 1846	Lord Howe Island	CR^{IUCN}
Haliotis rubra Leach, 1814	Southern and Eastern Australia	VU^{IUCN}
Haliotis rufescens Swainson, 1822	Western North America	CR^{IUCN}, apparently secure (global, US); critically imperiled (Canada)
Haliotis rugosa Lamarck, 1822	South Africa; Madagascar; Mauritius; Red Sea	LC^{IUCN}
Haliotis scalaris (Leach, 1814)	Southern and Western Australia	LC^{IUCN}
Haliotis semiplicata Menke, 1843	Western Australia	LC^{IUCN}
Haliotis sorenseni Bartsch, 1940	California, US; Baja California, Mexico	CR^{IUCN}, critically imperiled (global, US, California); Endangered NMFS
Haliotis spadicea Donovan, 1808	South Africa	LC^{IUCN}
Haliotis speciosa Reeve, 1846 (synonym of H. tuberculata)	Eastern South Africa	Not evaluated
Haliotis squamosa Gray, 1826	Southern Madagascar	DD^{IUCN}
Haliotis stomatiaeformis Reeve, 1846	Malta; Sicily	VU^{IUCN}
Haliotis supertexta Lischke, 1870 (synonym of H. diversicolor)	Japan; Sao Tome	Not evaluated
Haliotis thailandis Dekker & Patamakanthin, 2001 (synonym of H. papulata)	Andaman Sea	Not evaluated
Haliotis tuberculata Linnaeus, 1758	Ireland (introduced); Channel Islands; Azores; Canary Islands; Madeira; Brittany; Great Britain	VU^{IUCN}
Haliotis unilateralis Lamarck, 1822	Gulf of Aqaba; East Africa; Seychelles;	LC^{IUCN}
Haliotis varia Linnaeus, 1758	Mascarene Basin; Red Sea; Sri Lanka; Western Pacific;	LC^{IUCN}
Haliotis virginea Gmelin, 1791	New Zealand; Chatham Islands; Auckland Islands; Campbell Island	LC^{IUCN}
Haliotis walallensis Stearns, 1899	Western North America	CR^{IUCN}

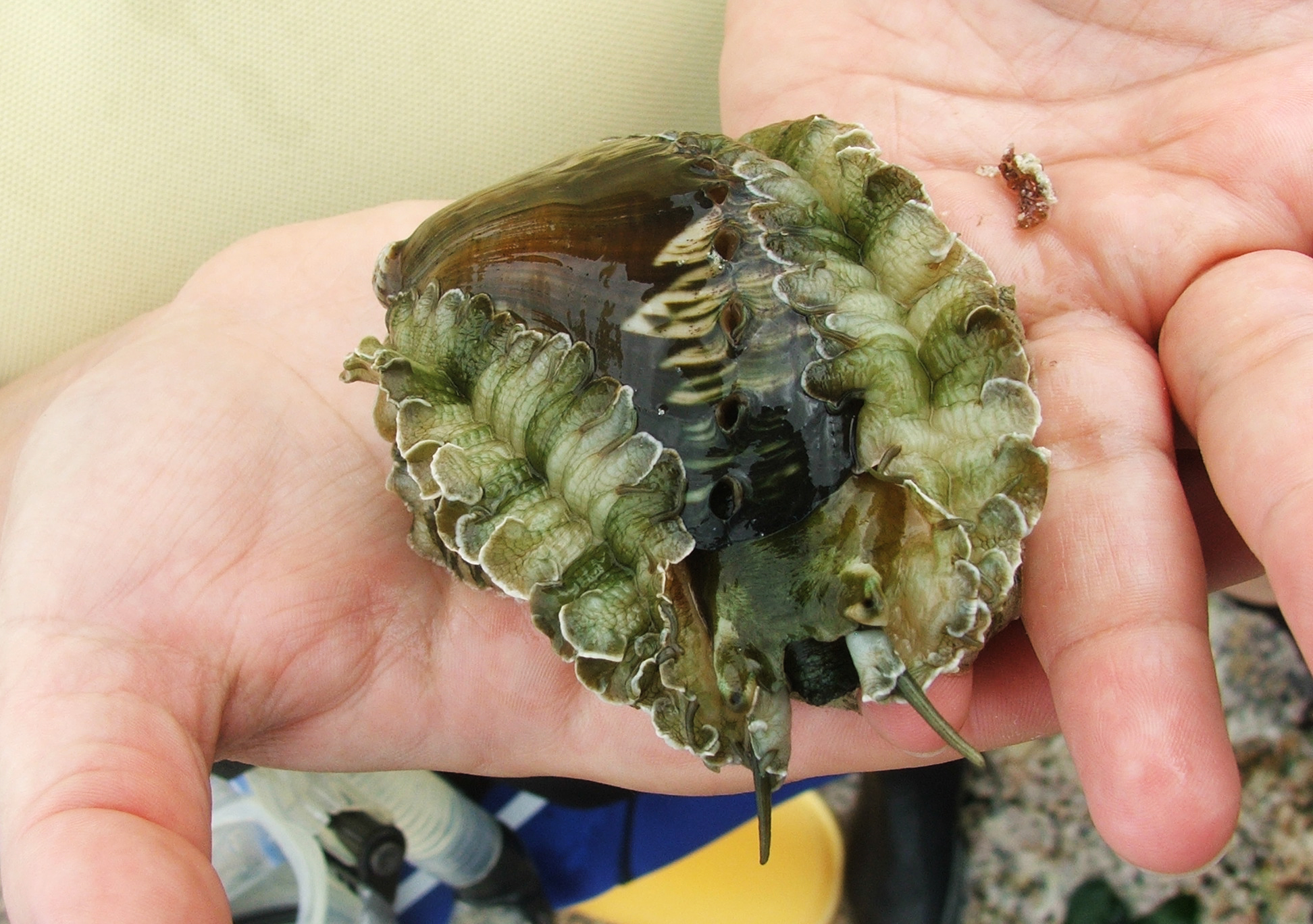
A dorsal view of a live ass's ear abalone, Haliotis asinina

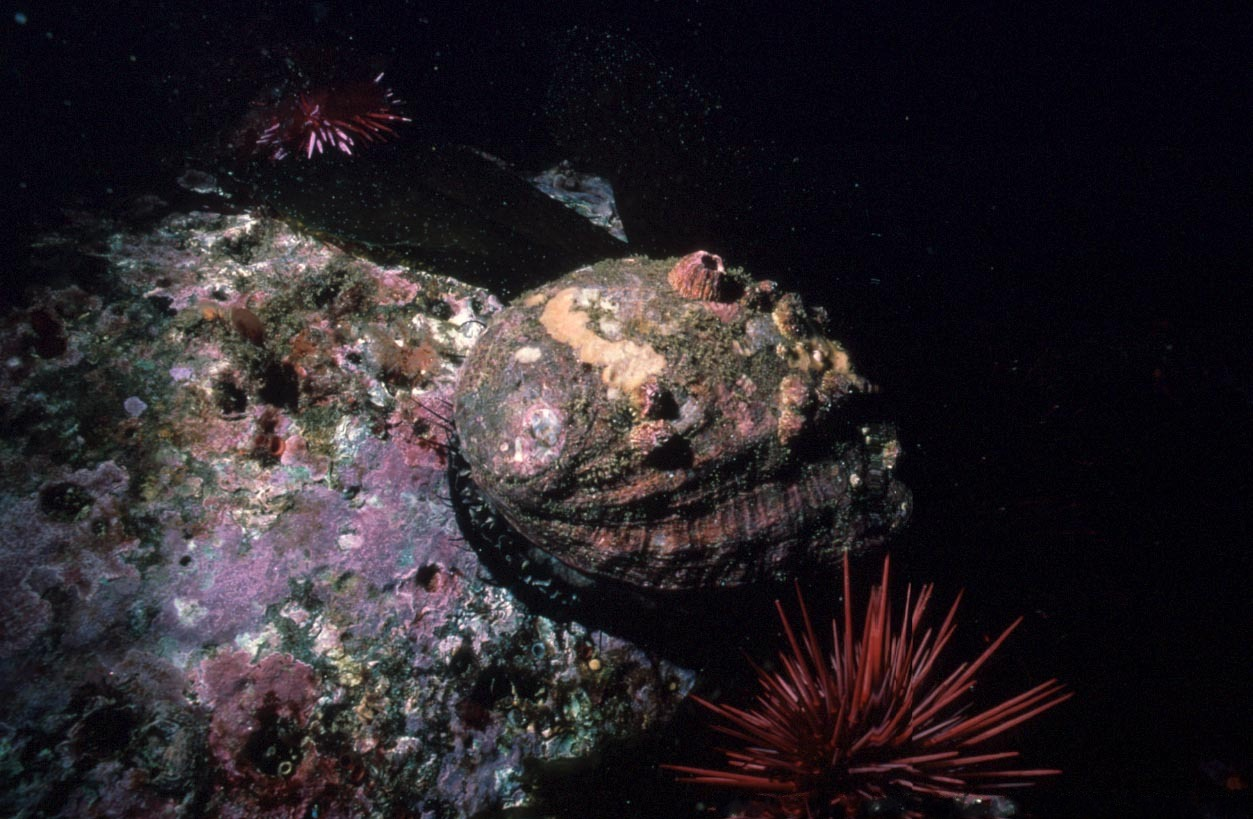
The pink abalone, Haliotis corrugata

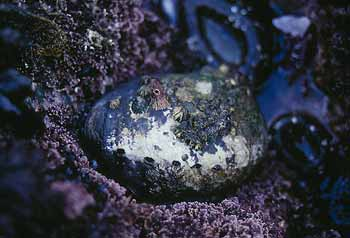
The black abalone, Haliotis cracherodii

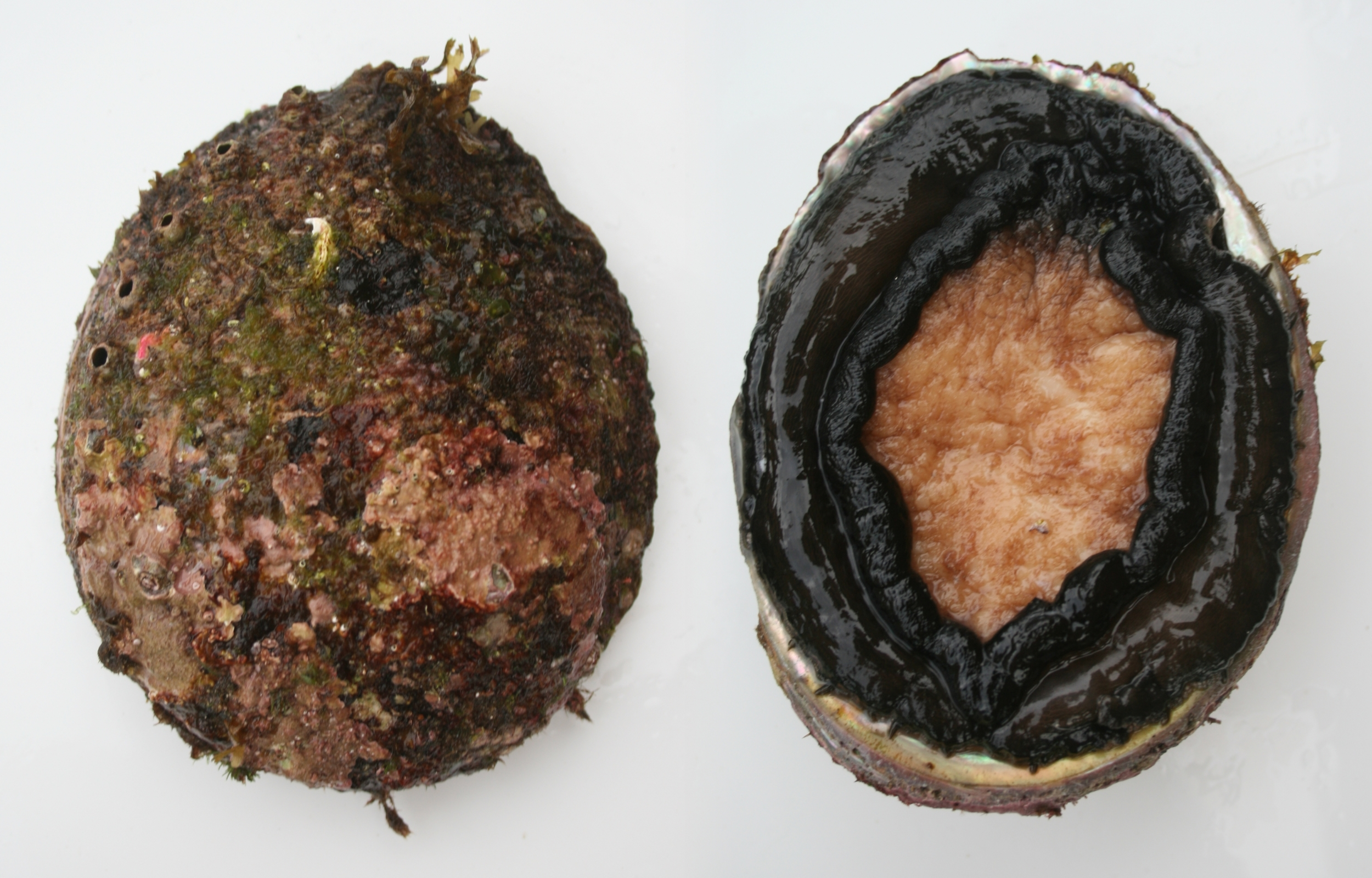
Dorsal (left) and ventral (right) views of the blacklip abalone, Haliotis rubra

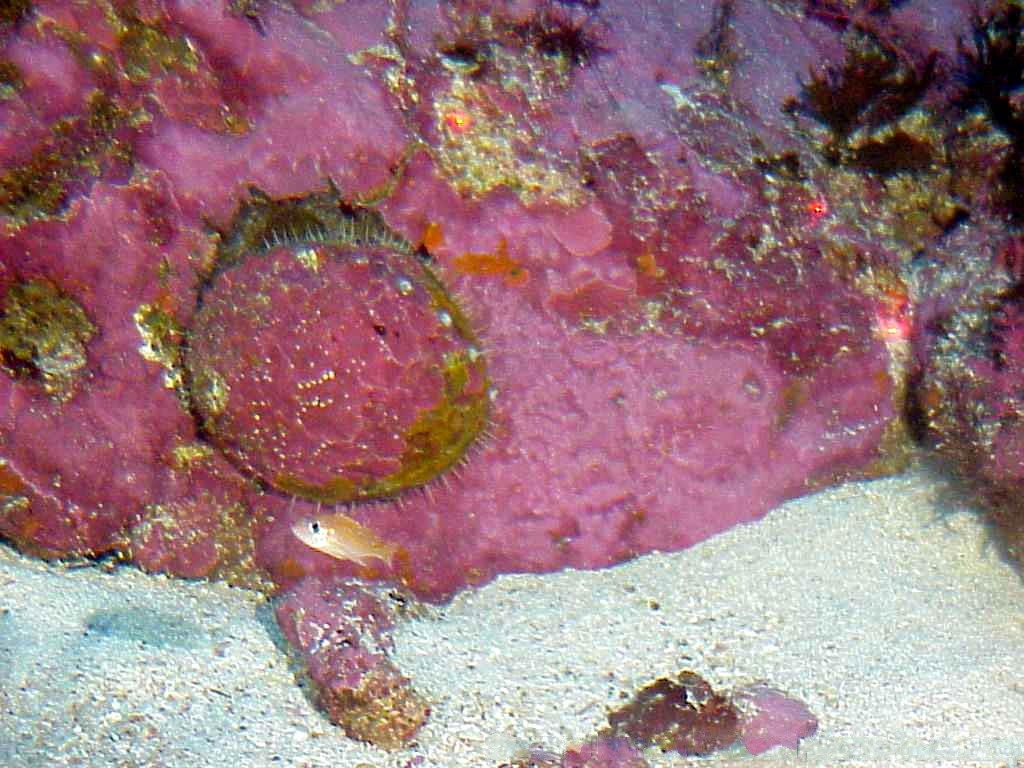
The white abalone, Haliotis sorenseni

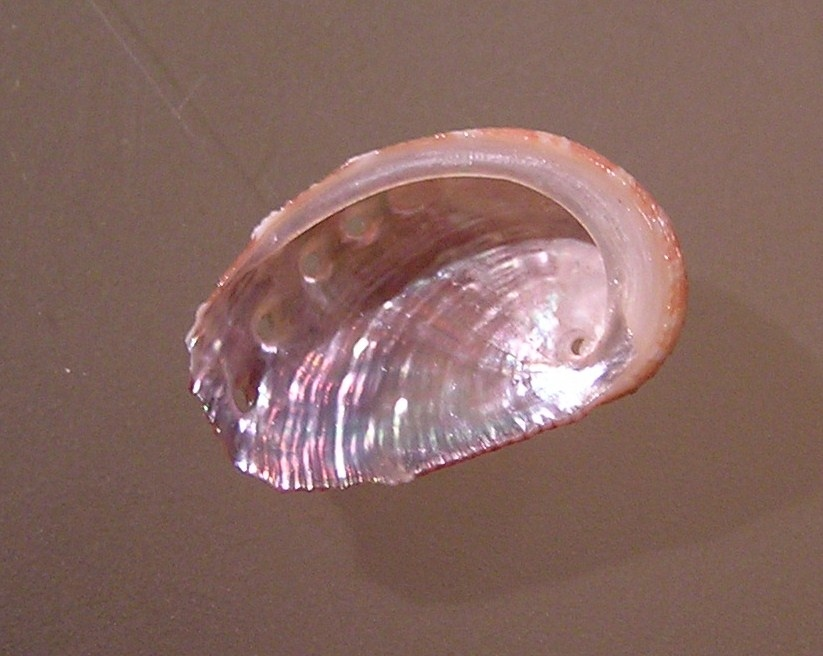
A shell of Haliotis varia form dohrniana

=== Fossil species ===
- †Haliotis amabilis (Itoigawa & Tomida, 1982)
- †Haliotis antillesensis Sohl, 1992
- †Haliotis benoisti Cossmann, 1896 (Aquitaine, France)
- †Haliotis bertinii Forli, Dell'Angelo, Ciappelli & Taviani, 2003
- †Haliotis flemingi Powell, 1938 (New Zealand)
- †Haliotis hokiangaensis Eagle, 2002
- †Haliotis kochibei Hatai, Kotaka & H. Noda, 1970
- †Haliotis koikei Shibata, 1957
- †Haliotis koticki Hertlein, 1937
- †Haliotis kurosakiensis Kotaka & Ogasawara, 1974
- †Haliotis lamellosoides Sacco, 1897
- †Haliotis lasia Woodring, 1932
- †Haliotis lomaensis Anderson, 1902
- †Haliotis mathesonensis (Eagle, 1996)
- †Haliotis matihetihensis (Eagle, 1999)
- †Haliotis mooraboolensis McCoy, 1876
- †Haliotis naevosoides McCoy, 1876
- †Haliotis ovata Michelotti, 1847
- †Haliotis ovinoides McCoy, 1876
- †Haliotis plioetrusca Dominici, Forli, Brunetti & Taviani, 2025
- †Haliotis powelli C. A. Fleming, 1952
- †Haliotis stalennuyi Owen & Berschauer, 2017
- †Haliotis torrei Ruggieri, 1990
- †Haliotis volhynica Eichwald, 1829
- †Haliotis waitemataensis Powell, 1938

== See also ==
- Delicacy
- Abalone shriveling syndrome-associated virus
