= Haliotis melculus =

Conservation status
- Vulnerable (IUCN 3.1)

Scientific classification
- Kingdom: Animalia
- Phylum: Mollusca
- Class: Gastropoda
- Subclass: Vetigastropoda
- Order: Lepetellida
- Superfamily: Haliotoidea
- Family: Haliotidae
- Genus: Haliotis
- Species: H. melculus

Binomial name
- Haliotis melculus (Iredale, 1927)

Synonyms
- Haliotis ethologus (Iredale, 1927); Marinauris ethologus Iredale, 1927; Marinauris melculus Iredale, 1927

Species of gastropod

Haliotis melculus, the honey abalone, is a species of sea snail, a marine gastropod mollusk in the family Haliotidae, the abalone.

== Distribution ==
This marine species is endemic to Australia and occurs off New South Wales and Queensland.
