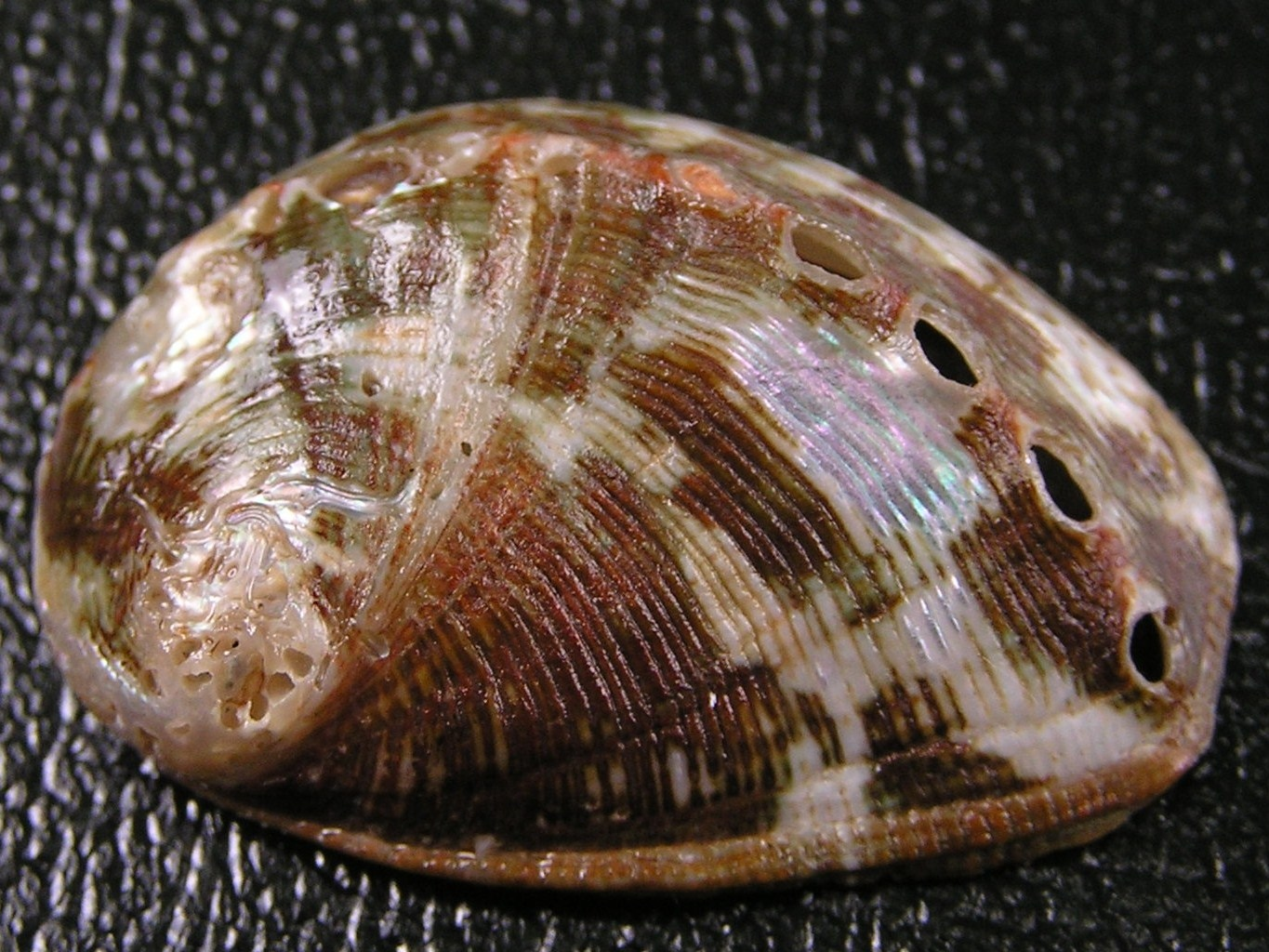
- Apical view of a shell of Haliotis marmorata

Conservation status
- Least Concern (IUCN 3.1)

Scientific classification
- Kingdom: Animalia
- Phylum: Mollusca
- Class: Gastropoda
- Subclass: Vetigastropoda
- Order: Lepetellida
- Superfamily: Haliotoidea
- Family: Haliotidae
- Genus: Haliotis
- Species: H. marmorata

Binomial name
- Haliotis marmorata Linnaeus, 1758

Synonyms
- Haliotis decussata Philippi, 1850; Haliotis guineensis Gmelin, 1791; Haliotis rosacea Reeve, 1846; Haliotis strigata Weinkauff, 1883; Haliotis virginea Reeve, 1846 ((invalid: junior homonym of Haliotis virginea Gmelin, 1791))

= Haliotis marmorata =

Species of gastropod

Haliotis marmorata is a species of sea snail, a marine gastropod mollusk in the family Haliotidae, the abalones.

== Description ==
The size of the shell varies between 40 mm and 60 mm. "The depressed shell has an oval shape. The distance of the apex from the margin is one-eighth to one-tenth the length of the shell. The shell is closely, finely spirally striate and decussated by still finer and closer growth striae. The coloration is reddish-brown, generally with white patches. The right side is not quite as much curved as the left, and the shell is rather depressed. It is quite solid and heavy. The outside is dark reddish-brown, sometimes without markings, but usually showing angular patches of white or greenish around the middle part of the body whorl, and on the spire. The spiral striae of the surface are fine, close, and often disposed in pairs. They are decussated by very close fine radiating striae. The spire is low. It is inside silvery and smooth except for fine spiral folds in the nacre, which has light green and red reflections. The columellar plate is flat, wide (its width one-sixth to one-seventh the width of the shell). It is generally not sloping inward or slightly so, and not distinctly truncate below. The cavity of the spire is wholly or partly concealed if the plane of the peristome is held at a right angle to the line of vision. The five or six oval perforations are situated in slight prominences, separated by spaces greater than their own length."

== Distribution ==
This species occurs in the Atlantic Ocean off the African coast (Senegal to Gabon) and off São Tomé and Príncipe.
