= Haliotis drogini =

Conservation status
- Vulnerable (IUCN 3.1)

Scientific classification
- Kingdom: Animalia
- Phylum: Mollusca
- Class: Gastropoda
- Subclass: Vetigastropoda
- Order: Lepetellida
- Superfamily: Haliotoidea
- Family: Haliotidae
- Genus: Haliotis
- Species: H. drogini

Binomial name
- Haliotis drogini Owen & Reitz, 2012

Species of gastropod

Haliotis drogini is a species of sea snail, a marine gastropod mollusc in the family Haliotidae, the abalone.
