= Haliotis mykonosensis =

Conservation status
- Least Concern (IUCN 3.1)

Scientific classification
- Kingdom: Animalia
- Phylum: Mollusca
- Class: Gastropoda
- Subclass: Vetigastropoda
- Order: Lepetellida
- Superfamily: Haliotoidea
- Family: Haliotidae
- Genus: Haliotis
- Species: H. mykonosensis

Binomial name
- Haliotis mykonosensis Owen, Hanavan & Hall, 2001

Species of gastropod

Haliotis mykonosensis is a species of sea snail, a marine gastropod mollusk in the family Haliotidae, the abalone.

== Description ==
The size of the shell varies between 25 mm and 50 mm.

== Distribution ==
This species occurs in the Mediterranean Sea from Italy and Corsica west to Greece and western Turkey.
