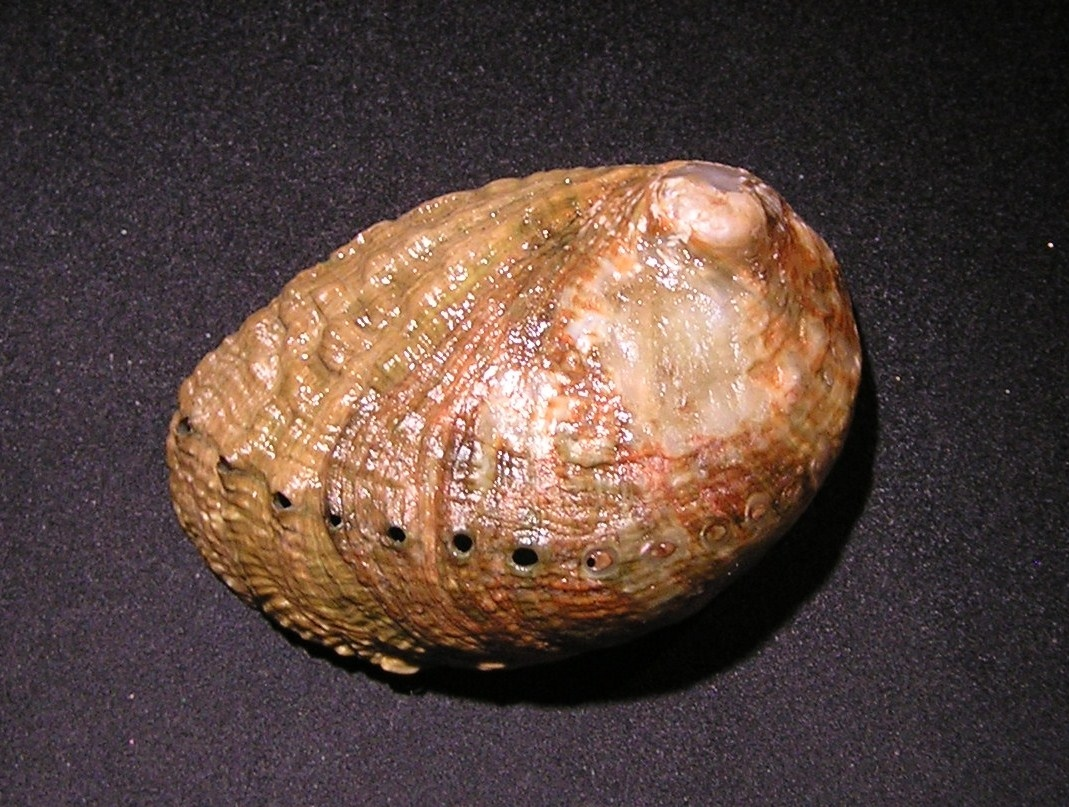
- View of a shell of Haliotis fatui

Conservation status
- Data Deficient (IUCN 3.1)

Scientific classification
- Kingdom: Animalia
- Phylum: Mollusca
- Class: Gastropoda
- Subclass: Vetigastropoda
- Order: Lepetellida
- Superfamily: Haliotoidea
- Family: Haliotidae
- Genus: Haliotis
- Species: H. fatui

Binomial name
- Haliotis fatui Geiger, 1999

= Haliotis fatui =

Species of gastropod

Haliotis fatui is a species of sea snail, a marine gastropod mollusk in the family Haliotidae, the abalone.

== Description ==
The size of the subcircular to oval-oblong shell varies between 30 mm and 60 mm. It is closely related to Haliotis varia Linnaeus, 1758, but differs in its shell and epipodial characters. The coloration of the shell is brown, yellow brown or dark green.

== Distribution ==
This marine species occurs in the central Indo-Pacific
