= Haliotis dissona =

Conservation status
- Least Concern (IUCN 3.1)

Scientific classification
- Kingdom: Animalia
- Phylum: Mollusca
- Class: Gastropoda
- Subclass: Vetigastropoda
- Order: Lepetellida
- Family: Haliotidae
- Genus: Haliotis
- Species: H. dissona

Binomial name
- Haliotis dissona (Iredale T., 1929)

Synonyms
- Haliotis (Haliotis) dissona (Iredale T., 1929); Sanhaliotis dissona Iredale, 1929

Species of gastropod

Haliotis dissona is a species of sea snail, a marine gastropod mollusk in the family Haliotidae, the abalone.

== Description ==
The length of the shell varies between 9 mm and 35 mm.

== Distribution ==
This species occurs in the Pacific Ocean off Fiji, Mariana Islands, New Caledonia, Tonga; and off Queensland, Australia.
