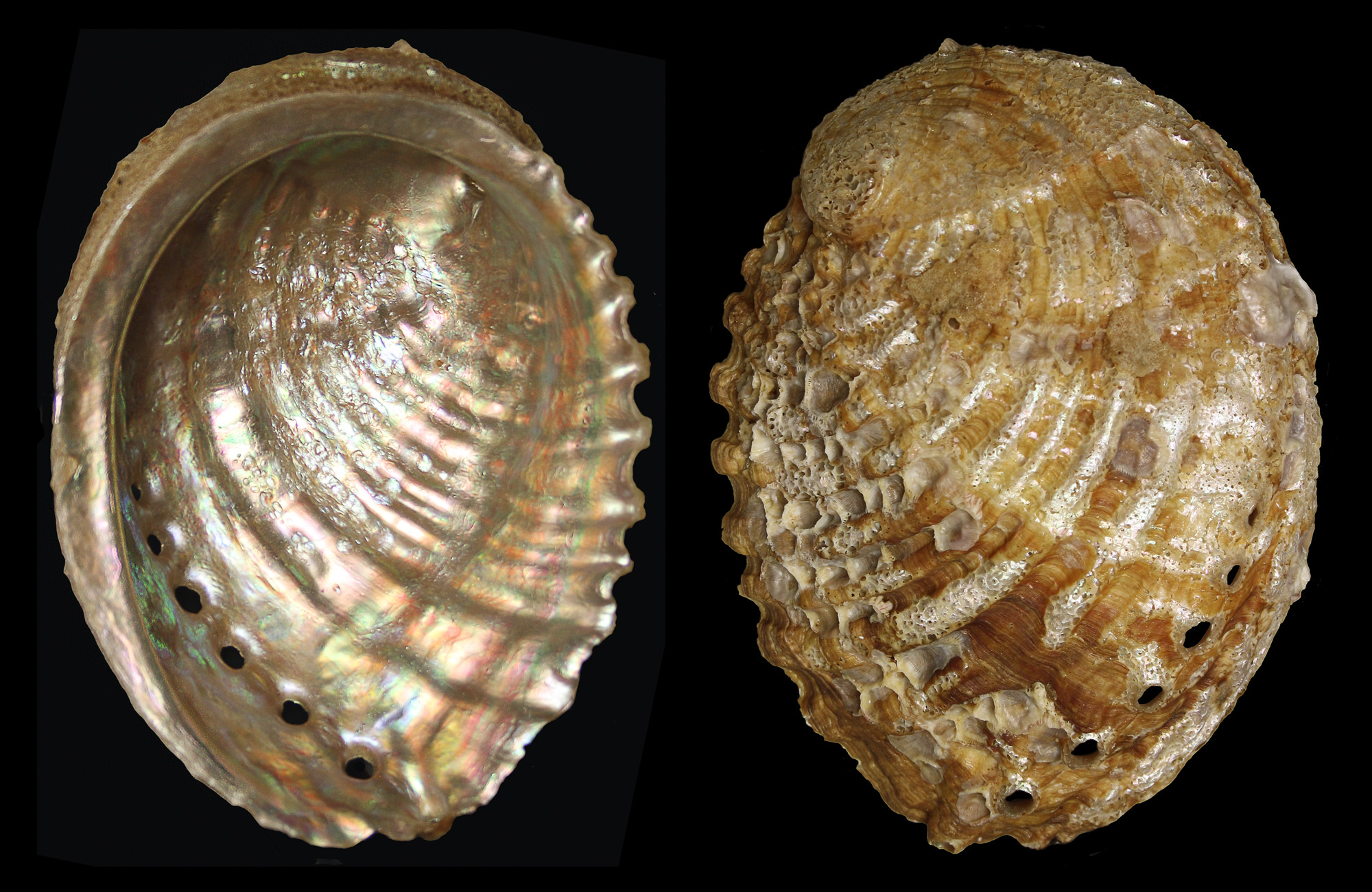
- The shell of Haliotis mariae, a close relative of Haliotis arabiensis, due to the lack of non-copy written images of Haliotis arabiensis

Scientific classification
- Kingdom: Animalia
- Phylum: Mollusca
- Class: Gastropoda
- Subclass: Vetigastropoda
- Order: Lepetellida
- Family: Haliotidae
- Genus: Haliotis
- Species: H. arabiensis

Binomial name
- Haliotis arabiensis R. S. Owen, Regter & Van Laethem, 2016

= Haliotis arabiensis =

Species of mollusc

Haliotis arabiensis is a species of marine gastropod. This species was first described in 2016 by Buzz Owen, Wilco Regter, and Kirsten Van Laethem.

== Description ==
This species is characterized as having small shells, typically 35 to 40 mm. The shells have about 4 to 5 holes lining the anterior of the shell. The coloration of the shells vary, ranging from a medium to dark red, to a grey purple, and occasionally found with green pigmentation of the shell.

== Habitat ==
This species is found on the Arabian Peninsula of Omen and the United Arab Emirates in marine habitats. This species is typically found hidden under marine structures, such as coral and rocks, at a depth range of 12-18 m.
