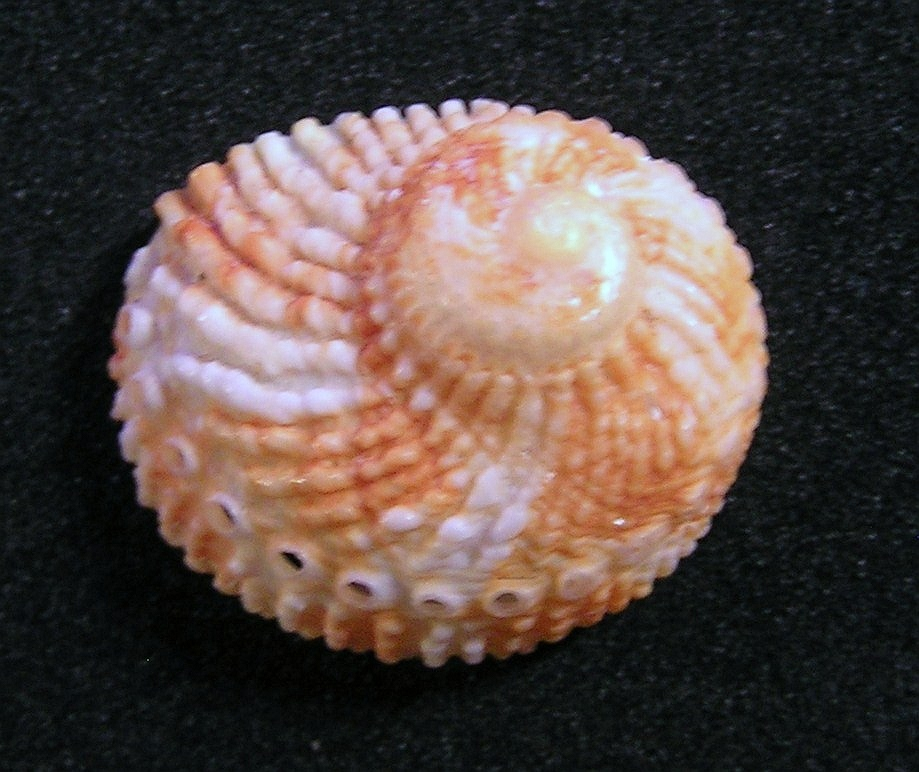

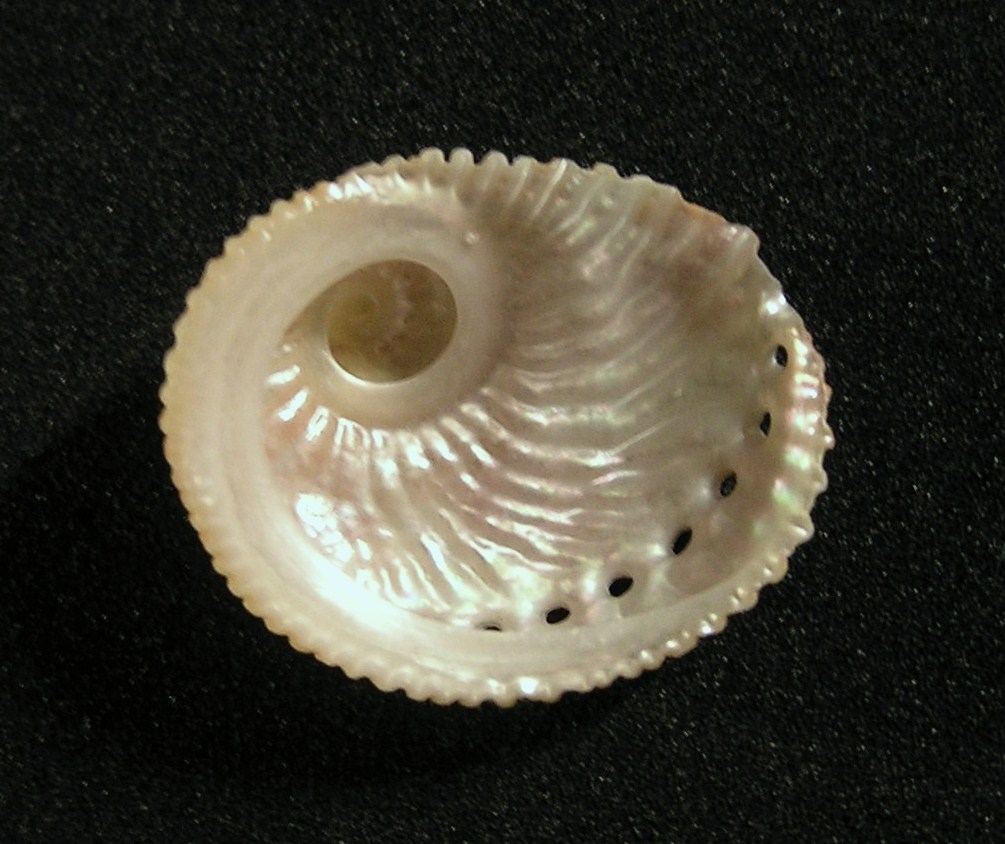

Conservation status
- Data Deficient (IUCN 3.1)

Scientific classification
- Kingdom: Animalia
- Phylum: Mollusca
- Class: Gastropoda
- Subclass: Vetigastropoda
- Order: Lepetellida
- Family: Haliotidae
- Genus: Haliotis
- Species: H. pulcherrima

Binomial name
- Haliotis pulcherrima Gmelin, 1791

= Haliotis pulcherrima =

Species of gastropod

Haliotis pulcherrima is a species of sea snail, a marine gastropod mollusk in the family Haliotidae, the abalone.

== Description ==
Haliotis pulcherrima is commonly referred to the "Most Beautiful Abalone" (directly translated from Latin). Its shell size ranges from 18 to 40 mm. This Abalone's shell is iridescent and creamy-white on the inside. It can be found mainly in East Polynesia. It is edible as with most abalone.

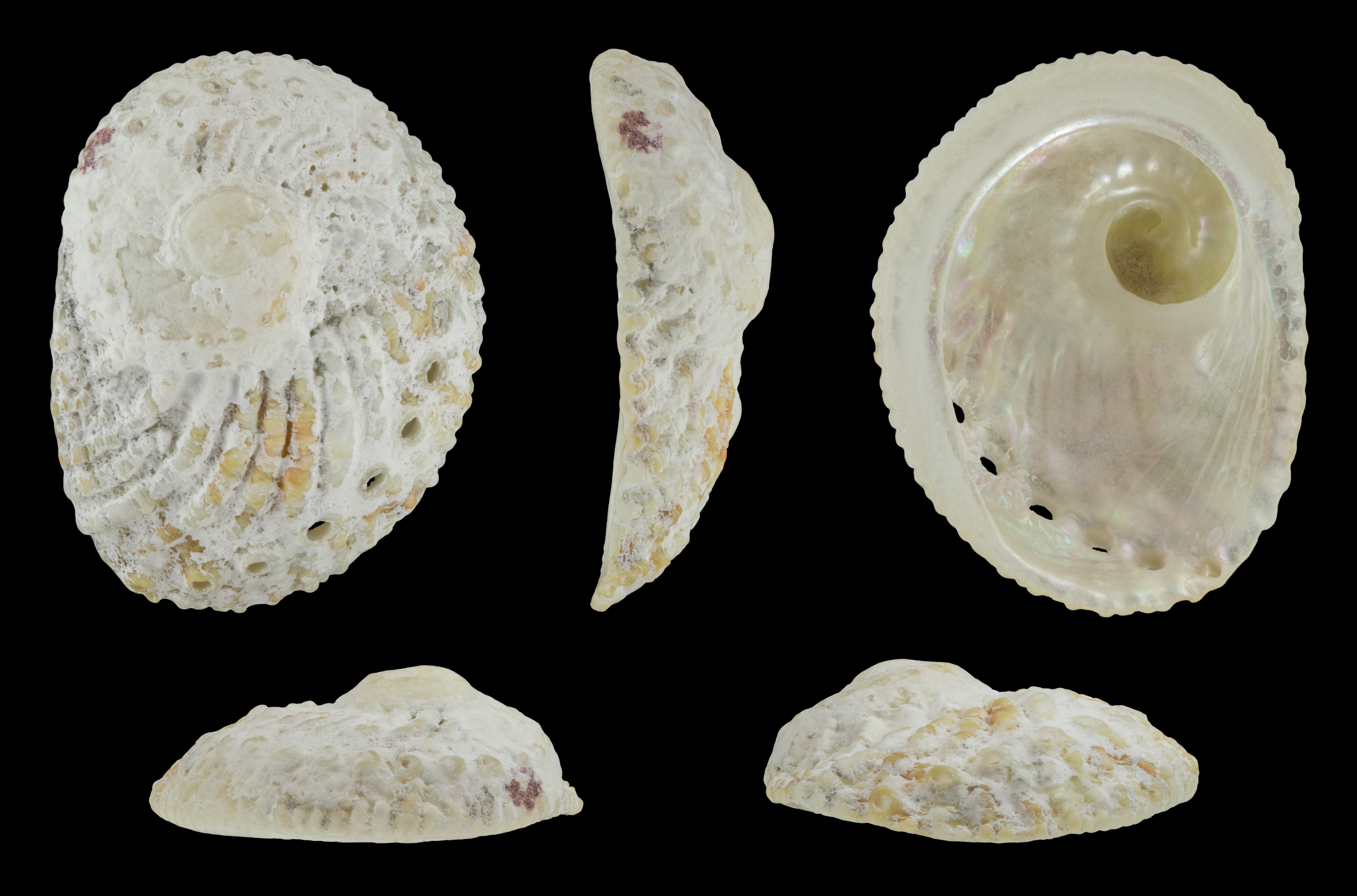
5 views of a Haliotis pulcherrima shell

"The small, flattened shell has a rounded-oval shape. The distance of the apex from the margin is about one-fourth the length of the shell. The surface is finely corrugated by radiating deep folds. The generally eight perforations are small, round and tubular. The row is bordered on each side by a shallow channel. This little shell is straighter on the right than on the left margin. The color is whitish or flesh-colored with broad oblique red rays. The surface is finely corrugated. The folds are strong, close and numerous, not extending quite to the row of holes. Their summits are crenulated by inconspicuous spiral striae. Outside of the row of holes the surface slopes flatly to the strong angle or carina at the columellar margin. And the descending folds on this portion are cut into granules by spiral striae. The spire is somewhat elevated. Inside it is silvery. The columellar shelf is flat and rather wide."

== Distribution ==
This marine species is found in French Polynesia and the Pitcairn Islands.
