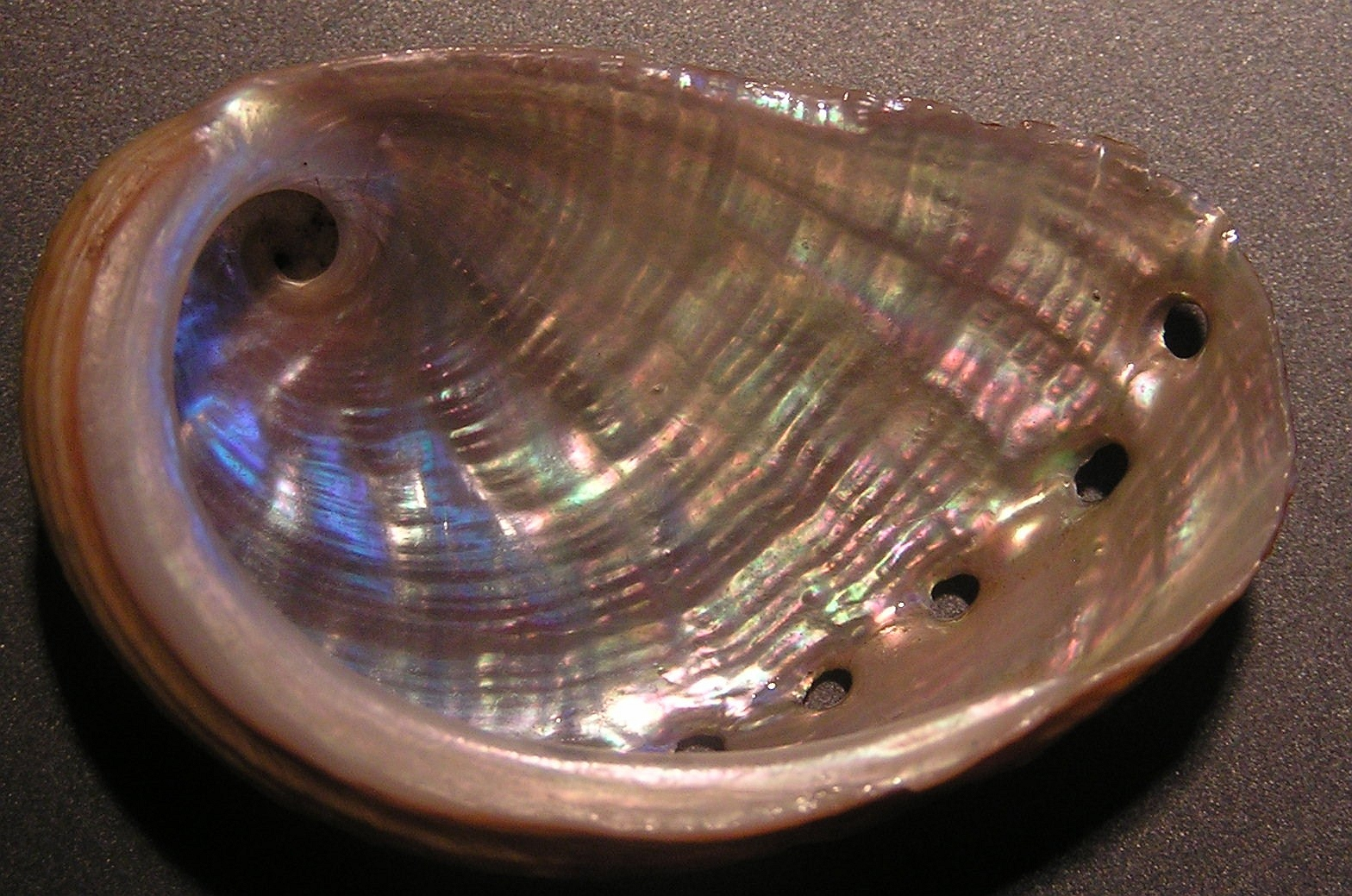
- Nacreous interior of Haliotis stomatiaeformis

Conservation status
- Vulnerable (IUCN 3.1)

Scientific classification
- Kingdom: Animalia
- Phylum: Mollusca
- Class: Gastropoda
- Subclass: Vetigastropoda
- Order: Lepetellida
- Family: Haliotidae
- Genus: Haliotis
- Species: H. stomatiaeformis

Binomial name
- Haliotis stomatiaeformis Reeve, 1846

Synonyms
- Haliotis neglecta Philippi, 1848

= Haliotis stomatiaeformis =

Species of gastropod

Haliotis stomatiaeformis is a species of sea snail, a marine gastropod mollusc in the family Haliotidae, the abalones. It is endemic to a small portion of the Mediterranean Sea, off the coasts of Sicily and Malta.

Geiger designated this species as a synonym of Haliotis squamata Reeve, 1846, itself considered by WoRMS as the subspecies Haliotis diversicolor squamata Reeve, 1846.

== Description ==
The size of the shell varies between 21 mm and 50 mm. "The small shell has an oval shape. The spire is subterminal. The shell is sculptured with clearly, deeply cut spiral cords and radiating folds, which on the body whorl project as little scales on the spiral lirae. The 3 to 5 subcircular holes are somewhat tubular. The right side is decidedly straighter than the left, the convexity being variable. The color of the shell is brown, variously marked with white and green. The spiral lirae are deeply cut and number 24-30 (counting along the lip edge) exclusive of 5 or 6 below the row of holes. They are crossed by numerous uneven radiating folds, those on the later part appearing as projecting lamellae across the riblets. The 5 or 6 unequal spiral cords between the row of holes and the columella are more or less beaded or scaly. The spire is small and not much elevated. Its distance from the nearest margin is one-fifth to one-seventh the total length of the shell. The interior surface is silvery and iridescent. The columellar plate is wide above, gradually narrowing and not at all truncate toward the base."

"The species has a very rough, sharply sculptured exterior, and .the spire-cavity is concealed by the wide columellar lip."

== Distribution ==
This marine species occurs in the Mediterranean Sea off Sicily, Lampedusa and Malta.
