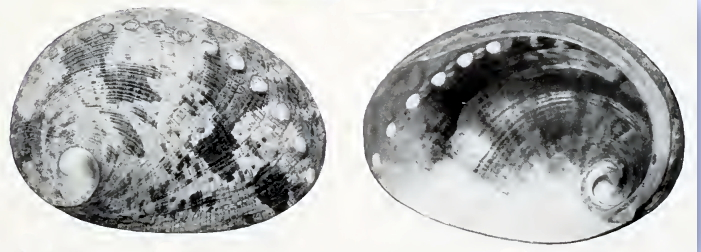
- 1915 photo with two views of a shell of Haliotis alfredensis

Conservation status
- Data Deficient (IUCN 3.1)

Scientific classification
- Kingdom: Animalia
- Phylum: Mollusca
- Class: Gastropoda
- Subclass: Vetigastropoda
- Order: Lepetellida
- Family: Haliotidae
- Genus: Haliotis
- Species: H. alfredensis

Binomial name
- Haliotis alfredensis Bartsch, 1915

= Haliotis alfredensis =

Species of gastropod

Haliotis alfredensis is a species of sea snail in the family Haliotidae, the abalone. It is known commonly as Port Alfred's abalone. It is endemic to the waters off South Africa.

== Description ==
The holotype was 55 by 39.5 millimeters long and 12 millimeters thick. The shell is an elongated oval with chestnut brown mottling and pale olive flecks. The sculpture has radiating, slanting threads on the whorls, which are fine, becoming coarser on the last turn. The spiraling lira become less wavy toward the anterior side. The nacre is pinkish inside and more red in the spire. The spiral sculpture is visible on the inside. The shell is similar in shape to that of Haliotis midae, but without the rugose sculpture; the sculpture is more like that of Haliotis rugosa rugosa, but finer and more regular.
