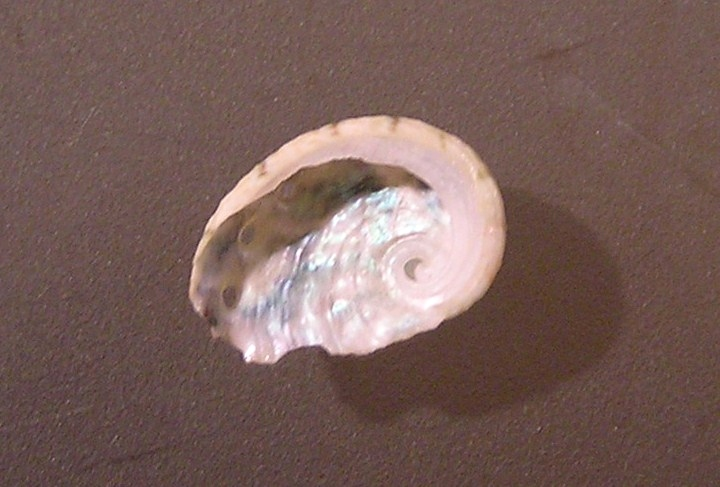

Conservation status
- Least Concern (IUCN 3.1)

Scientific classification
- Kingdom: Animalia
- Phylum: Mollusca
- Class: Gastropoda
- Subclass: Vetigastropoda
- Order: Lepetellida
- Family: Haliotidae
- Genus: Haliotis
- Species: H. unilateralis

Binomial name
- Haliotis unilateralis Lamarck, 1822

= Haliotis unilateralis =

Species of gastropod

Haliotis unilateralis is a species of sea snail, a marine gastropod mollusk in the family Haliotidae, the abalone.

== Description ==
The size of the shell varies between 20 mm and 40 mm.

== Distribution ==
This species occurs in the Red Sea and in the Indian Ocean off Aldabra, Kenya, Madagascar, Mauritius, Mozambique, and Tanzania.

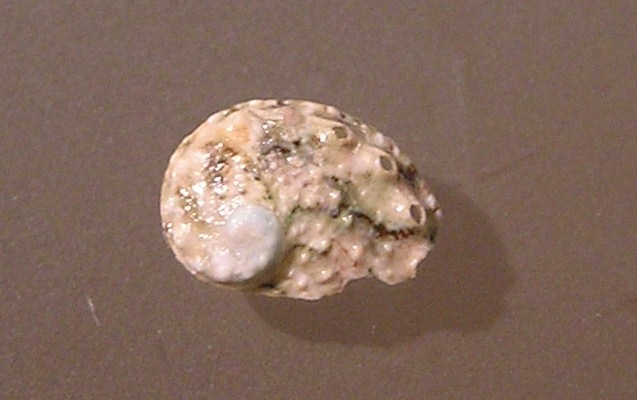
Haliotis unilateralis
