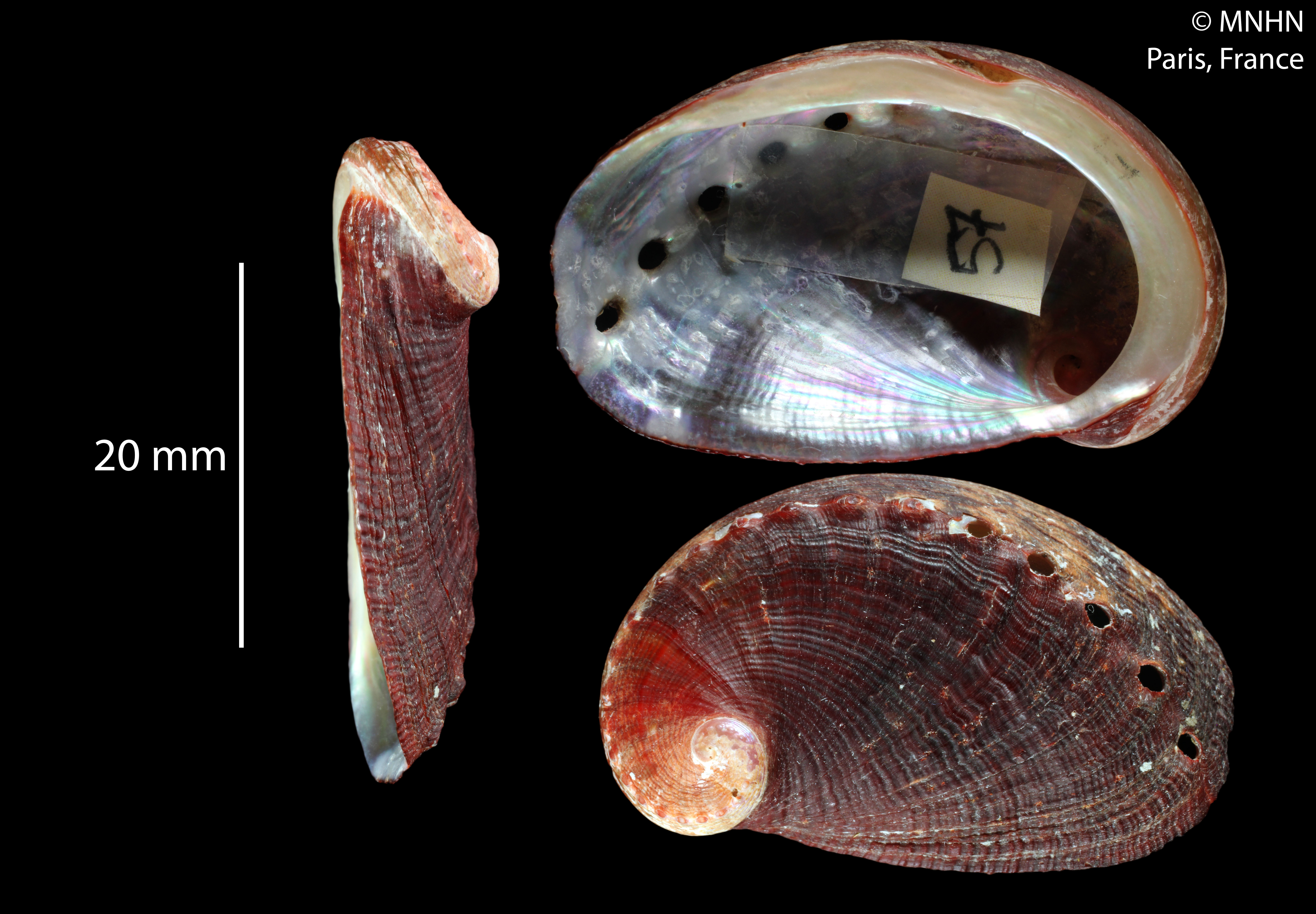

Conservation status
- Vulnerable (IUCN 3.1)

Scientific classification
- Kingdom: Animalia
- Phylum: Mollusca
- Class: Gastropoda
- Subclass: Vetigastropoda
- Order: Lepetellida
- Family: Haliotidae
- Genus: Haliotis
- Species: H. geigeri

Binomial name
- Haliotis geigeri Owen, 2014

= Haliotis geigeri =

Species of gastropod

Haliotis geigeri is a species of sea snail, a marine gastropod mollusc in the family Haliotidae, the abalone.

== Description ==
The size of the oblong, somewhat convex shell varies between 29 mm and 41 mm. The coloration is bright red to reddish brown.

== Distribution ==
This species occurs off and is endemic to São Tomé and Príncipe Islands, Gulf of Guinea, West Africa.
