= Temnotropidae =

Scientific classification
- Kingdom: Animalia
- Phylum: Mollusca
- Class: Gastropoda
- Subclass: Vetigastropoda
- Order: Lepetellida
- Superfamily: Haliotoidea
- Family: †Temnotropidae; Cox, 1960

Extinct family of gastropods

Temnotropidae is an extinct family of fossil sea snails, marine gastropod molluscs in the superfamily Haliotoidea, the abalone and their allies (according to the taxonomy of the Gastropoda by Bouchet & Rocroi, 2005). This family has no subfamilies.

== Genera ==
Genera within the family Temnotropidae include:

- Temnotropis, the type genus
