= Fishing year =

Period of time used in the fishing industry

A fishing year is a period of time used for management and statistical purposes in fisheries. A fishing year may or may not correspond to a calendar year depending on the fishery.

== Northeast Multispecies Fishery ==
In the United States, the Northeast Multispecies Fishery uses a fishing year that begins on May 1 and ends on April 30. This calendar is used by the New England Fishery Management Council for the implementation of rulemaking and Annual Catch Entitlements. In addition, most statistical analysis of the fishery uses the fishing year as a standard time period.

== See also ==
- Academic year
- Fiscal year
- Fishing industry
- Seasonal industry
