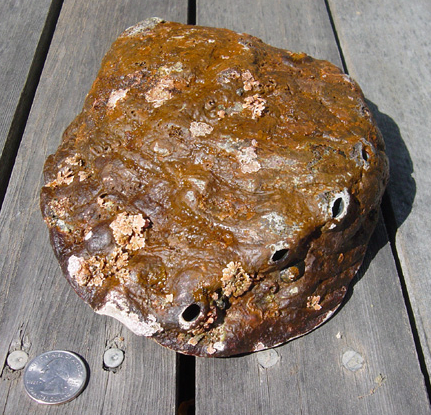
- The shell of a red abalone (family Haliotidae). The coin is a quarter, approx 24 mm across.

Scientific classification
- Domain: Eukaryota
- Kingdom: Animalia
- Phylum: Mollusca
- Class: Gastropoda
- Subclass: Vetigastropoda
- Order: Lepetellida
- Superfamily: Haliotoidea; Rafinesque, 1815

Families
- Family Haliotidae; † Family Temnotropidae

= Haliotoidea =

Superfamily of gastropods

Haliotoidea is a superfamily of sea snails, marine gastropod mollusks in the subclass Vetigastropoda (according to the taxonomy of the Gastropoda by Bouchet & Rocroi, 2005).

== Families ==
The superfamily Haliotoidea contains (according to the taxonomy of the Gastropoda by Bouchet & Rocroi, 2005) two families:

- The recent family Haliotidae, also known as abalones
- The extinct family Temnotropidae.
