= Pāua =

Māori name for some sea snails

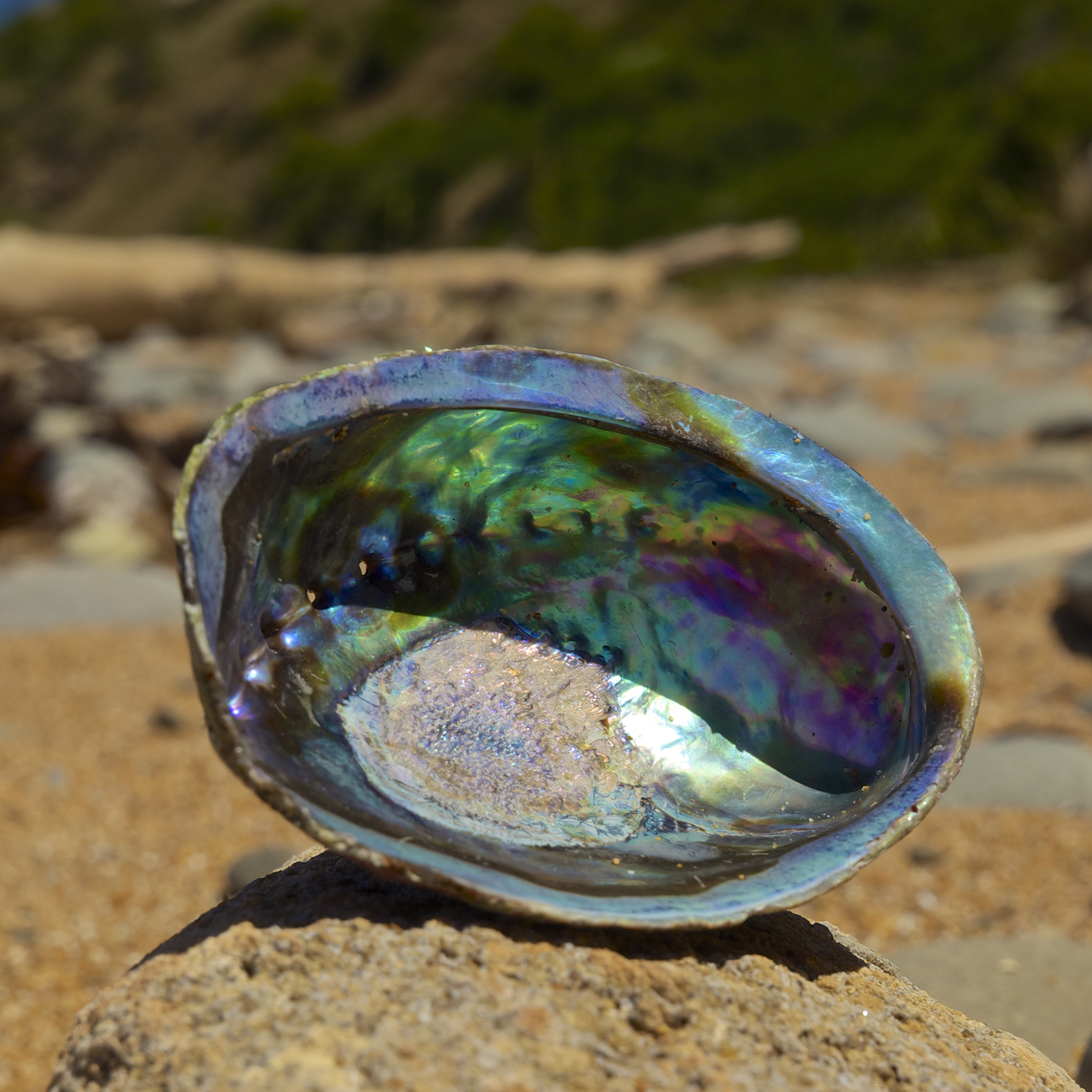
Haliotis iris (blackfoot pāua) shell

Pāua is the Māori name given to four New Zealand species of large edible sea snails, marine gastropod molluscs which belong to the family Haliotidae (in which there is only one genus, Haliotis). It is known in Australia and the United States as abalone, and in the United Kingdom as ormer shells. In New Zealand, these are known as pāua, which (as is the case with nearly all Māori words) is both singular and plural. In New Zealand, the pāua's polished inner shell is widely utilised for jewellery and ornamentation. Pāua populations are affected by climate change through increasing ocean temperatures, ocean acidification, habitat loss and changes in food source availability, and increased severity of storms causing coastal sedimentation.

== Species ==
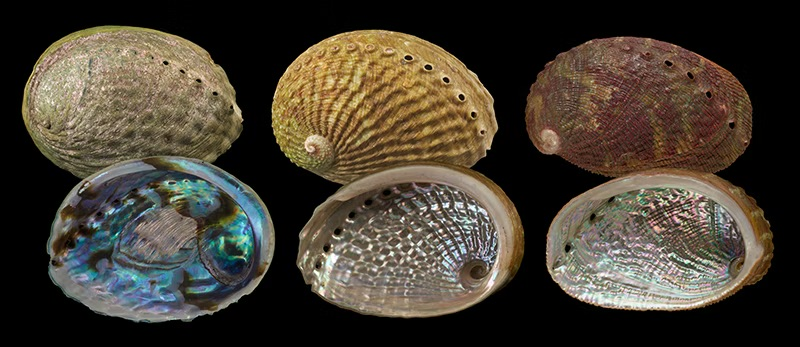
From left to right: black-foot pāua (Haliotis iris), yellow-foot pāua (Haliotis australis), virgin pāua (Haliotis virginea)

There are four species of New Zealand pāua:

Species	Scientific name	Māori and common names
Pāua	Haliotis iris	Blackfoot pāua
Queen pāua	Haliotis australis	Silver pāua, yellowfoot pāua, hihiwa, karariwha
Virgin pāua	Haliotis virginea	Whitefoot pāua, marapeka, koio
Manawatāwhi pāua	Haliotis pirimoana	

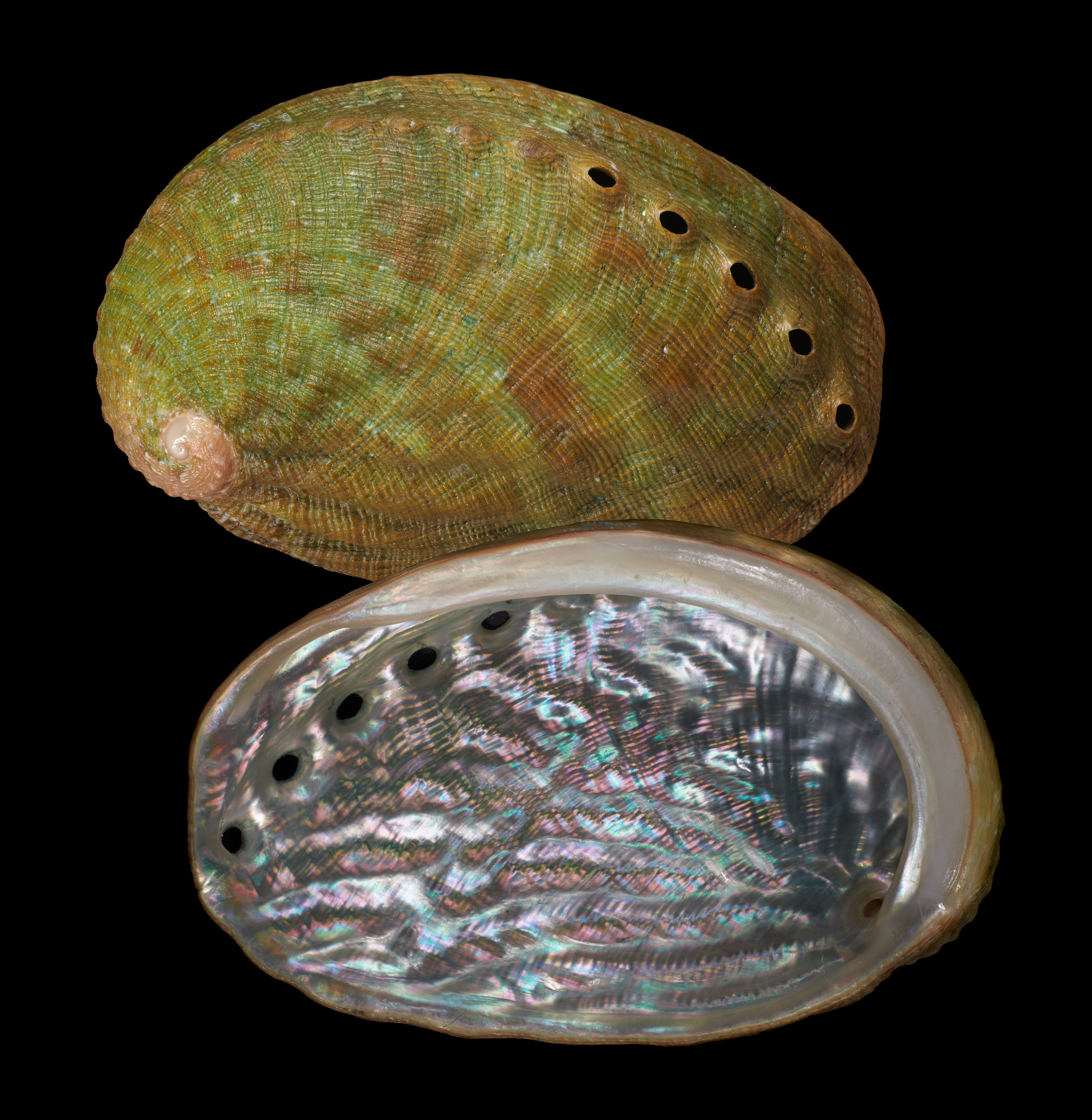
Haliotis pirimoana

H. pirimoana is a small, recently described species endemic to Manawatāwhi / the Three Kings Islands that superficially resembles H. virginea.

== Habitat ==
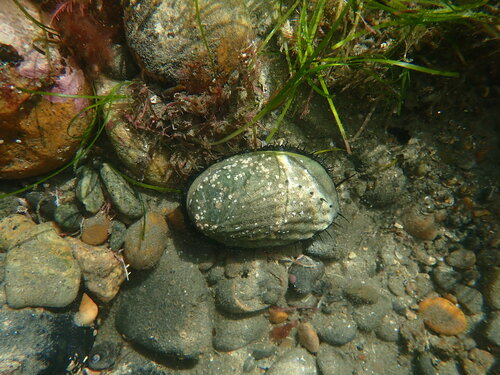
Live Haliotis iris in Southland, NZ

Pāua are commonly found in shallow coastal waters along rocky shorelines in depths of one to fifteen metres (3 to 49 ft). There is clear distinction between juvenile and adult habitats for Haliotis iris: pāua less than seven cm (2.8 in) occur in crevices and under stones in the shallow intertidal zone while adults are found in the subtidal zone.

== Life ==
These large sea snails survive strong tidal surges by clinging to rocks using their large muscular foot. They consume algae.

== Harvesting ==
Pāua are gathered recreationally and commercially, with strict catch limits set for both. For recreational fishermen this is five pāua per person per day. The minimum legal size for caught pāua is 125 mm (4.9 in) for Haliotis iris and 80 mm (3 1/4 in) for Haliotis australis, measured in a straight line at the greatest length of the shell. The exception is Haliotis iris taken from the Amateur Taranaki Paua Fishery Area, which is the area of Taranaki coast bounded by the Awakino River in the north and the Whanganui River in the south, in which the minimum legal size is 85 mm (3 1/4 in). However, pāua caught in this area cannot be taken east of State Highway 4 unless they meet the 125 mm (4.9 in) limit.

In addition, no single person may have in their possession at any time (including on land) more than twenty pāua or more than 2.5 kg (5 1/2 lb) of shucked (shell removed) pāua. Pāua can only be caught by free diving: it is illegal to dive for pāua using scuba equipment. All pāua must remain unshucked until they are on the land side of the high tide mark so that Ministry for Primary Industries (MPI) fishery officers can inspect them if required.

There is an extensive global black market in the collection and export of abalone meat. Pāua poaching is a major industry in New Zealand with many thousands being taken illegally, often undersized. The right to harvest pāua can be granted legally under Māori customary rights, but since permits to harvest are abused, it is difficult to police. The limit is strictly enforced by roving MPI fishery officers with the backing of police. Fishery officers can issue infringement notices of between $250 and $500 for minor offences, such as having one or two more pāua than permitted. More serious offences have resulted in hefty court convictions, including seizure of diving gear, boats, and motor vehicles as well as large fines and in rare cases, imprisonment.

== Human use ==
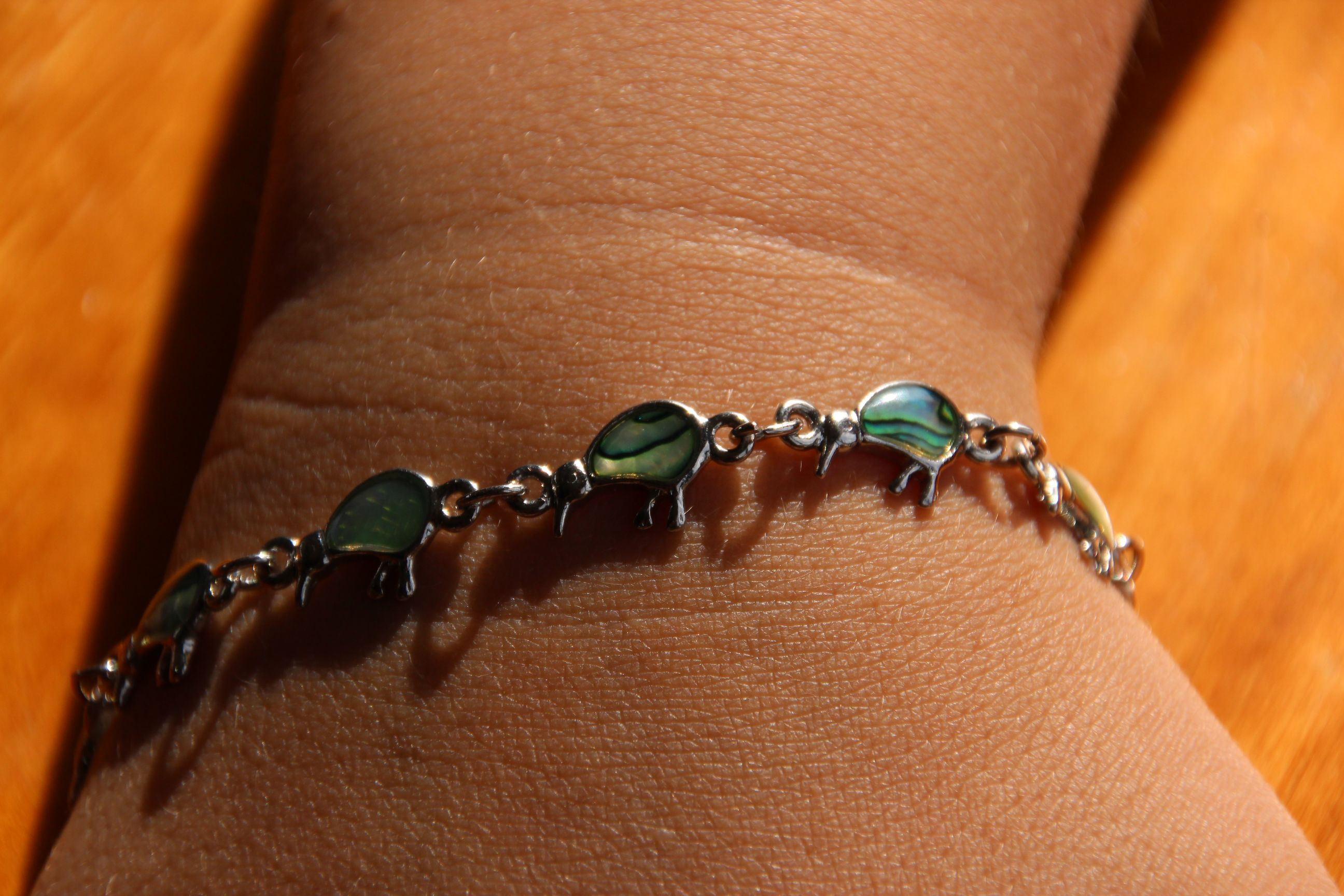
A pāua-shell bracelet

To Māori, pāua are recognised taonga, or a treasure, esteemed both as kaimoana (seafood) and as a valued resource for traditional and contemporary arts and crafts. Pāua were often harvested by diving. Two traditional methods for collecting pāua included using a specialised flat tool called a māripi to pry pāua off the sea floor, or by placing an Astrostole scabra (seven-armed starfish), a major predator of pāua, atop the shell. Pāua could be eaten raw, smoked, cooked in a hāngī, or preserved. Preserved pāua were often kept for winter months, or used as items to trade with inland iwi.

Pāua shells are frequently used to represent eyes of human and animal figures in Māori carvings, and used as decorations on cloaks and in earrings. Pāua is traditionally associated with the stars or whetū, the symbolic eyes of ancestors that gaze down from the night sky.

Pāua has historically been used by Māori to make fishing lures, with fish being attracted to flashes of light bouncing off the surface of the pāua shell.

During the colonial era of New Zealand, British settlers detested the taste of pāua, but had an appreciation for the shells. Pāua shells were highly requested items on the second voyage of James Cook, and were highly sought after by 19th century British jewellers. Eventually pāua became a part of the European New Zealander diet, first often appearing in soups and chowders. An international market for pāua meat began in the 1970s, after which pāua numbers dropped in the wild.

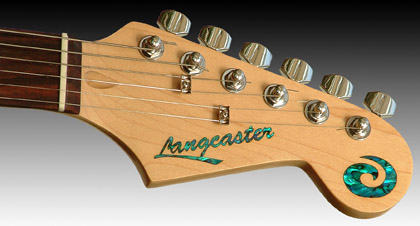
Pāua shell inlay in a Langcaster guitar head

Whole shells were commonly used as ashtrays through the 20th century, and highly polished New Zealand pāua shells are popular as pieces of modern jewellery, with their striking blue, green, and purple iridescence. Pāua shell is also used as an inlay in a manner similar to mother of pearl.

== Aquaculture ==
=== Background ===
Pāua aquaculture is a growing industry in New Zealand. The industry was started in New Zealand in the 1980s, and to date there are fourteen pāua farms operating throughout New Zealand, from Whangārei to Stewart Island. The first farms consisted of small-scale backyard and shed farms in which techniques and processes that grew good-quality pāua were developed; these are now being used on a commercial scale in large pāua farms. These farms produce pāua for their meat and shells, and some include the production of blue pearls. Most of the production from these farms is exported to the US and Asian markets.

There is high demand on the worldwide market, as decline in wild stocks due to overfishing and poaching means that the global market for abalone is greatly undersupplied. In 2023 the New Zealand pāua export industry was estimated by Fisheries New Zealand to be worth $55 million per annum.

=== Meat and shells ===
Most pāua farms grow pāua produced from wild broodstock; however, some have developed their own hatcheries and selective breeding programs to produce faster-growing species. The pāua are grown to market size (depending on conditions, this usually takes 2–3 years) in either long trays with inflow of seawater at one end and outflow at the other, or smaller tanks with tipper buckets that regularly dump seawater into the tanks to recreate the wave motion that pāua experience in the wild.

A number of different feeds are used throughout the pāua's life-cycle. Pāua hatch as trochophore larvae and feed on plankton present in seawater pumped into the holding tanks. When the larvae are ready to settle (usually 7 days at 16 °C; 61 °F), they are moved to settlement tanks that consist of many glass plates with small films of diatoms present (usually Navicula minimata). The diatoms are the main food source for the juveniles until they reach about 3 cm (1.2 in) in length; the diet is then switched to a macroalgae species. Several species have been used, including Lessonia variegata, Pterocladia sp. and Ulva lactuca; however, research has shown that pāua will eat most seaweed species. The pāua are considered adults at around six cm (2.4 in) in size and are then fed on a meal-based diet until they are ready for processing and sale.

=== Pearls ===
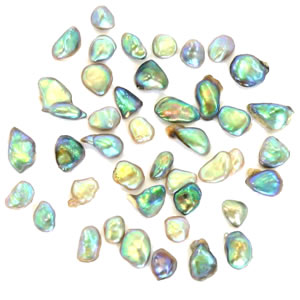
New Zealand abalone pearls

To produce pāua pearls, the pāua are harvested from the wild stocks (at the legal size of 12.5 cm (4.9 in)), and shell or plastic implants are either poked through the shell or fixed in place under the shell with glue. The shape of the insert dictates the shape of the final pearl. After the pāua are "nucleated", they are kept in tanks for two to three years and fed on either seaweed or meal, during which time they coat the insert with nacre. They are then harvested from the tanks, the meat is shucked, and the pearl is removed.

The quality and size of pearls changes depending on the size of the pāua. The pearls tend to be smaller when hatchery-reared pāua are used, which is why pāua from the wild are preferred. High stress levels within the farm can prevent the pāua from coating the insert to produce the pearl, so control of conditions to ensure that the pāua are not stressed is paramount.

== Climate change ==
Fisheries New Zealand report that climate change effects on pāua include more rapid larval development, but decreased adult size due to increasing ocean temperatures. Ocean acidification can cause reduced growth rates, and loss of habitat food sources, and also affect larval shell formation. Pāua harvests are also expected to be affected by increased severity and frequency of storms, which may also cause low salinity, causing mortality. Larval survival is also affected by coastal sedimentation, which also affects habitats and food sources.

== Popular culture ==
Pāua shells make up the decoration on Xena's first chakram in the hit TV series Xena: Warrior Princess. Although the show was set predominantly in ancient Greece, pāua shell was used because it is native to New Zealand, where the show was filmed.

== Gallery ==
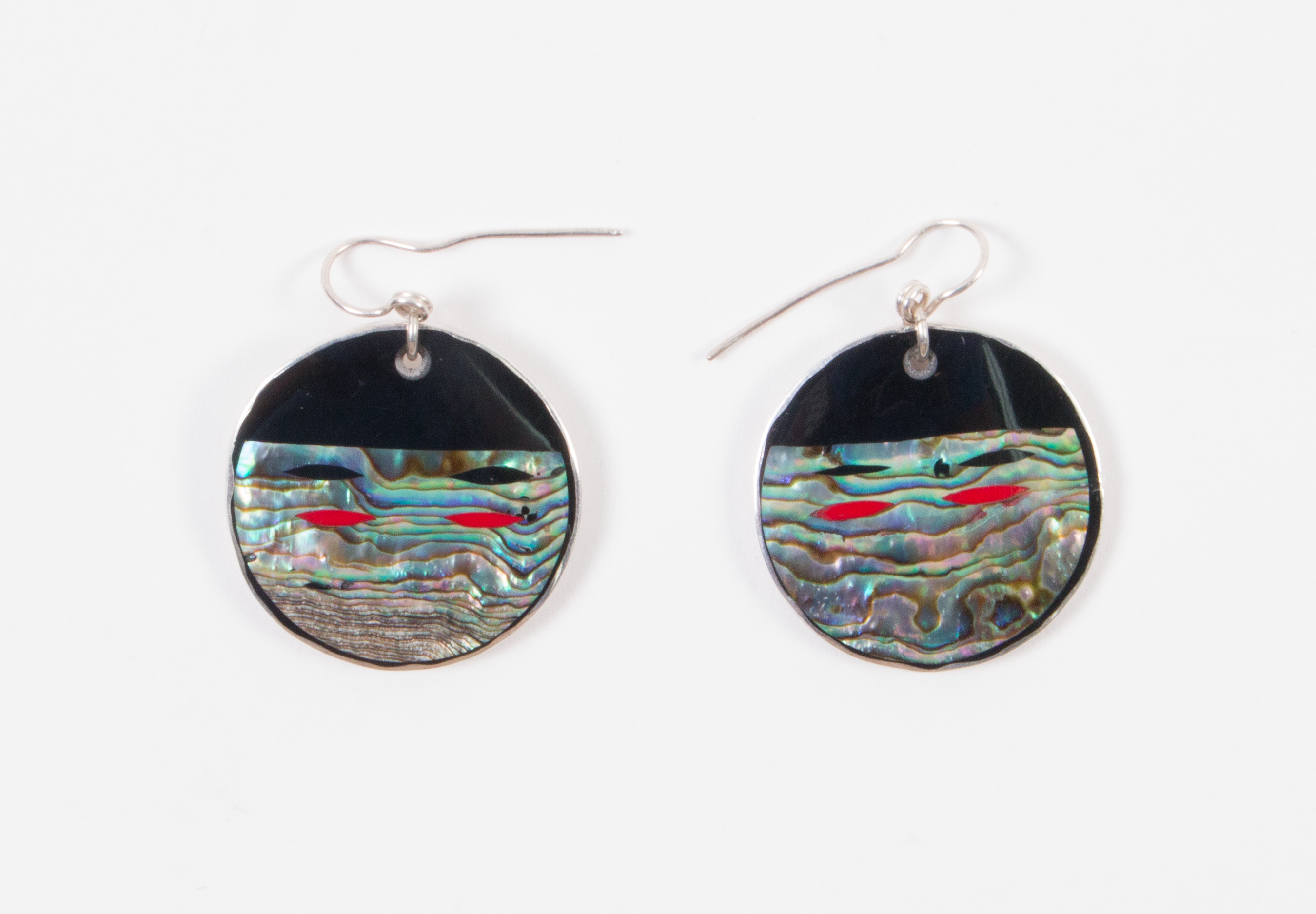
Pāua shell and resin earrings

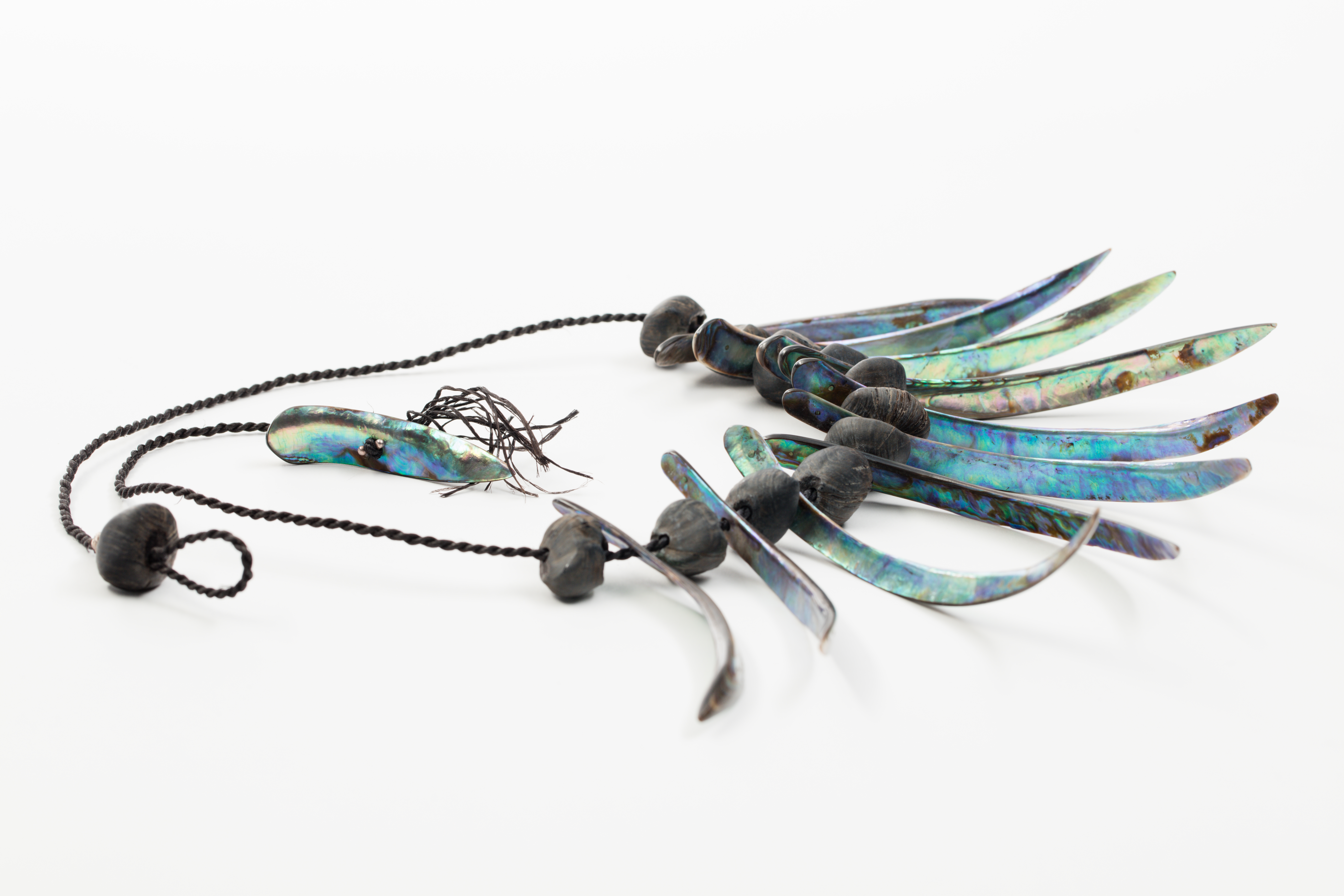
Pāua necklace by Alan Preston

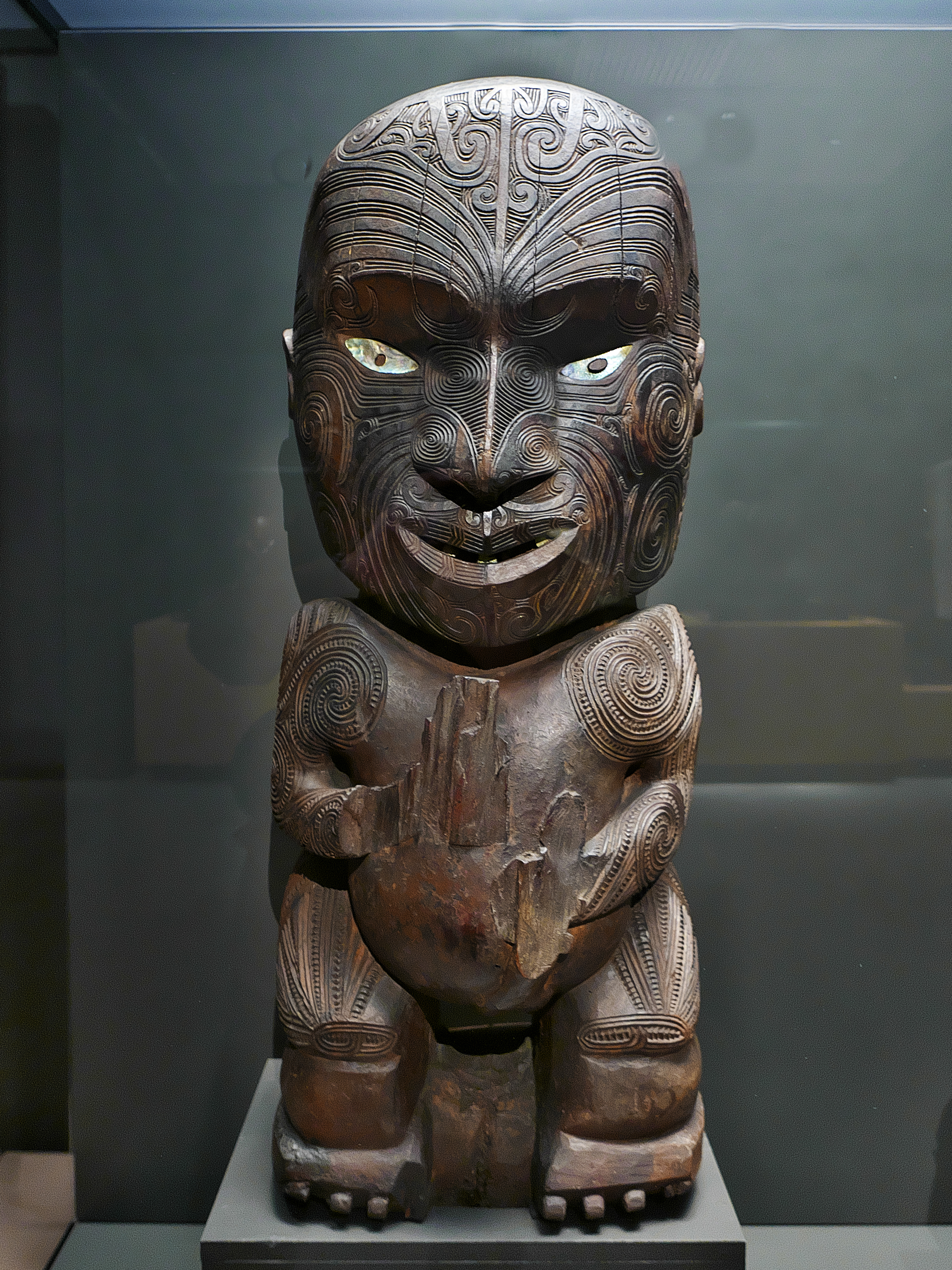
19th century Māori sculpture with pāua eyes

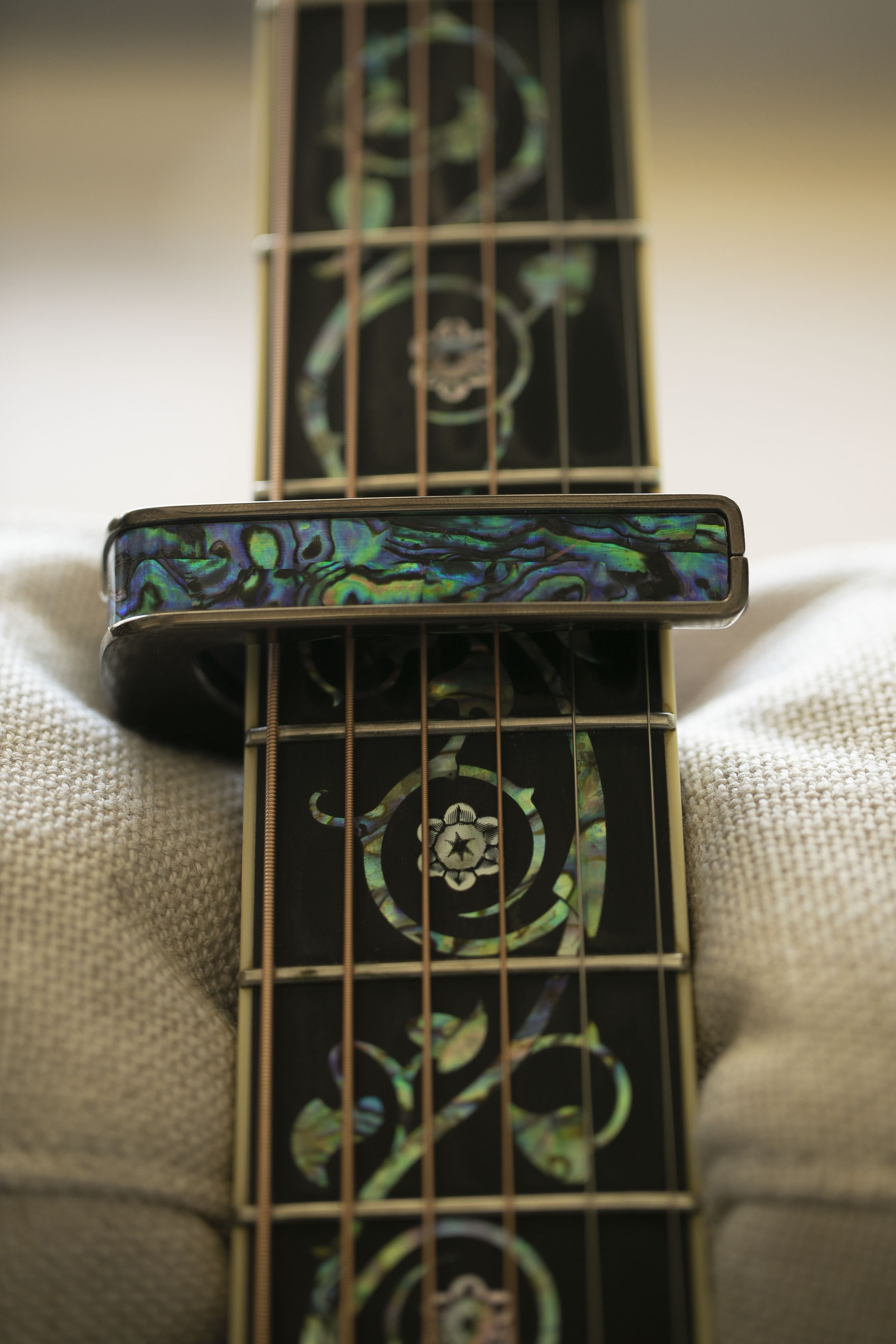
Shell inlay

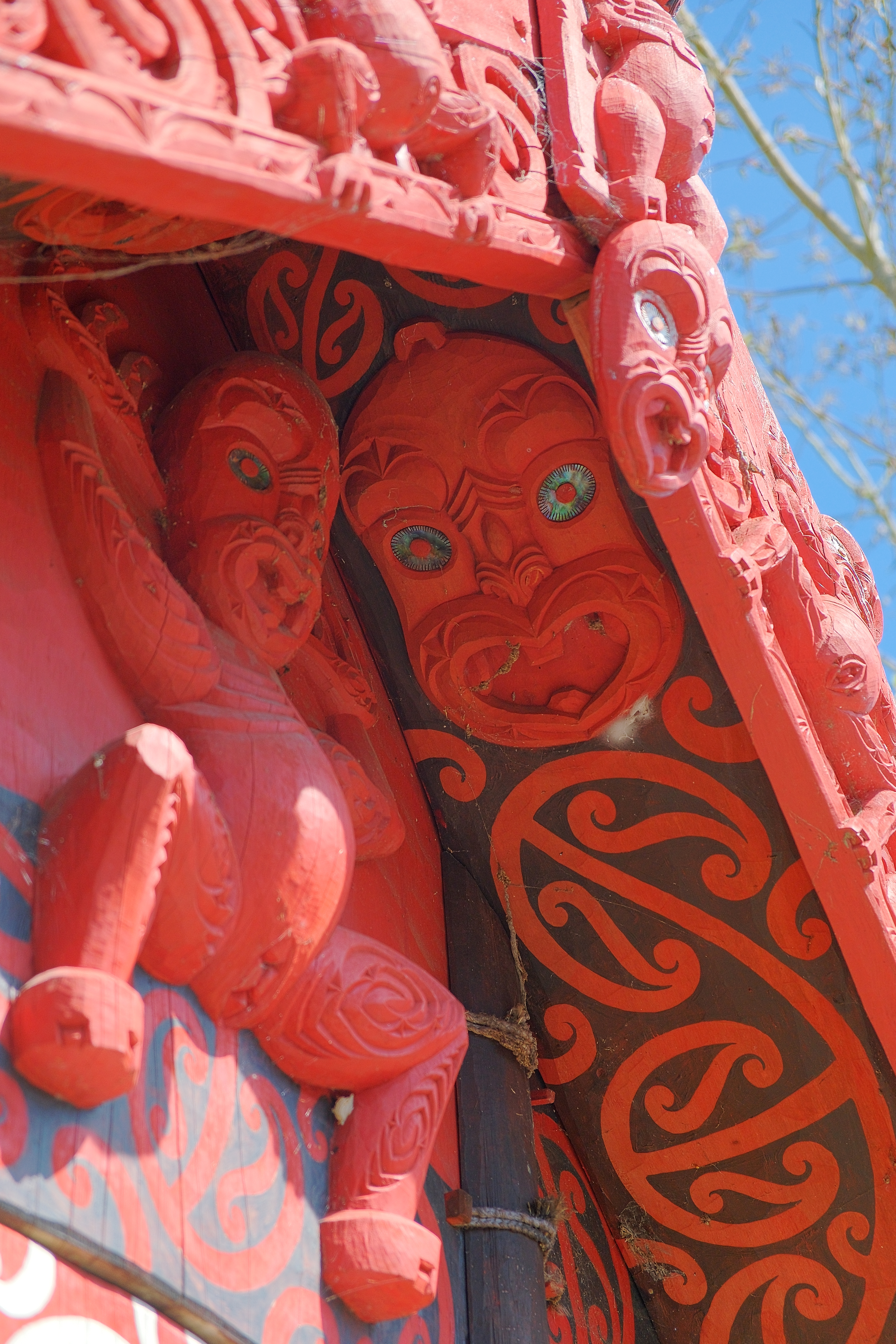
Carvings with Pāua inlay

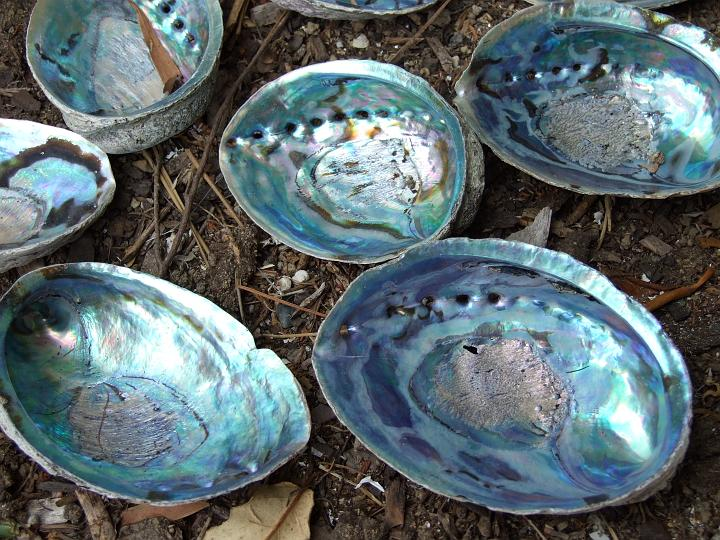
Blackfoot pāua shell.

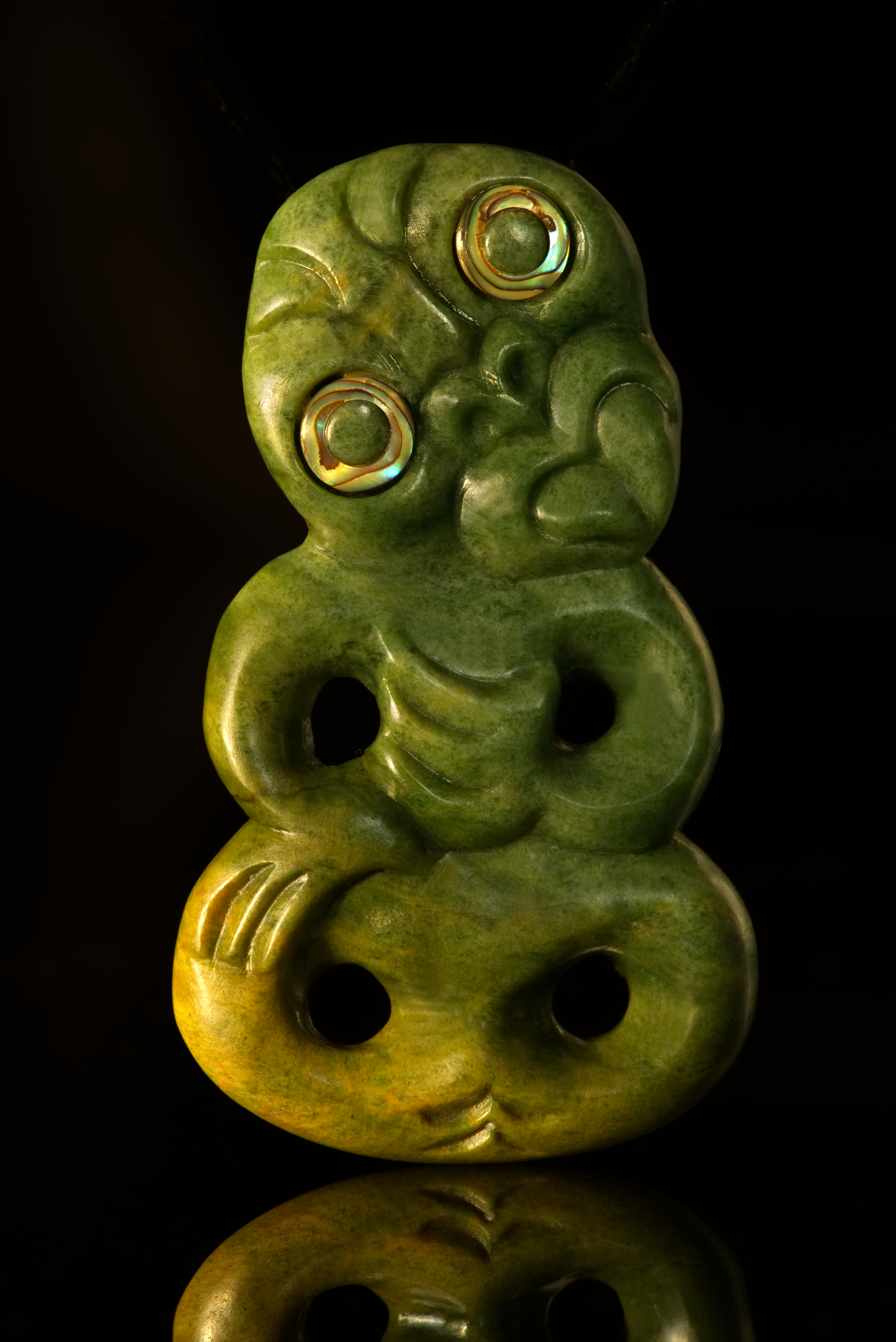
Hei-tiki with pāua eyes

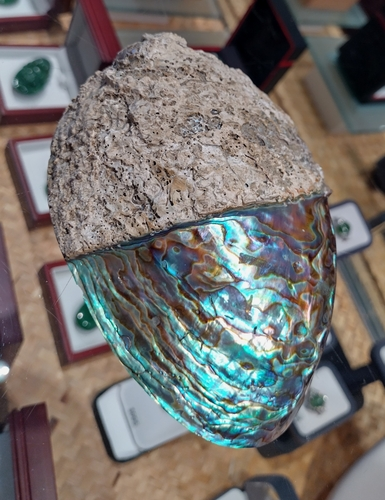
Half polished pāua shell, showing iridescent nacre underneath
