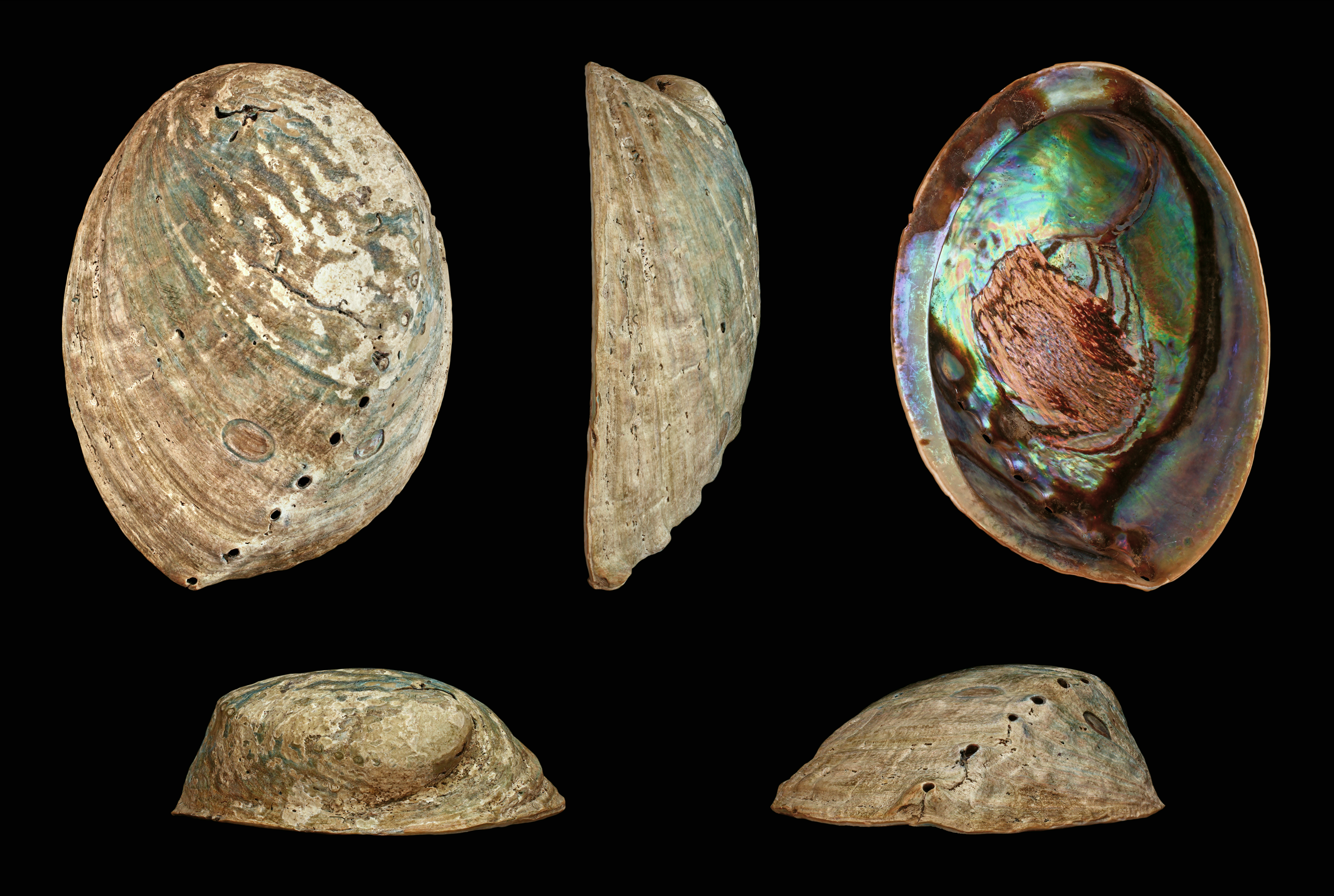
- A shell of Haliotis iris
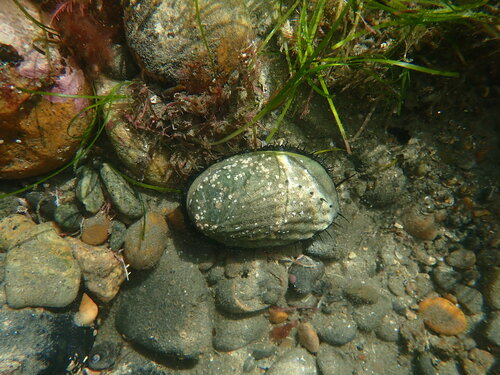
- Live Haliotis iris in Southland, New Zealand

Conservation status
- Least Concern (IUCN 3.1)

Scientific classification
- Kingdom: Animalia
- Phylum: Mollusca
- Class: Gastropoda
- Subclass: Vetigastropoda
- Order: Lepetellida
- Family: Haliotidae
- Genus: Haliotis
- Species: H. iris

Binomial name
- Haliotis iris Gmelin, 1791

Synonyms
- Haliotis (Paua) iris Gmelin, 1791

= Haliotis iris =

Species of gastropod

Haliotis iris, common name, blackfoot pāua, tuke o rangi, rainbow abalone or simply pāua is a species of edible marine gastropod mollusk in the family Haliotidae, the abalone.It is endemic to shallow waters on the coast of New Zealand. Widely consumed as a delicacy, its iridescent, nacreous shell is used for jewellery, decor and other handicrafts. Blackfoot pāua has cultural significance to both Māori and Pākehā and has become emblematic of New Zealand's cultural identity.

== Taxonomy ==
Haliotis iris was originally credited to Martyn, 1784 (Univ. Conch, ii, t. 61.) but his work was invalidated in 1957 by the ICZN, opinion 456.

== Distribution ==
This marine species is endemic to New Zealand. Blackfoot pāua is the largest abalone species found in New Zealand. It is most commonly found in shallow cool waters at depths less than 6 m (20 ft). The species occurs all around mainland New Zealand, Stewart Island, and the Chatham Islands. These sea snails often form large clusters in the sub-littoral zone on open, exposed coasts, where drift seaweed accumulates and there is good water movement. Blackfoot pāua grow to about 180 mm (7.1 in) in shell width.

== Description ==
Pāua belong to the molluscan genus Haliotis, more commonly known as abalone. The name Haliotis derives from Greek and means sea ear, reflecting the ear-like shape of the abalone shell. Three species of abalone occur naturally in New Zealand: blackfoot pāua (Haliotis iris), yellowfoot pāua (Haliotis australis), and whitefoot pāua (Haliotis virginea).

Haliotis iris moving over rocks

The size of the shell of this species varies between 80 and 170 mm (3.1 and 6.7 in). "The two sides of the oval, convex shell are equally curved. The oblique spire is very short and contains two whorls and five to seven perforations. The surface is pitted. The lip is continuous and is produced beyond the body whorl. The inner surface is dark metallic blue and green, with yellow reflections. The muscle impression is distinct and roughened. The back of the shell is convex and angled at the row of perforations. The outer surface is pale brown or light olive-green, pitted as if by the intersection of two series of low oblique folds. The inside of the spire is brilliantly pearly, prussian blue and green predominating, but with reflections also of purple, orange and a little red. The columellar plate is broad, passing into the expanded continuation of the outer lip above. It is not truncate below. Its face is flattened, and slopes inward. The cavity of the spire is small."

== Human use ==
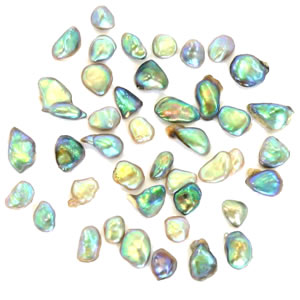
Pāua pearls

Because of its iridescent shell, Haliotis iris is often used for jewellery, arts and carvings around New Zealand, and is considered a national icon alongside the silver fern and kiwi. Haliotis iris is the only farmed species of pāua found in New Zealand. That is mainly because of its size compared to its smaller relatives—the "yellowfoot pāua" and the even smaller "virgin paua". Haliotis iris is consiered a delicacy and is widley consumed in New Zealand, as well as being exported abroad. Pāua are especially culturally significant to the Māori people as taonga (treasure), and their shells are used in many traditional crafts.

Historically, Māori utilised the shell of blackfoot pāua to make Pā kahawai (trolling lures) to catch fish. Fish would be attracted to the colour and light flashing off the reflective surface of the pāua shell.

Haliotis iris can produce gem quality pearls with the same colour and iridescence as their shell. Natural pāua pearls are rare and irregular shapes- most pāua pearls are cultured in a similar manner to pearls produced by oysters.

Blackfoot pāua shell items
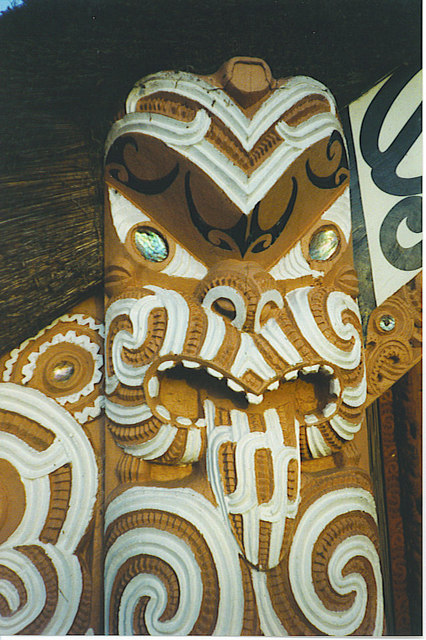
Maori carving with inlaid pāua shell eyes

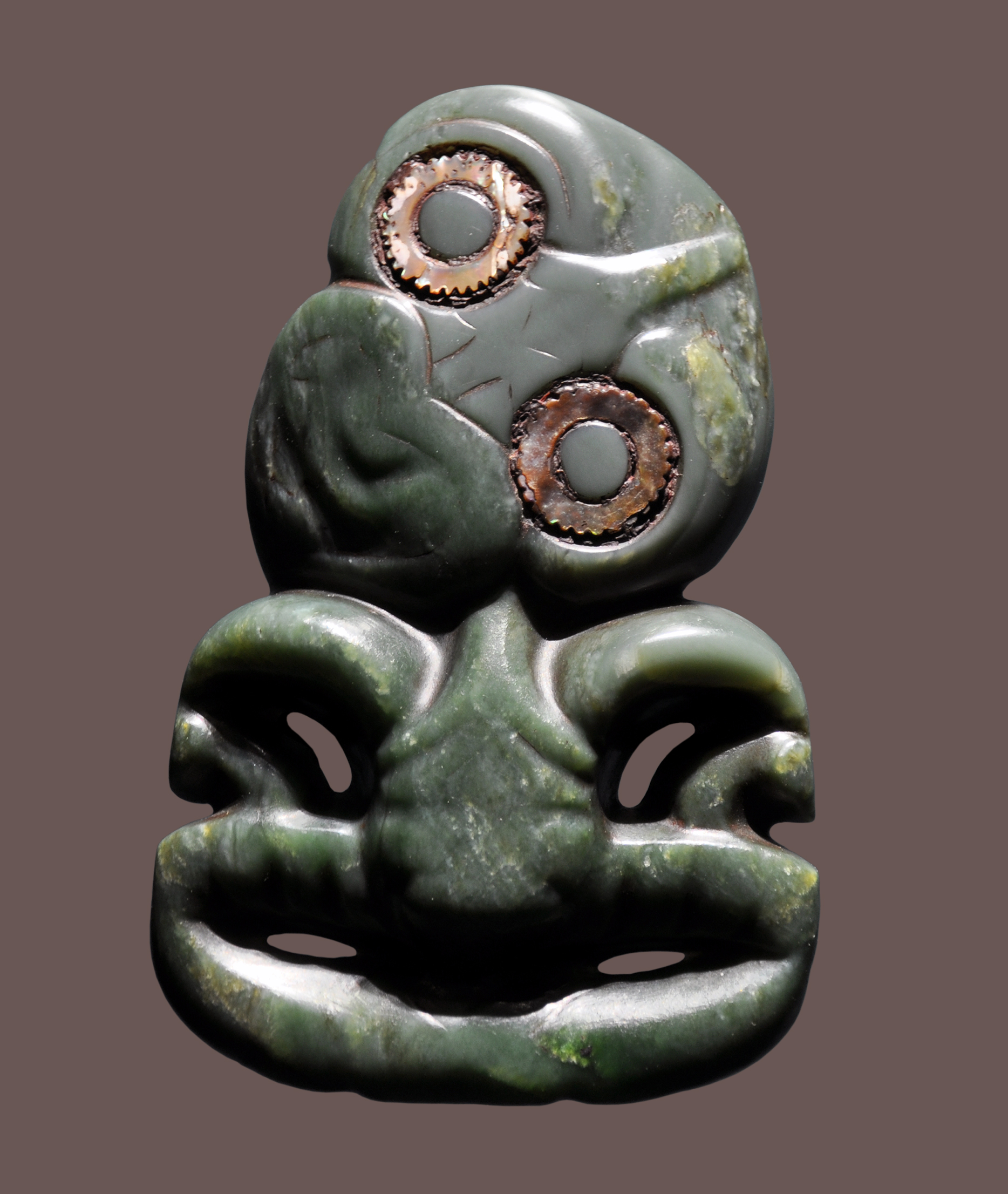
Traditional Māori Hei-tiki with pāua eyes

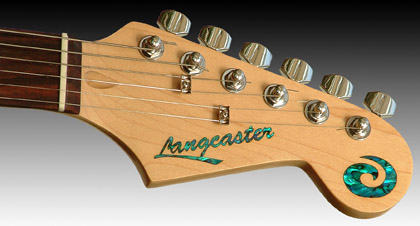
Pāua inlay on Langcaster guitar

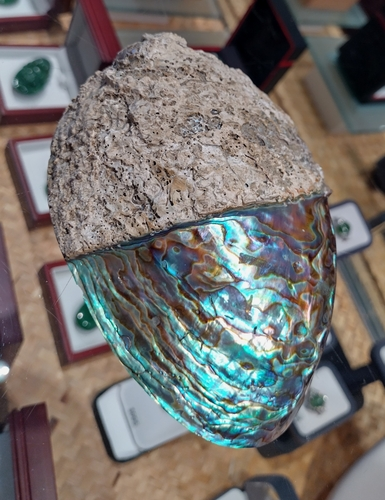
Half polished, half natural pāua shell

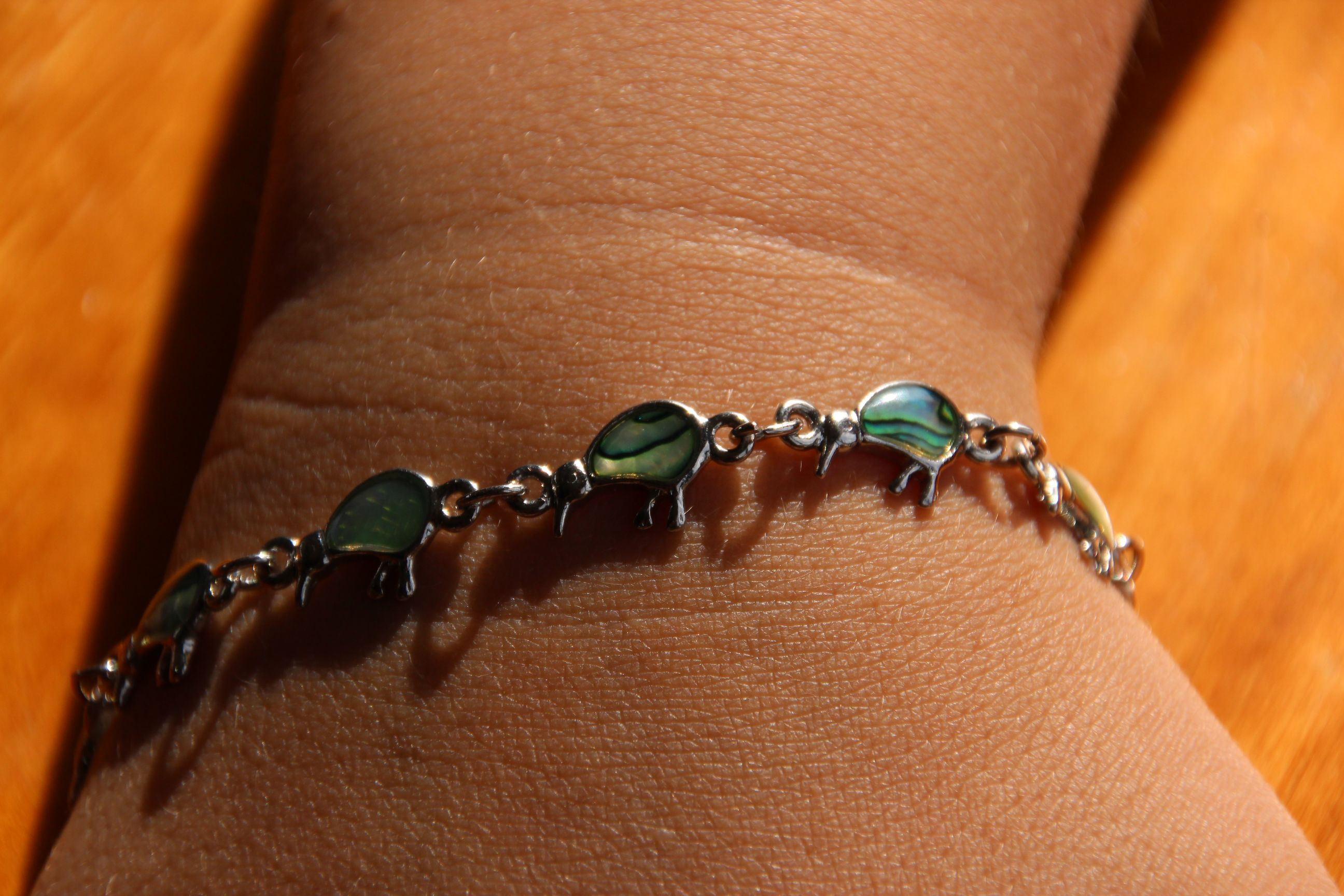
Pāua shell bracelet

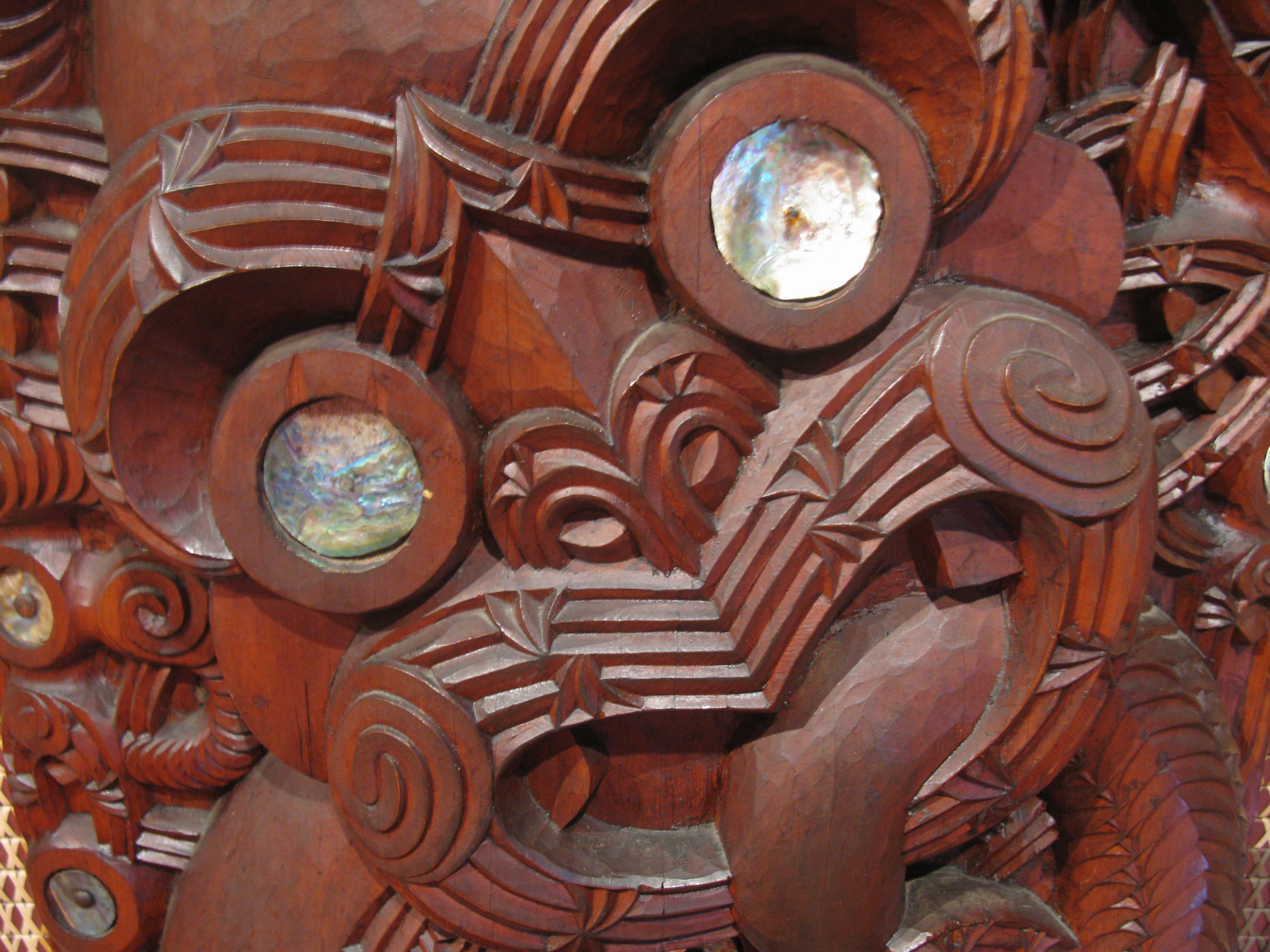
Māori carving with pāua

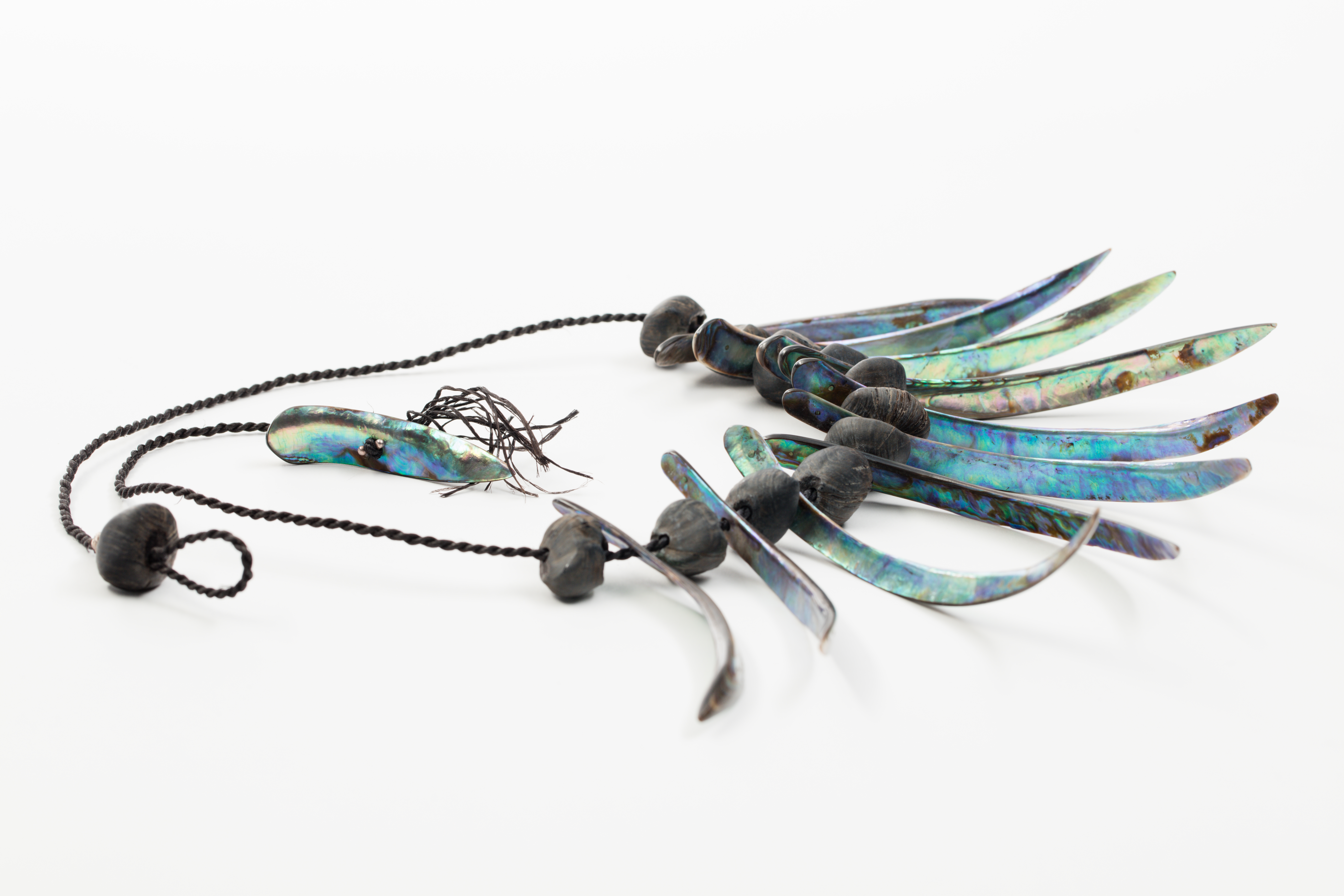
Pāua necklace by Alan Preston
