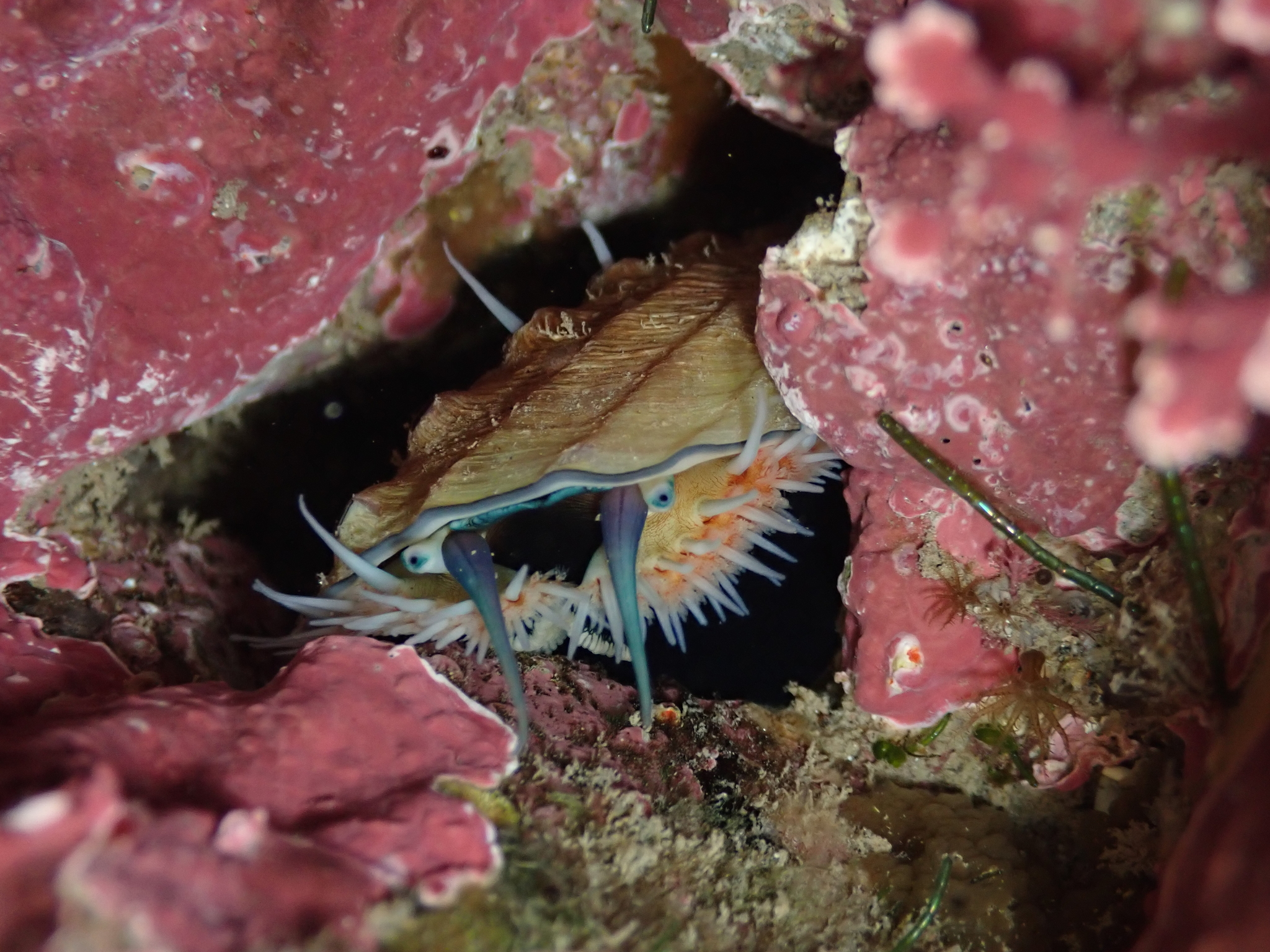
- Live Haliotis australis
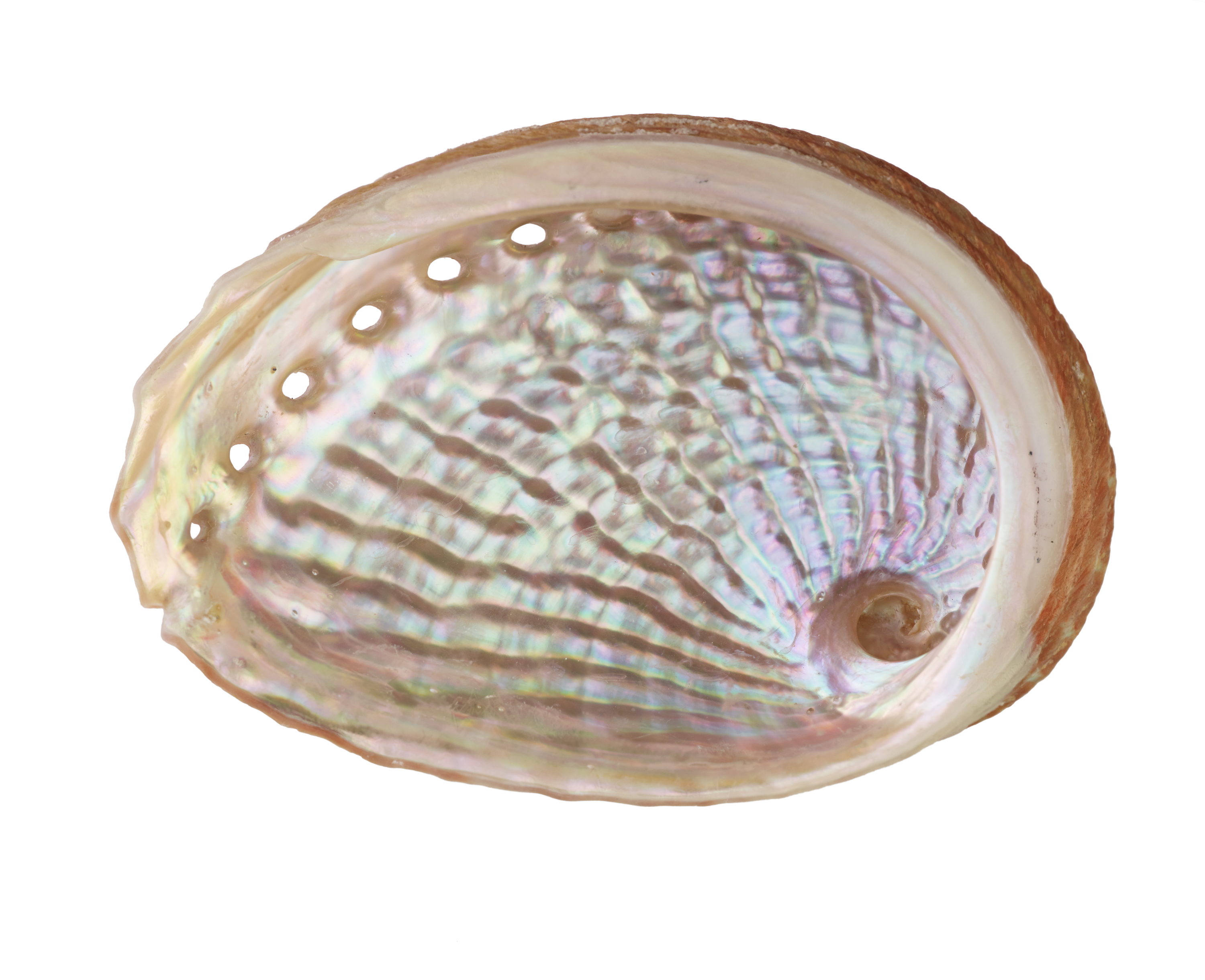
- Interior view of Haliotis australis shell

Conservation status
- Least Concern (IUCN 3.1)

Scientific classification
- Kingdom: Animalia
- Phylum: Mollusca
- Class: Gastropoda
- Subclass: Vetigastropoda
- Order: Lepetellida
- Family: Haliotidae
- Genus: Haliotis
- Species: H. australis

Binomial name
- Haliotis australis Gmelin, 1791

Synonyms
- Haliotis aleata Röding, 1798; Haliotis costata Swainson, 1822; Haliotis rugosoplicata Reeve, 1846; Haliotis (Padollus) australis Gmelin, 1791; Haliotis (Sulculus) australis Gmelin, 1791

= Haliotis australis =

Species of gastropod

Haliotis australis, known by the common names queen pāua, yellowfoot pāua, silver pāua, or austral abalone, is a species of marine gastropod mollusk found in Aotearoa-New Zealand. They are edible, and often fished recreationally. Like all pāua, they are of cultural significance to the Māori, who know it by a number of names including hauwai, hihiwa, karahiwa, karariwha and korohiwa. Yellowfoot paua are harvested commercially, although not to the same extent as the blackfoot abalone.

== Taxonomy ==
The queen pāua is a sea snail in the family Haliotidae, the abalones.

== Description ==
The size of the shell varies between 40 mm and 100 mm. "The thin, oval shell is quite convex. The distance of the apex from margin measures one-eighth to one-ninth the length of the shell. The sculpture consists of faint spirals and a close strong radiating corrugation. The 6 to 8 perforations are circular with elevated edges. The outlines are oval. The right margin is a little straighter. The back of the shell is convex, not carinated at the row of holes. The color pattern is light yellowish-brown, red on the spire, or light green flamed with red. The surface has almost obsolete spiral cords, and regular, close, radiating folds. Between the row of holes and the columellar margin there are no radiating folds, but several (generally three) strong spiral ribs. The spire is a little elevated and contains three whorls. Inside it is corrugated like the exterior, silvery with blue, green and red reflections, the latter predominating. The columellar plate is narrow.

The corrugated exterior is quite constant and characteristic. Young specimens are more strongly ribbed spirally, and often have radiating stripes of red on a delicate green ground."

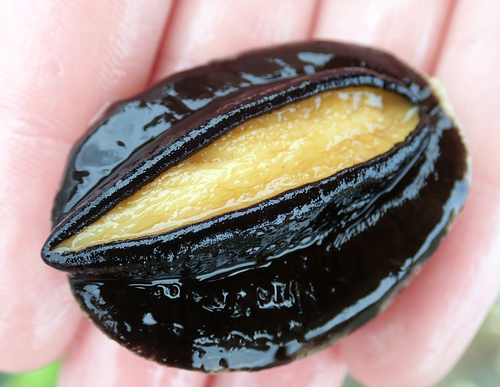
Underside of Haliotis australis, showing the yellow foot

As the common name suggests, the foot is yellow.

== Distribution and habitat ==
It is endemic and widely distributed across the coasts of New Zealand. They live in shallow waters less than 10 meters deep, and can form large groups in suitable conditions.

== Life history ==
Female queen pāua lay thousands of eggs that hatch into planktonic trochophore larva. After developing a shell, the larvae sink to the ocean floor. Juveniles that land in appropriate shallow reef ecosystems can continue developing into adults. Under good conditions, they can reach full size in under 4 years. Pāua can live for 20-30 years.

Predators include tube worms, (as juveniles), seven-armed starfish, and humans.

== Diet ==
Like other pāua, queen pāua are herbivorous. They graze on seaweeds and use their radula to scrape algae from rocks.

== Human use ==
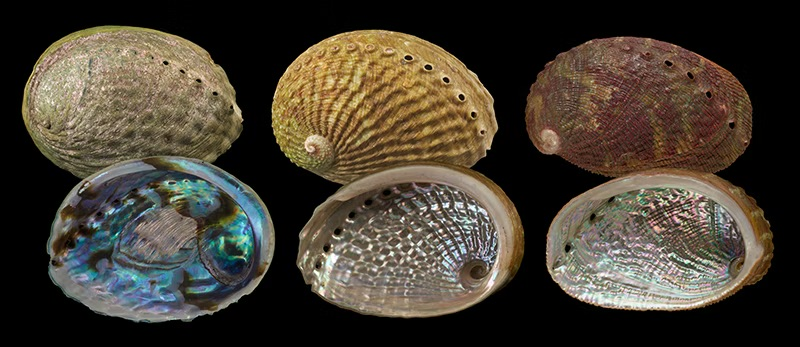
From left to right: Black-foot pāua (Haliotis iris), Yellow-foot pāua (Haliotis australis), virgin pāua (Haliotis virginea)

Haliotis australis (also known as 'Queenies') and other three Haliotis species are known as "pāua" in New Zealand and are used as a food source. While generally smaller than their Haliotis iris counterparts, they are still harvested but must be a minimum length of 80mm.

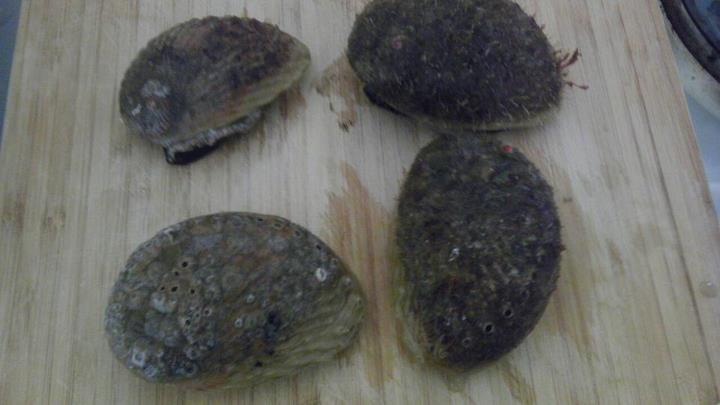
Freshly caught queen pāua (Abalone) from New Zealand's South Island
