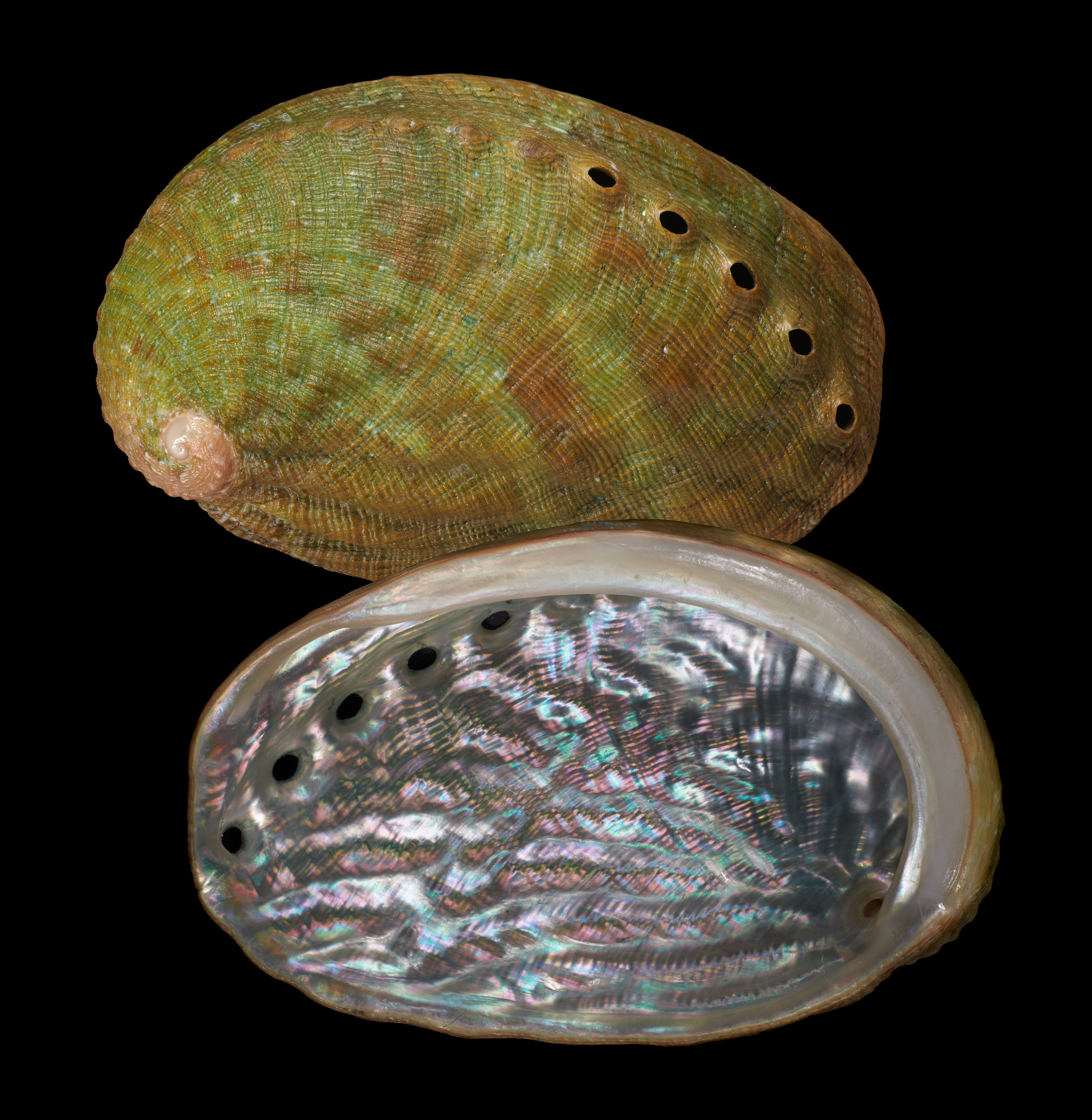
- Dorsal and ventral view of H. pirimoana shell

Scientific classification
- Kingdom: Animalia
- Phylum: Mollusca
- Class: Gastropoda
- Subclass: Vetigastropoda
- Order: Lepetellida
- Family: Haliotidae
- Genus: Haliotis
- Species: H. pirimoana

Binomial name
- Haliotis pirimoana Walton, 2024

= Haliotis pirimoana =

Species of sea snail

Haliotis pirimoana, also known as the Manawatāwhi pāua or the Three Kings abalone, is a species of edible sea snail, a marine gastropod mollusk in the family Haliotidae, the abalone.

== Description ==
The size of the shell for mature H. pirimoana varies between 30.1 mm and 37.1 mm in length, 20.2 mm and 24.3 mm in width and 6.6 mm and 8.7 mm in height. "Foot cream, with irregular, darker grey and/or green bands on exposed surfaces. Protoconch opaque white, surface rough, lacking strong sculpture, of approximately 0.7 whorls, 0.23 mm width, with a distinctive V-shaped notch indenting the suture just before protoconch/teleoconch boundary.

Shell ovoid, length up to 37.7 mm (31.3–37.7 mm), length/width ratio 1.49–1.56, with 5–7 open tremata. First half teleoconch whorl opaque white, second half whorl translucent, pale, with faint, similar, commarginal axial lamellae, their spacing increasing slightly with size; fine spiral riblets finer or absent nearer suture. Later whorls with numerous fine spiral threads (width to 0.24 mm) that multiply by intercalation; interspaces about as wide as threads, or slightly narrower; most threads of similar width, but every second or fourth thread usually slightly wider; radial sculpture comprising a series of broad, irregular, rounded, non-commarginal radial wrinkles, numerous fine and similar commarginal primary lamellae, and more numerous, much finer secondary lamellae (5–15 per primary lamella).

Dorsal colouration: apex pale pink; last adult whorl typically uniform light or dark green but some specimens predominantly red or golden, typically with broad, irregular red patches. Each 4th or 8th primary spiral cord in some specimens with regularly alternating brown and paler sectors; some specimens additionally with irregular chevron-shaped colour blotches, their spacing gradually increasing abapically, strongest adapically and near peripheral concavity. Interior brilliantly nacreous. Muscle scar poorly defined. Columella relatively tightly coiled."

== Distribution ==
H. pirimoana is endemic to the waters surrounding the Three Kings Islands (Manawatāwhi), New Zealand, and King Bank.

== Human use ==
Regulations are in place for the harvesting of "pāua" in the Auckland and Kermadec area wherein the entirety of the Three Kings Islands and therefore the locality of H. pirimoana can be found.
