= Langcaster Guitars =

New Zealand based guitar brand

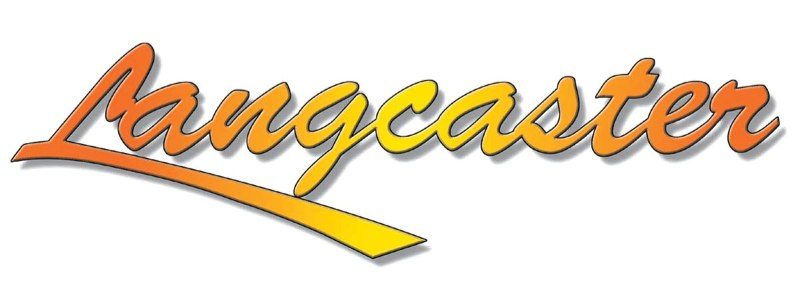
- Type: Private
- Industry: Musical Instruments
- Founded: 2000
- Founder: Joh Lang
- Headquarters: Auckland, New Zealand
- Area served: Global
- Key people: Joh Lang, Danny Lang
- Website: www.langcaster.com

Langcaster Guitars is a New Zealand guitar brand founded by Dutchman Joh Lang.

The Langcaster Guitar is distinctive for its unique prehistoric swamp kauri body and intricate patterns made from the roots of the native New Zealand Kauri tree. Carbon dating carried out by the scientists at the University of Waikato in New Zealand and the University of Groningen in the Netherlands has found wood used in the guitar bodies to be more than 35,000 years old. Notable players of Langcaster Guitars include Jan Akkerman, Kara Gordon, and Arli Liberman.

== History ==
The first Langcaster guitar was handmade and crafted in 2000 by Amsterdam-born inventor and luthier Joh Lang. These guitars were further developed by Lang and his son in his home in West Auckland suburb, Titirangi in New Zealand on the fringes of the Waitākere Ranges native kauri forest.

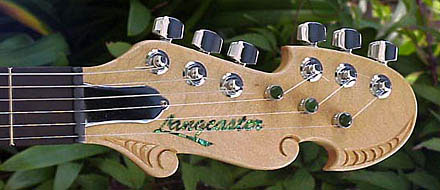
Langcaster Headstock

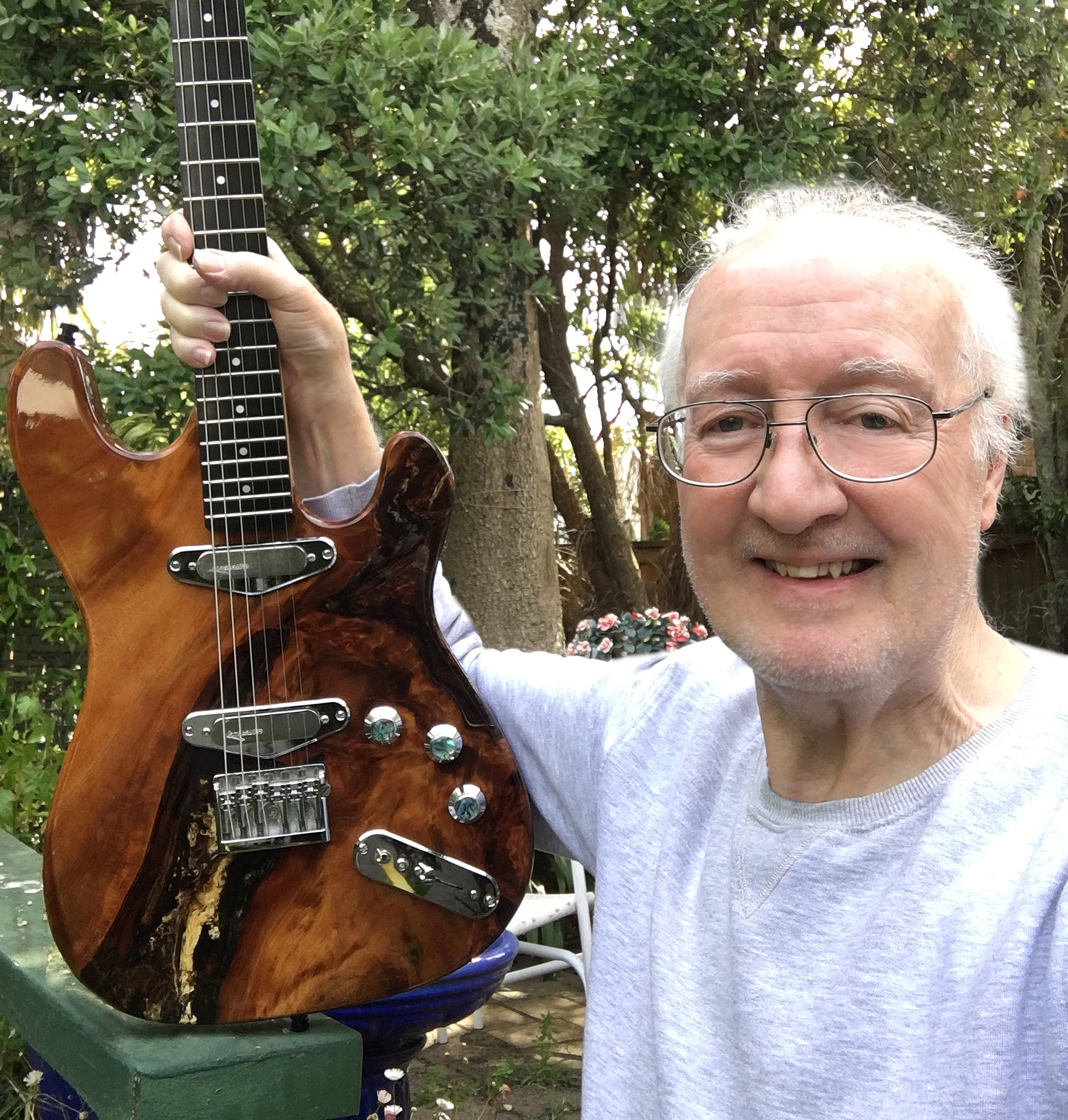
Joh Lang maker of Langcaster guitars and Langcaster Pickups

== Material ==
The Langcaster guitar is made from 35000 year old swamp kauri which can only be found in New Zealand. It is an exclusive wood to the New Zealand Government and the export of this raw material is forbidden and only allows the exportation of readymade Swamp Kauri goods. Because of its high density this wood is well suited for the construction of these guitars. The cracks between the roots are filled with clear epoxy.

== Guitar shape ==
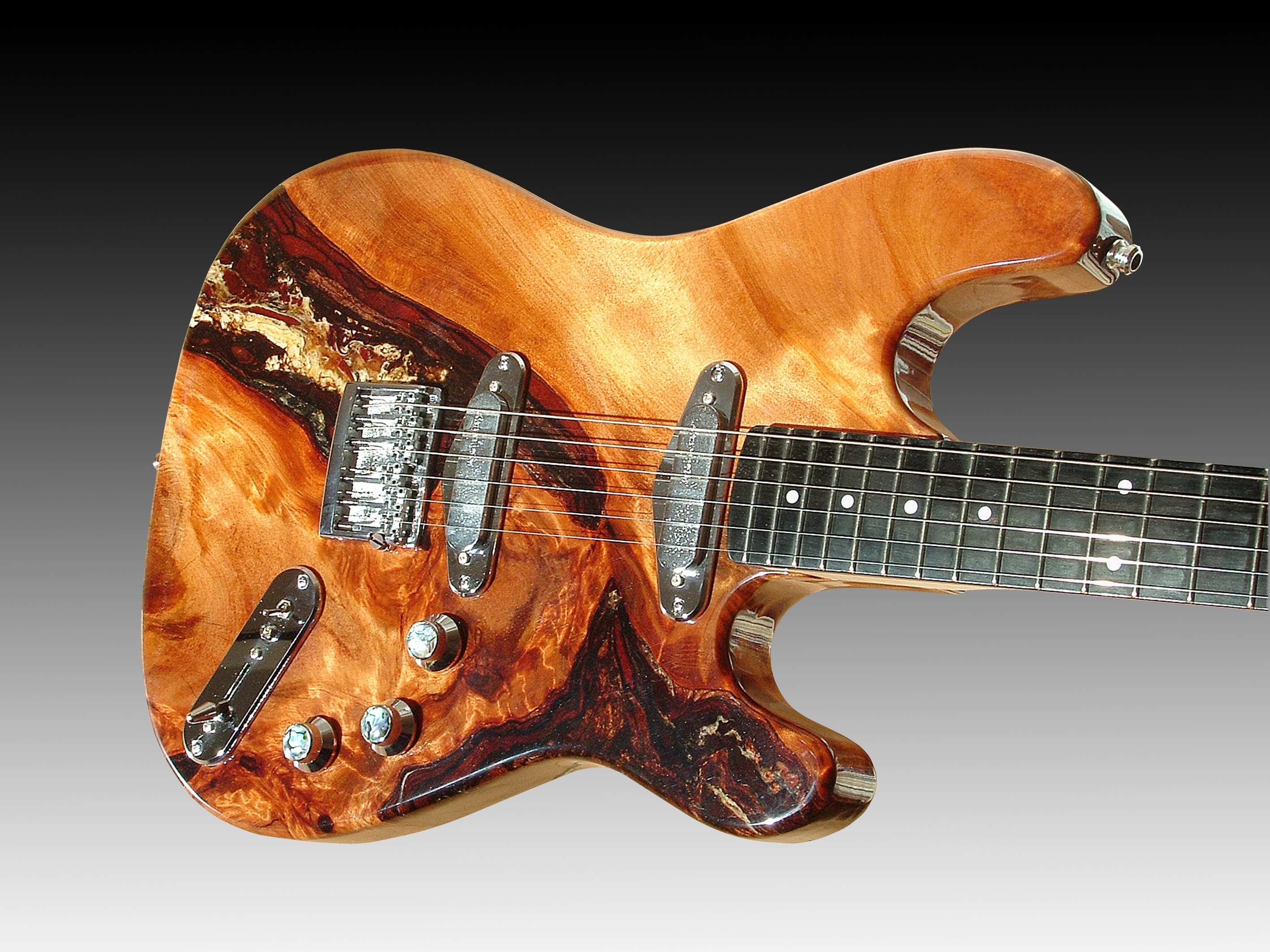
The Kauri Stratocaster shape

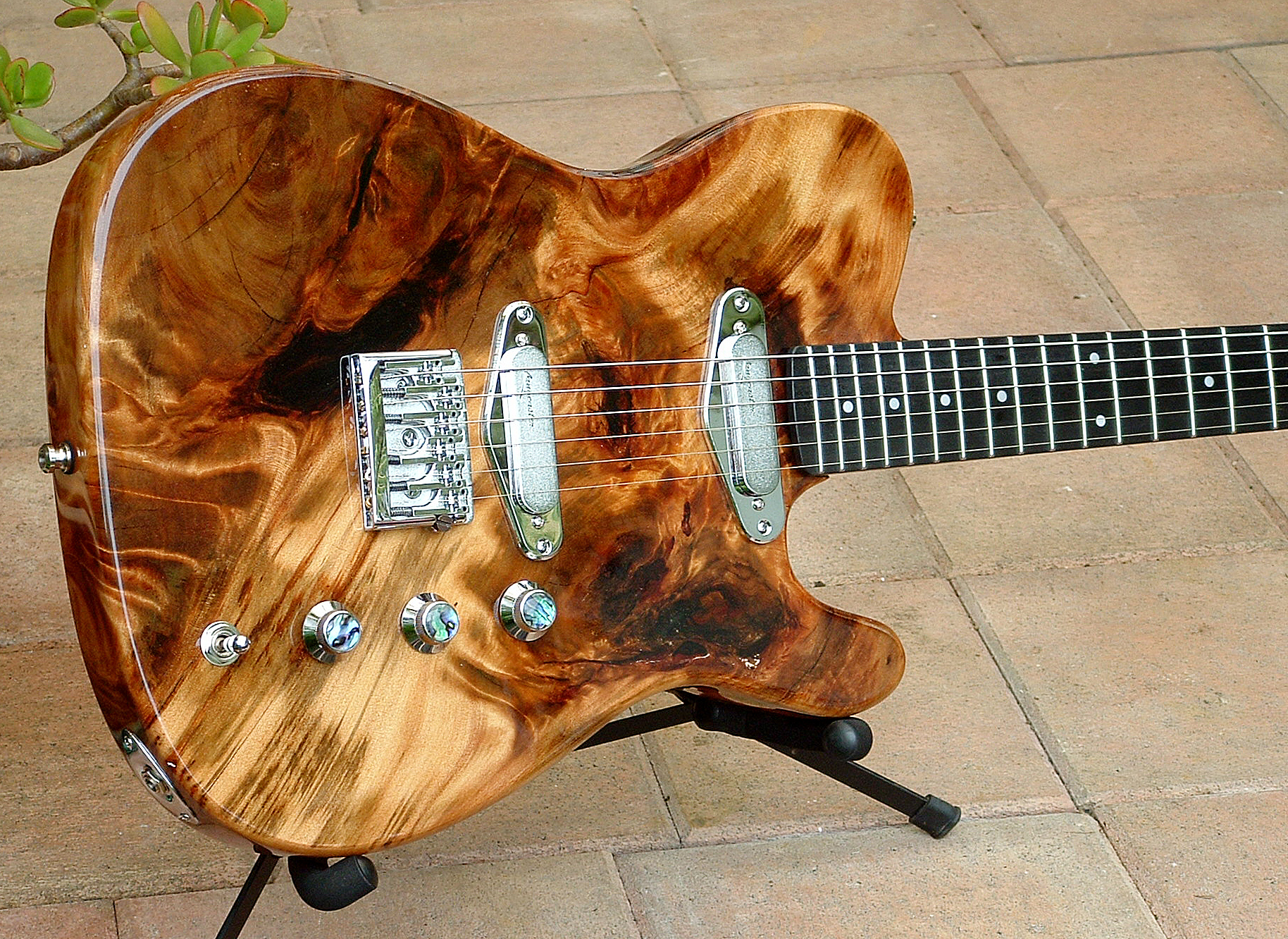
The Kauri Telecaster shape

The Langcaster guitars were primarily a Stratocaster body shape until in 2006 when Lang introduced the limited edition Cobra guitar, which had a Telecaster shape. This guitar was named after the sculptured cobra snake in the lower bout of the body, crowned with a diamond-like eye. This model was also equipped with the lo-impedance pickups and electronics with an added LED in the switch plate showing the picking force when the overdrive is activated.

In 2010, Lang released 25 of the limited edition anniversary model guitars to celebrate 10 years in the making of the Langcaster. Following this series Lang went on to produce 50 uniquely koru designed kauri guitars.

== Innovations ==
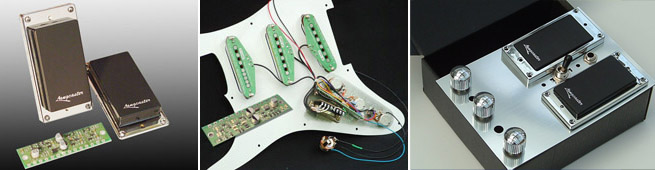
Langcaster Pickups

The notable feature of the Langcaster guitar is the application of the low impedance Ultimate Lo Pickups which are an impedance of 100 Ohm. The Ultimate Lo Pickups are made by two stacked coils and winding techniques, mounted onto a PCB in a single coil humbucker or Strat pickup cover housing. The pickups have eight magnetic poles to avoid dead spots when bending the thin strings and have an overdrive option with a gain control pot and do not hum.

Lang founded a pickup with all the advantages of a low impedance pickup, being higher fidelity and low noise. However, the output of The Ultimate Lo pickups was that high that a separate buffer amp was needed. Lang used this occasion to develop a small PC board with a buffer amp and an integrated tube sounding overdrive sound, which he called the Ultradrive. All Langcaster guitars are equipped with these pickups and corresponding battery powered circuitry, incorporating clean overdrive switch and an overdrive intensity control pot.

== Design ==
The latest series of the Langcaster guitar features a koru pāua inlay at the head of the guitar which is a Māori symbol for new live and strength.

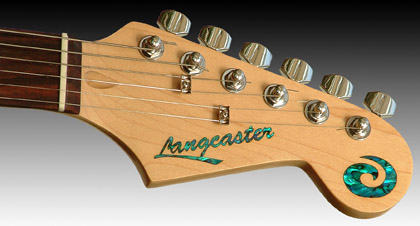
Koru Paua Headstock

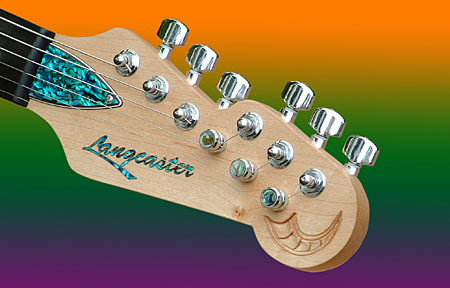
Anniversary Headstock

== Notable players ==
- Jan Akkerman - Netherlands
- Arli Liberman- Israel
- Kara Gordon - New Zealand
