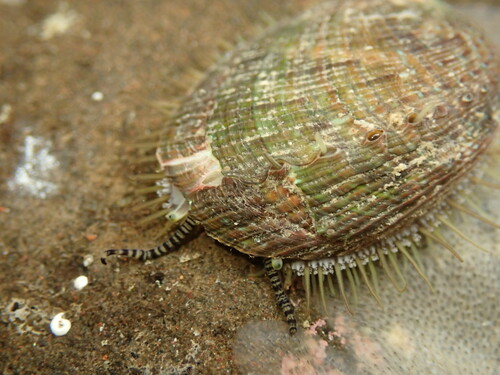
- Live virgin pāua at Southland

Conservation status
- Least Concern (IUCN 3.1)

Scientific classification
- Kingdom: Animalia
- Phylum: Mollusca
- Class: Gastropoda
- Subclass: Vetigastropoda
- Order: Lepetellida
- Family: Haliotidae
- Genus: Haliotis
- Species: H. virginea

Binomial name
- Haliotis virginea Gmelin, 1791

Synonyms
- Haliotis marmorata Linnaeus, 1758; Haliotis (Haliotis) gibba Philippi, R.A., 1846; Haliotis (Haliotis) marmorata Reeve, L.A., 1846 (junior homonym); Haliotis (Haliotis) subvirginea Weinkauff, H.C., 1883; Haliotis virginea virginea Gmelin, 1791 · accepted, alternate representation; Haliotis (Paua) virginea Gmelin, 1791

= Haliotis virginea =

Species of gastropod

Haliotis virginea, common name virgin pāua, white-foot pāua, koio, or marapeka is a species of edible sea snail, a marine gastropod mollusk in the family Haliotidae, the abalone. It is endemic to New Zealand. Haliotis virginea is one of several New Zealand Haliotis species referred to as pāua, species valued for their meat, shell, and cultural significance.

== Description ==
The size of the shell varies between 30 mm and 75 mm. Like all pāua, the shell of Haliotis virginea has a reflective nacreous interior.

== Distribution and habitat ==
The white-foot pāua is the least common but most widely distributed of the three commonly harvested species of New Zealand pāua. It is found on coastine on both the North and South islands, as well as the Antipodes Islands and Chatham Islands.

== Subspecies ==
A number of subspecies of Haliotis virginea are recognised:

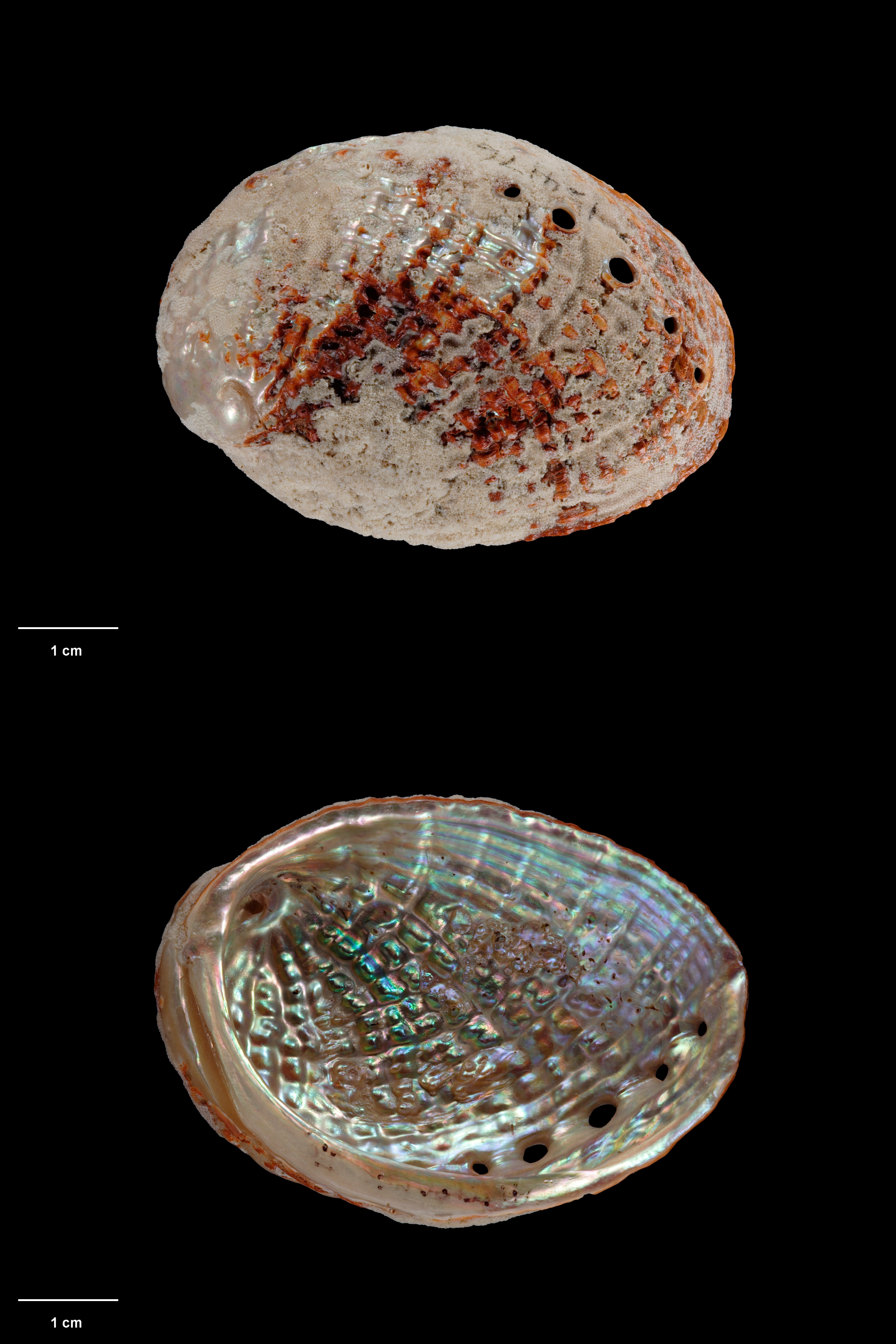
Antipodes pāua (Haliotis virginea stewartae) holotype

- Haliotis virginea crispata Gould, 1847
- Haliotis virginea huttoni Filhol, 1880
- Haliotis virginea morioria Powell, 1938
- Antipodes pāua, Haliotis virginea stewartae Jones & Owen, 2004

DNA extracted from H. virginae shells in museums showed three main population divisions, inhabiting the Three Kings Islands; the Chatham, Auckland, and Antipodes Islands; and mainland New Zealand (as well as Campbell Island). These three clades do not correspond to the subspecies recognised above.

== Human use ==
Haliotis virginea and three other Haliotis species are known as "pāua" in New Zealand and are a restricted food source.
