= Aquaculture in the United Kingdom =

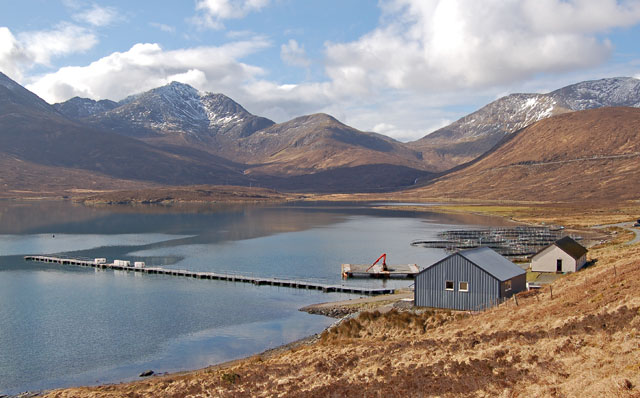
- Cairidh Salmon Farm jetty in Scotland

Harvest Aquaculture in the United Kingdom (2017)
- Aquaculture inland: 32,000 tonnes (35,000 tons) (Note: This figure have been rounded to the nearest thousand and is estimated by average annual figures)
- Aquaculture marine: 190,000 tonnes (210,000 tons)
- Aquaculture total: 222,434 tonnes (245,192 tons)

Aquaculture in the United Kingdom is dominated by salmon farming (mostly in Scotland), then by mussel production with trout being the third most important enterprise. Aquaculture in the United Kingdom (Note: This is defined as the four countries of England, Northern Ireland, Scotland and Wales (listed alphabetically) and does not apply to any Crown Dependencies of the United Kingdom (IE the Isle of Man, and the Channel Islands) which are in the immediate waters surrounding the United Kingdom, but also excludes any overseas dependencies (IE the Falkland Islands etc).) represents a significant business for the UK, producing over 200,000 tonnes (220,000 tons) of fish whilst earning over £700 million in 2012 (€793 million). (Note: Values given are for 2012.)

UK aquaculture applies to three main strands of species; finfish (salmon, trout, carp etc.), shellfish (mussels, oysters, lobster etc.) and marine algae (seaweed). These are rated in the tonnage that is produced annually. Aquaponics involves the symbiotic relationship of fish farming with growing plants in water (a process whereby the plants clean the dirty water from the fish tank). As such, aquaponics is not included in this article. A fourth strand is ornamental (coldwater fish, tropical fish and aquatic plants), but this is in very small volumes by weight.

Scottish finfish aquaculture is rated third in the world behind Norway and Chile in terms of tonnage of production, and is the United Kingdom's most valuable food export. Aquaculture is also increasingly being used to help conserve rare species where breeding grounds have been destroyed or other environmental factors have affected reproductive patterns.

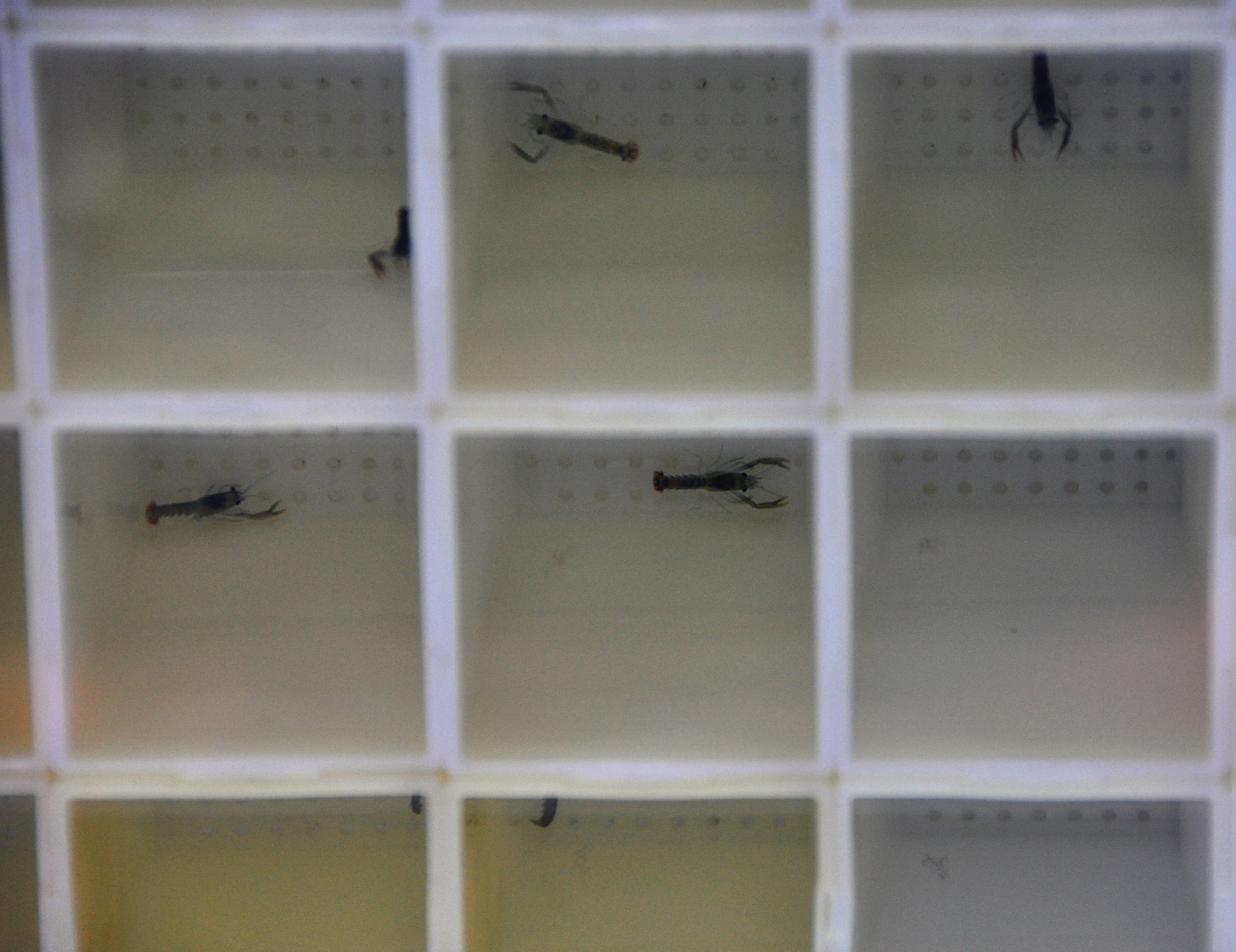
Juvenile lobsters, National Lobster Hatchery

== Overview ==
Historically in the United Kingdom, as in other European nations, the keeping of fish in ponds for use as food dates back centuries, possibly as far as the 13th century. A fish pond was a way of keeping a steady supply of food through the winter, and most medieval and monastic houses and castles had a fish pond stocked with carp, pike and bream. Some were vastly under-utilised and the efforts of keeping fish was to serve up only on special occasions, especially in monastic houses, when freshwater fish would be avoided at Lent. During the 19th century, as fresh sea fish could be brought from ports to inland locations by the railways, the stocking, breeding and farming of fresh fish declined, unlike eastern European nations where the carp is still a 'table fish'.

The aquaculture industry in the United Kingdom is dominated by the farming of Atlantic salmon (mariculture), which is concentrated in the shoreline waters around Scotland. Smaller aquaculture business include seaweed farming in Yorkshire and Cornwall and the shellfish industry in Wales. Salmon farming in Scotland started production in the early 1970s and the number of companies increased exponentially. Even though the number of farming sites have been increasing, the number of different companies has decreased; in 1995 62 companies operated 162 sites between them, by 2016, 254 sites were in operation overseen by just 16 companies. By 2019, only 12 businesses were in operation at what was described as "226 active sites". The tonnage of salmon production from Scotland in 2017 was 189,707 tonnes (209,116 tons), which makes Scotland the third largest producer behind Norway and Chile. However, concerns with the detrimental effects of fish farming on the fish themselves, the wild fish and the immediate environment that they habit and cohabit, has led to some criticism from wildlife groups and academics.

99% of finfish production is from Scotland, whilst 47% of shellfish production comes from England and Wales. The Centre for Environment, Fisheries and Aquaculture Science (CEFAS), has over 500 business registered in England and Wales for finfish aquaculture, though most of these are breeders of fish for ponds and indoor tanks. Producers can apply to become members of the BAP (Best Aquaculture Practice), which guarantees responsibility and certification for every step in the production chain.

The second largest aquaculture market in terms of tonnage is the shellfish market, mostly mussels, but also oysters and scallops. The abalone Haliotis tuberculata, known as green ormer in the UK, is increasing possible to be farmed in the coastal waters of the southern half of the United Kingdom due to global warming, and some trials have taken place on the south west coast. The ormer does not suffer the effects of pollutants, and more importantly, does not store toxins in its flesh unlike other bivalve creatures.

== Salmon ==
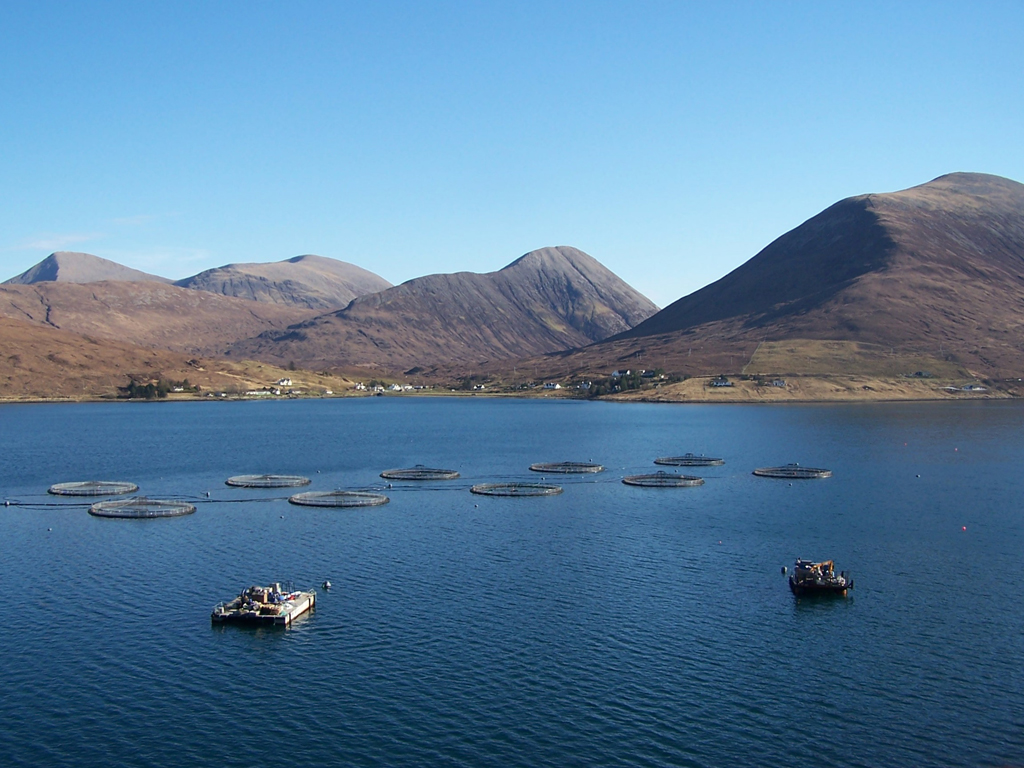
Loch Ainort fish farm

=== Scotland ===
Salmon farming on a commercial scale was started in Britain by a company called Marine Harvest, then a subsidiary company of Unilever. Marine Harvest had invested in two sites in the 1960s, a salmon and trout farm in Lochailort, and a flatfish and crustacean research centre in Findon, just outside Aberdeen. The first fish production from Lochailort was achieved in 1971, since then the industry has expanded and salmon and trout are farmed commercially in Scotland at sites in Argyll & Bute, Highland, Orkney, Shetland and the Western Isles.

In 2014, fish farming in Scotland led to a turnover in the country to the tune of £1 billion, and supported over 8,800 jobs. However, diseases, and parasites such as the sea louse, have had a detrimental effect on the industry and have led to many different ideas on how to combat the parasite. Mortality rates of salmon during the 1990s and 2000s was rated at about 20% of eventual production tonnage. The indications are that this percentage is increasing. Companies have been moving away from using chemical and water washes to rid the salmon of lice, with a more 'natural' method being the use of wrasse and lumpsucker fish which clean the fish of the parasites.

Additionally, the increase in production has led to waste produced by the salmon settling on the sea-bed of the Scottish sea lochs. Companies have been trying large storm-proof cages that can be deployed further out to sea, thus the current will spread the waste over a larger area. Another benefit of the cages is that the stronger currents will make the salmon swim harder and increase their muscle tone, which makes them comparable to wild salmon. The Scottish Environment Protection Agency has indicated that providing the newer farms further out to sea meet the standards required "on chemical, faecal and organic waste pollution in surrounding seas", it would not place a restriction on these newer farms.

Salmon farming has also led to criticism from wildlife groups, conservationist and anglers, all of whom point to lower levels of wild salmon swimming up river to spawn. They allege that the mass proliferation of sea farming methods has had a detrimental effect on the wild salmon species. One journalist pointed out that a 40-metre (130 ft) cage could hold up to 70,000 fish, which he said was the equivalent of "..a series of floating battery hen sheds; salmon has long been sold on the prospect of cleanliness and health. The impression is fraudulent."

A Parliamentary committee raised the possibility of salmon farms being located on land to avoid the prevalence of sea lice. One speaker at the committee's hearing stated that they were spending £50 million to produce 1,000 tonnes (1,100 tons) of fish, and that the added cost of building concrete structures to house the fish would cost extra and would be power hungry, therefore negating the CO_{2} benefits of having open pens/cages in the sea.

Due to the large number of salmon migratory rivers on the east coast of Scotland, no salmon farms have been allowed to be sited in that area.

In 2025, The Food Policy Institute called for a moratorium on new intensive fish farms in Scottish sea lochs, pending compliance with environmental and welfare standards and giving the Scottish Government time to audit, monitor properly, and adapt regulation.

=== Northern Ireland ===
In 2007, the only salmon farm on the coast of Northern Ireland lost all its stock of 100,000 fish when a swarm of "billions" of jellyfish (mauve stingers pelagia noctiluca) got into the nets and killed them all. A similar event occurred in 2014 at a fish farm in Loch Duart on North Uist. The jellyfish is small enough to get into the pens holding the salmon, but its usual habitat is further south in the Mediterranean. Scientist have stated that is appearance in UK waters is a sign of global warming. The company restructured in 2008 and was able to achieve production in 2009 under a different name. It advertises itself as being an organic farm and is spread across two sites at Glenarm and Red Bay in County Antrim.

Like their Scottish neighbours, the location of farmed fish has been cited as the reason for the drop of wild salmon migrating upriver to spawn. A monitoring station on the River Bush has found that numbers of migrating fish have dropped by a third in some years.

=== England and Wales ===
Minimal salmon farming is undertaken in Wales. In 2012, a total of 452 tonnes (498 tons) of finfish were produced in Wales, however, this also accounts for trout, turbot, carp and goldfish which makes the amount of farmed salmon quite small in comparison with Scotland. However, the tonnage and relative price of the salmon market makes salmon the most valuable food item in the United Kingdom that is exported and which supports a network of jobs in rural areas. Most salmon farming in England is at designated hatcheries which then release the juvenile fish (smolts) into designated salmon rivers.

== Mussels ==
The production of mussels in the coastal water around the United Kingdom is likely to be affected by climate change. A Government report in 2018 estimated that a 1 °C (1.8 °F) temperature rise in seawater could lead to a reduction of 50% in mussel aquaculture. One variant of mussel aquaculture is less labour-intensive than other aquaculture strands as growers simply install lines in the sea and wild mussels attach themselves to the lines feeding off naturally occurring plankton. All the grower has to do is harvest the mussels at the right point in their growing cycle. However, in North Wales, the farmers are constantly moving their mussels along the sea-bed to deeper and deeper water to promote growth.

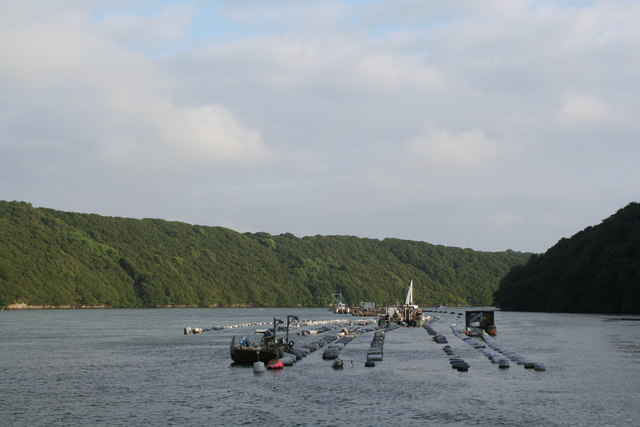
Mussel farm on the River Fal

The global mussel market is worth over £1.5 billion annually (2018) and represents the largest tonnage in Europe, but the second largest after salmon aquaculture in the UK.

=== England ===
Mussels are farmed offshore in Cornwall and Devon. One site off the coast at Brixham, (the largest in England which covers over 5.8 square miles (15 km^{2})) was the first mussel farm in Europe to gain Best Aquaculture Practice certification. Another mussel farm in Cornwall is located in St Austell Bay and also supports one of the seaweed farmers and is a release point for lobsters from the Padstow Lobster Hatchery.

=== Scotland ===
In 2018, the Scottish industry produced 6,874 tonnes (7,577 tons) of mussels with a value of £7.8 million. (Note: The total shellfish capture in 2018 from Scotland was 7,212 tonnes (7,950 tons) and an income of £9.5 million.) The bulk of mussel production comes from Shetland, and the Western Isles. No shellfish are farmed on the eastern coast of Scotland.

Mussel farming is a large industry in Scotland, one company has 14 sites and provides over 70% of the mussel crop from Scotland every year.

=== Wales ===
Mussels are farmed in North wales around the Menai Strait and Conwy. Small mussel farming also takes place on the coast of South Wales. Around the Menai Strait, the mussel farmers use boats to capture young mussels and they site them in the intertidal zone which dries out at low tide. This prompts hard shell growth, and as they get bigger, they are moved further offshore until they are submerged all the time which prompts body mass build-up. The vast majority of mussels exported from the United Kingdom are from the mussel farms in North wales.

A proposal to create a tidal lagoon in Swansea Bay to create electricity would have provided a perfect site to farm mussels. Although the project was shelved by the UK Government, in early 2019, the company behind the idea was still hoping it would come to fruition with other investment. A report commissioned by a local oyster company detailed the possibility of farming mussel, native oyster, pacific oyster, the European clam and macroalgae (seaweed).

=== Other shellfish ===
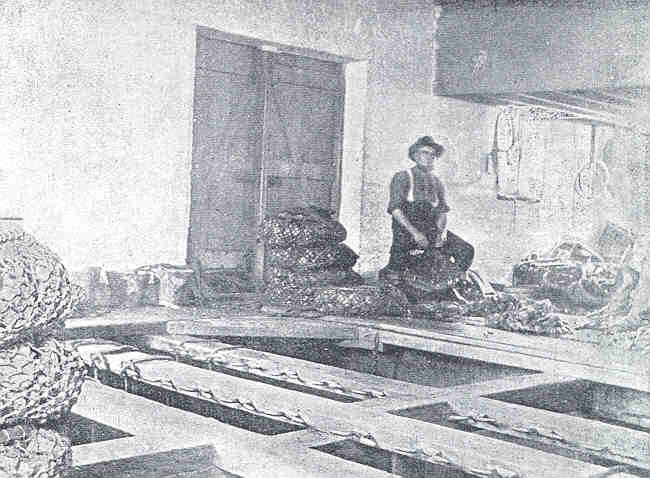
Whitstable, England. Storage pits of the Whitstable Company; Sorting the Oysters

Oysters are also reared in Loch Fyne, Argyll and Bute by the Loch Fyne Oysters company. Another company, Scot-Hatch, grow scallops in the waters of Loch Ewe, but they are all sent to Norway for spawning. The company produced 750,000 scallops in 2012. Oyster harvesting has been a traditional shellfish industry in the town of Whitstable, Kent, for centuries, but after diseases and overfishing affected the oysters, the company started to farm Pacific rock oysters. Oysters are also farmed in Poole Harbour and the River Blackwater near Maldon in Essex. Most oysters that are farmed are pacific oysters rather than the native Atlantic oyster. An increase in sewage, loss of habitat, overfishing and some very cold winters led to a decline in the native Atlantic oyster industry. The British Shellfish Association estimates that there are over 20 oyster beds in estuaries around the United Kingdom, most do not farm, but just harvest.

A rapid decline in the oyster farming industry around The Solent on the south coast of England, led to a ban on oyster fishing in that area. In 2017, a new programme was started whereby millions of oysters will be 'seeded' between the south coast and the Isle of Wight in an attempt to kick-start the industry. The project is expected to reach fruition in 2022.

== Trout ==
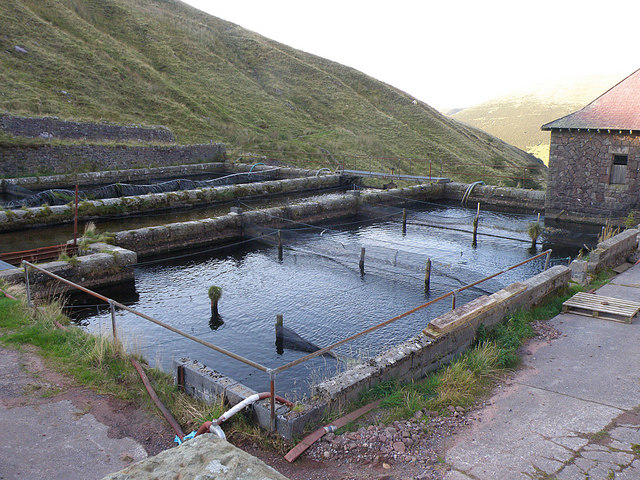
Trout farm in Wales

Whilst some trout is reared in sea cages like salmon on the Scottish coast, the bulk of trout aquaculture in the United Kingdom is in freshwater ponds, situated on land. There are scarce locations available in England, Northern Ireland and Wales that are suitable for rearing trout at sea, unlike in Scotland. However, rainbow trout reared in Northern Ireland have been exported to Scotland to bolster numbers at onshore farms. Their life-cycle stage has been described as "part-grown". There are up to 350 registered sites across the United Kingdom dedicated to raising rainbow and brown trout, although these are all registered as private companies in Britain as opposed to the larger international companies that are involved in salmon farming.

== Seaweed ==
There are around 700 species of seaweed growing around the shores of the United Kingdom, with an estimated crop of 10,000,000 tonnes (11,000,000 tons). (Note: This is a 1954 estimate and long standing baseline. However, in 2008, a revised number of between 30,000,000 tonnes (33,000,000 tons) and 50,000,000 tonnes (55,000,000 tons) was inferred by a failure of the 1954 report to take into account algal biomass during sampling.) Seaweed harvesting has been going on in Britain for many centuries and had many uses; food, iodine, glass production, animal feed and fertiliser. Strangford Lough in Northern Ireland has a distinct history of this and still has several kelp-ovens that were used to cook the seaweed. Seaweed harvesting requires a licence from the Crown Estate which governs the coast up to 12 miles (19 km) from the shoreline, but seaweed farming (macroalgae aquaculture) requires a licence granted by the Marine Management Organisation (MMO) in England, the DAERA (inshore), MMO (offshore) in Northern Ireland, Marine Scotland in Scotland and either the National Resources Wales (NRW) (inland) or the MMO (offshore waters) in Wales.

Small licences have been granted to companies and individuals in Cornwall in England, Pembrokeshire in Wales and several concerns in Scotland. However, all of these are harvesters of naturally grown seaweed, a process that involves cutting the plant but leaving the rootzone behind to allow the seaweed to regenerate. Seaweed farming, IE actually planting and harvesting the crop, is still a relatively new industry in comparison to some countries in Asia who have been seaweed farming for centuries. Most of the companies and universities trying seaweed farming are doing so for non-food related industries, such as research into bio-fuels.

There are between 15 and 20 companies who harvest seaweed in the United Kingdom, but most only collect from wild stocks on the shoreline, and as such, are not partaking in the aquaculture industry proper. The list below only details those who are seeding specialist areas to grow seaweed before harvesting.

Seaweed growers in the United Kingdom
Name	Founded	Location	Industry	Notes	Refs
Cornish Seaweed Company	2012	Cornwall	Food	Based in Falmouth, but have a farm on The Lizard in Cornwall. The first company to successfully cultivate seaweed at sea in a commercial venture.	
CPI UK	2015 (Note: This is the date when the project started, not the start date of the company)	UK	Biogas	CPI is running a project to develop a biogas industry from seaweed. In May 2017, 20 tonnes (22 tons) batch of sugar kelp seaweed was harvested from Strangford Lough in Northern Ireland. The project is in partnership with The Crown Estate, CEFAS, SAMS, Queen's University Belfast and Newcastle University.	
Irish Seaweeds	1990	Antrim	Food, cosmetics, nutraceuticals	Company was founded in 1990 and has harvested seaweed from the Northern Irish coasts, but has also grown seaweed in Strangford Lough	
Ocean Veg Ireland	2014	Rathlin Island	Food	The company was set up as a direct result of the Fukushima Disaster, which had an effect on the seaweed market in Japan, China and The United States, as seaweed could not be farmed from many areas because of contamination. At the time of the company's set-up, there were problems in the supply chain of kelp.	
Pembroke Dock MacroBioCrude	2016	Pembroke Dock	Biofuel	The project was a joint programme between the University of Swansea and Milford Haven Port Authority to research the possibilities of using seaweed derivatives as a fuel	
SAMS	2013–2017	Argyll and Bute	Research	Scottish Association for Marine Science (SAMS), have developed two sites on the isles of Kerrera (2013) and Lismore (2017), to develop the seaweed industry	
SeaGrown	2018	Yorkshire	Bioplastics, food, cosmetics	The company is based out of Scarborough in North Yorkshire and started England's first large-scale commercial seaweed farm in 2018	

In 2025 the Food Policy Institute outlined the legislative steps that would be required to make seaweed cultivation commercially viable in the UK.

== Others ==
In the 1970s, the North American signal crayfish was introduced into some farms in England to rear as food. The species escaped and caused damage to British Rivers by destabilising the riverbanks (it burrows to lay eggs, which caused them to collapse and add sediment to rivers) and, because it carries Crayfish plague, it also almost wiped out the native white clawed crayfish, the only indigenous species in Great Britain, which have no resistance to the disease. By 1992, legislation against introducing the species into Britain had been passed, though no farms were thought to be raising the signal crayfish anyway, as it was deemed to be unprofitable as a food.

Other fish are farmed commercially in the United Kingdom; small amounts of sea trout, common carp, halibut and Nile tilapia. Fish are also bred commercially for fish feed and also for the ornamental pond/tank market. Halibut is farmed at an onshore farm using recirculation tanks on the Isle of Gigha in Scotland.

Sea bass used to be farmed at an on-land recirculation farm, in Anglesey, North Wales. The site went out of business in 2015 when a glut of sea bass from Greece and Turkey flooded the market. In 2017, the site was re-purposed to breed wrasse for use in salmon farms in Scotland, where they would be employed in removing sea lice from the fish.

A short lived venture in Shetland between 2004 and 2008 produced organically reared cod. The venture failed when the company went into administration blaming several issues including organic certification and resale value of the fish, which was deemed excessive in view of wild caught cod.

== Conservation ==
Some programmes are in place to preserve or maintain species which are challenged in their natural environment by raising them in a protected environment. One such example in the United Kingdom is the freshwater pearl mussel (Margaritifera margaritifera) which can live for over 100 years, but have seen a loss of their habitat through changes in water quality and being fished for their pearls. The species was given protected status in the Wildlife and Countryside Act 1981, and hunting, selling or buying the pearls has been illegal since 1998, hasn't stopped illegal activity in removing them from rivers. Another problem in the breeding cycle of the freshwater pearl mussel is that when the young are released by the female, they attach to the gills of passing salmon and trout (without causing any harm to the host fish) and as these fish are now rarer in some rivers, this too has had an effect on the survival of the species.

The mussel is found in several rivers in Scotland, Wales and in Northern Ireland, but was believed to have existed in only two river systems in England (Cumbria and Northumberland). However, small colonies of mussels were found elsewhere in the River Lune in Lancashire and in the River Clun in Shropshire. This was later expanded in 2017 to include 11 watercourses in England with populations numbering as few as 50 (Swindale Beck) to as many as 20,000 (River Rede and River North Tyne). Mussels from the Lune were taken to a fish farm in Cumbria and were left to breed in a tank that fed the water to a downstream tank with fish in. This managed to raise over 4,000 baby mussels which were kept for five years before being released into the River Lune in 2012.

Crayfish at Cynrig Hatchery

Dedicated hatcheries are running breeding programmes to increase the freshwater pearl mussel numbers. Natural Resources Wales have a hatchery at Cynrig near Brecon, and another hatchery is near to the Kielder Beck in Northumberland. The Cynrig Hatchery also have a breeding programme for the white clawed crayfish (Austropotamobius pallipes) which has suffered a severe decline in Britain (and across Europe) as a result of insecticides and having no natural resistance to a crayfish plague introduced by alien species. Since the crayfish programme was started in 2009, the hatchery has successfully bred and released over 5,000 crayfish into British rivers. In the wild, the crayfish have a 10% chance of survival, the ones released from the hatchery are estimated to have an 80% survival rate, with evidence of first generation crayfish breeding the second generation completely naturally.

== Production values ==
The table below gives production values in imperial tonnes for UK aquaculture. Whilst this does take into account finfish, shellfish and seaweeds, the largest weight is the finfish industry, especially farmed salmon from Scotland.

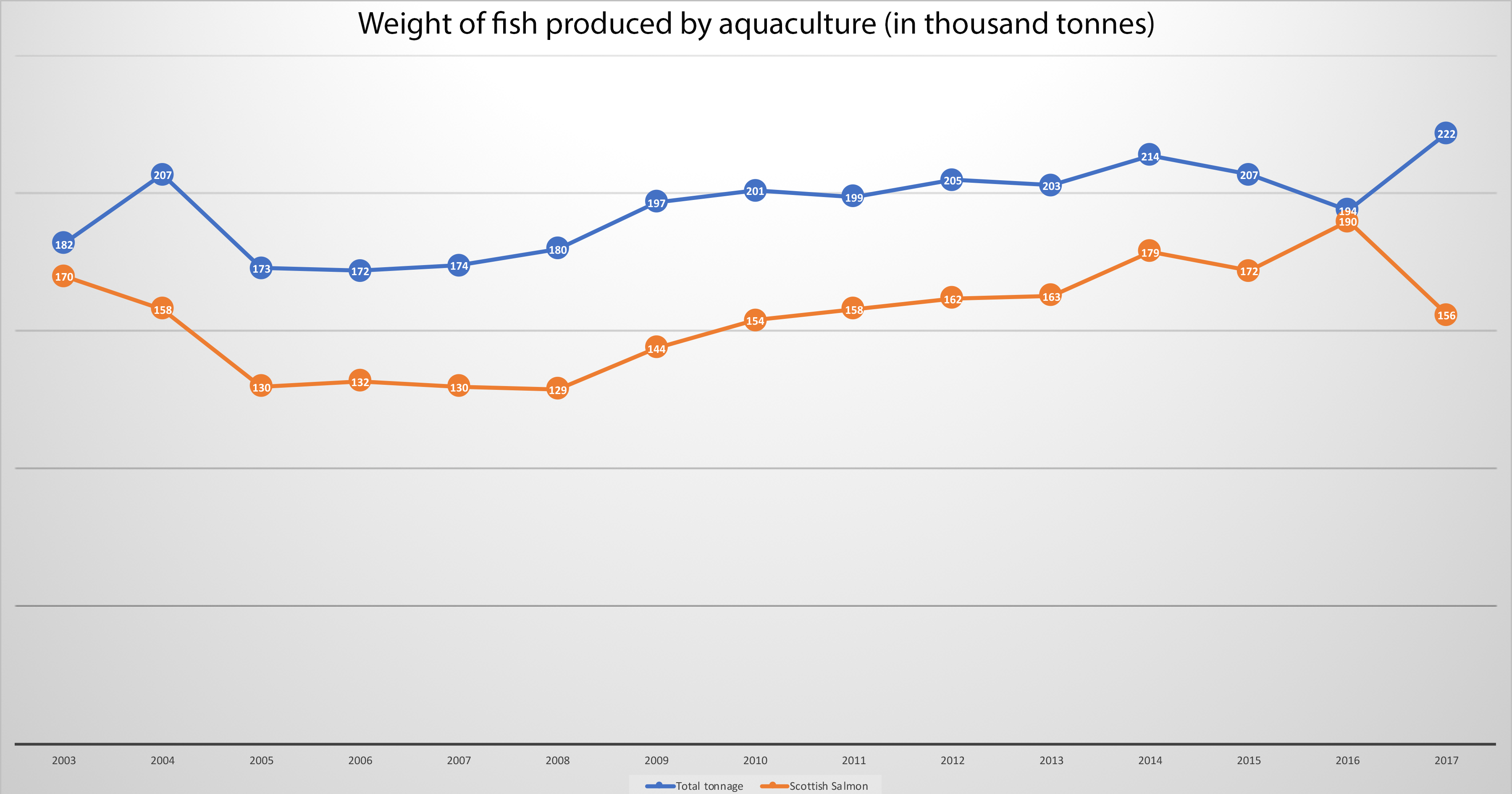
The tonnage of Aquaculture produced in the United Kingdom from 2003 to 2017

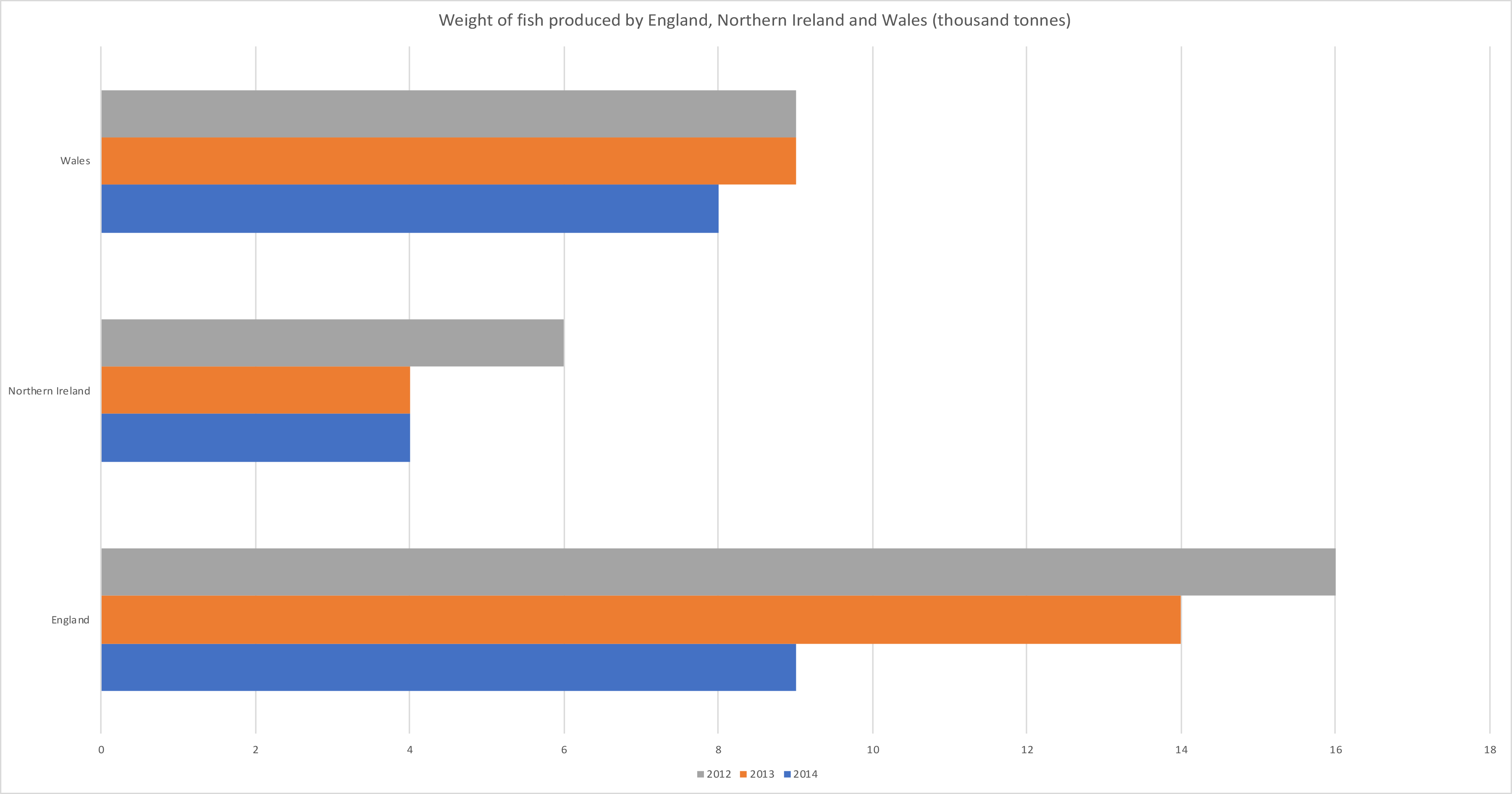
The tonnage of Aquaculture produced in England, Wales and Northern Ireland in 2012, 2013 and 2014

Tonnage of production by year (Note: The statistics for the years 2008–2011 in the total tonnage column have been rounded to the nearest 100)
Year	Total tonnage aquaculture	Scottish salmon tonnage	% of salmon aquaculture
2003	181,838	169,736	93.34
2004	207,203	158,099	76.30
2005	172,813	129,588	74.98
2006	171,848	131,847	76.72
2007	174,203	129,930	74.58
2008	179,800	128,606	71.52
2009	196,600	144,247	73.37
2010	201,400	154,164	76.54
2011	199,000	158,018	79.40
2012	205,134	162,223	79.08
2013	203,363	163,234	80.26
2014	214,345	179,022	83.52
2015	206,834	171,722	83.02
2016	194,492	189,707	97.53
2017	222,434	156,025	69.51

Aquaculture represents a significant business for the UK; in 2011, over 199,000 tonnes (219,000 tons) was produced at a value of £640 million (€740 million). In 2012, this had risen to over 200,000 tonnes (220,000 tons) and earned £700 million (€793 million).

== Research, monitoring and hatcheries ==
Except for the tonnages of fish and shellfish reared through aquaculture described above, several other sites produce, monitor or research aquatic organisms. A selection of these are:

- Amble Lobster Hatchery - allows lobsters to get to a juvenile stage and then releases them into the local seas
- ARCH UK (Aquaculture Research Collaborative Hub for the UK) - a collaborative research project led by the University of Exeter and CEFAS
- Ballinderry Fish Hatchery in County Tyrone - was used to breed freshwater pearl mussel young
- Bushmills Salmon Station
- CEFAS (Centre for Environment, Fisheries and Aquaculture Science) - UK Government run centre based in Lowestoft
- Freshwater Biological Association, based in Windermere - have successfully grown baby pearl mussel to seed rivers in the United Kingdom
- Kielder Salmon Centre, Kielder - the largest salmon hatchery in England. Has also successfully bred freshwater pearl mussel for re-stocking the River North Tyne
- National Lobster Hatchery, Padstow - released over 100,000 juvenile lobsters between 2000 and 2014
- Orkney lobster hatchery - release about 60,000 juvenile lobsters into the wild annually

== See also ==
- Friend of the Sea
- Seaweed farming
- North Atlantic Salmon Conservation Organization
