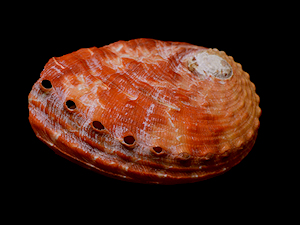
- Image of a shell of Haliotis rugosa

Conservation status
- Least Concern (IUCN 3.1)

Scientific classification
- Kingdom: Animalia
- Phylum: Mollusca
- Class: Gastropoda
- Subclass: Vetigastropoda
- Order: Lepetellida
- Family: Haliotidae
- Genus: Haliotis
- Species: H. rugosa

Binomial name
- Haliotis rugosa Lamarck, 1822

Synonyms
- Haliotis alternata G.B. Sowerby II, 1882; Haliotis multiperforata Reeve, 1846; Haliotis nebulata Reeve, 1846; Haliotis pertusa Reeve, 1846; Haliotis revelata Deshayes, 1863

= Haliotis rugosa =

Species of gastropod

Haliotis rugosa, common name the many-holed abalone, is a species of sea snail, a marine gastropod mollusk in the family Haliotidae, the abalone.

Haliotis rugosa Reeve, 1846 is a homonym of Haliotis tuberculata Linnaeus, 1758.

== Subspecies ==
- Haliotis rugosa multiperforata Reeve, 1846
- Haliotis rugosa pustulata Reeve, 1846 (distribution: off Madagascar and the east coast of Africa, to the Red Sea and east to Yemen)
- Haliotis rugosa rodriguensis Owen, 2013 (distribution: Rodrigues Island, Mascarene Islands, Indian Ocean)
- Haliotis rugosa rugosa Lamarck, 1822

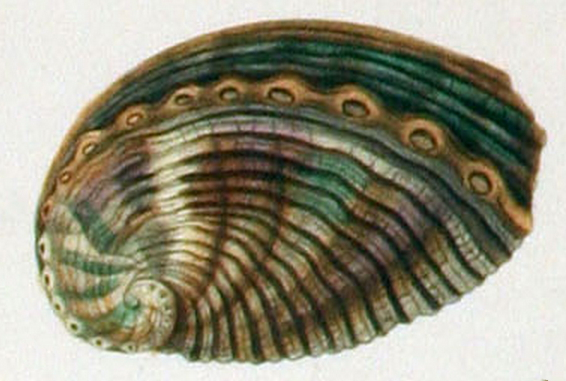
Original drawing of a shell of Haliotis rugosa rugosa

== Description ==
The size of the shell varies between 30 mm and 70 mm. The shells are oblong, barely arched, and slightly convex. They sport many colours in irregular bands or splotches along the outside of the shell, colours include: lime-green, bright white, and purple-maroon brown. The left side of the shell has many elevated holes set equally distant from each other, and are formed due to the breathing process. These sea snails breath through tubular filaments protruding from each hole, as such, the number of holes in an individual's shell does not change much though its several stages of growth.

== Distribution ==
This species occurs in the Western Indian Ocean from the Red Sea south through most of the eastern coast of Africa, and east to Réunion and Mauritius.
