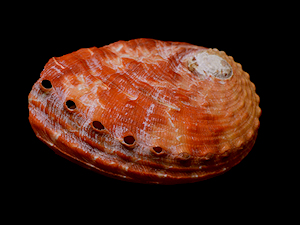
- Top view of a shell of Haliotis rugosa pustulata

Scientific classification
- Kingdom: Animalia
- Phylum: Mollusca
- Class: Gastropoda
- Subclass: Vetigastropoda
- Order: Lepetellida
- Family: Haliotidae
- Genus: Haliotis
- Species: H. rugosa
- Subspecies: H. r. pustulata

Trinomial name
- Haliotis rugosa pustulata Reeve, 1846

Synonyms
- Haliotis (Sulculus) pustulata Reeve, 1846; Haliotis cruenta Reeve, 1846; Haliotis jousseaumi Mabille, 1888; Haliotis pustulata Reeve, 1846 (original rank); Haliotis scutulum Reeve, 1846

= Haliotis rugosa pustulata =

Subspecies of gastropod

Haliotis rugosa pustulata is a subspecies of sea snail, a marine gastropod mollusk in the family Haliotidae, the abalones.

== Description ==
The size of the shell varies between 25 mm and 60 mm. The left side of the shell has holes set equally distant from each other, these holes are made during the breathing process. The Haliotis rugosa pustulata breaths through tubular filaments protruding from each hole, as such, the number of holes on an individual does not change much through its several stages of growth.

== Distribution ==
This marine subspecies occurs in the Red Sea and in the western part of the Indian Ocean.
