= Badcall, Scourie =

Coordinates: 58.32581°N 5.15422°W

Badcall: Scottish Gaelic: Bada Call
- Location within the Sutherland area
- OS grid reference: NC153418
- Council area: Highland
- Lieutenancy area: Sutherland
- Country: Scotland
- Sovereign state: United Kingdom
- Post town: Lairg
- Postcode district: IV27 4
- Police: Scotland
- Fire: Scottish
- Ambulance: Scottish

Badcall comprises two remote hamlets, called Lower Badcall and Upper Badcall. Upper Badcall, a crofting township, is the larger of the two and is situated on the western shore of Badcall Bay. Lower Badcall is located less than 1 mile to the east on the eastern shore of Badcall Bay. Badcall is on the west coast of Sutherland, Scottish Highlands and is in the Scottish council area of Highland.

Badcall Bay is reached by the A894, the west coast route to the very north of Scotland. The village of Scourie lies 2 miles northwest.

The bay is located in a remote area of outstanding natural beauty in a region designed as Scotland's first ‘Global Geopark’. Nearby the hamlets there are numerous small islands.

The area home is to The Eddrachilles Hotel and The Salmon House, HQ of Loch Duart Ltd, an independent salmon farm. A small family-owned site, Badcall Bay Holiday Caravans, is nearby on the outskirts of Scourie.

The Badcall area offers a wide range of opportunities for walking, fishing, kayaking, climbing and hill walking throughout the area.

== Gallery ==
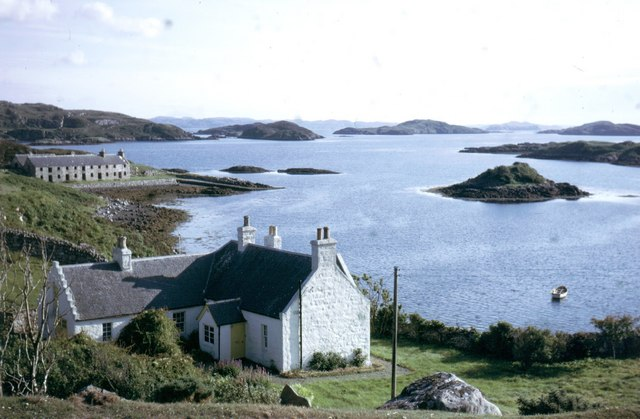
Badcall Bay.

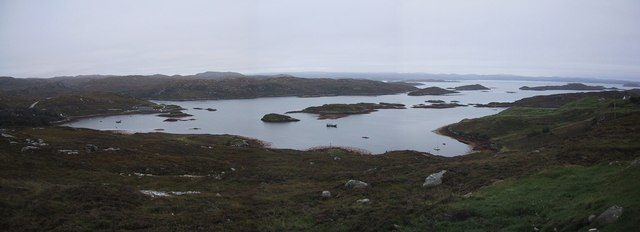
Badcall Bay from Upper Badcall.

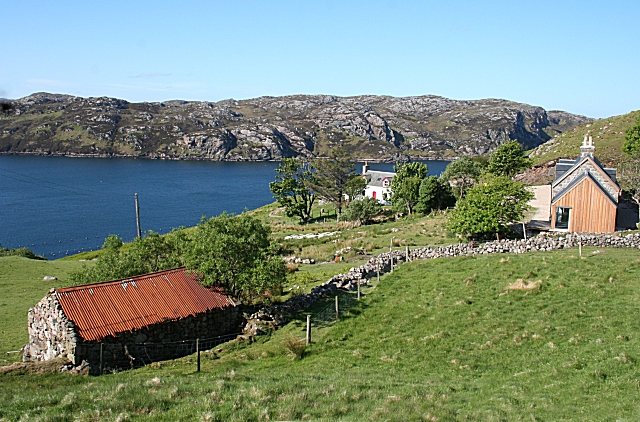
Badcall and Loch Inchard. These cottages enjoy one of the best views anywhere.

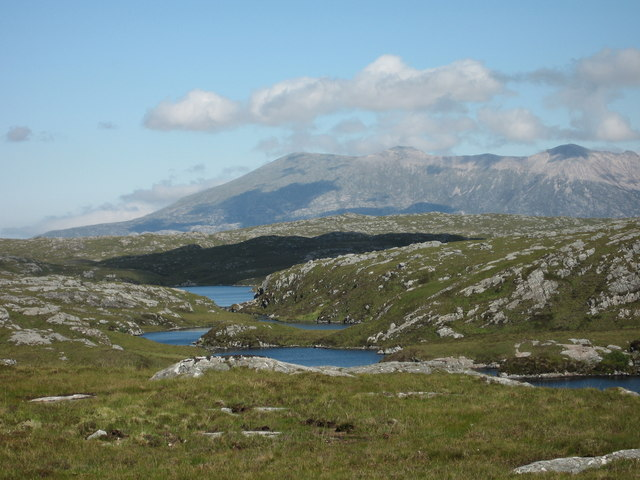
Clar Loch Cnoc Thormaid The distant loch is Clar Loch Mor.

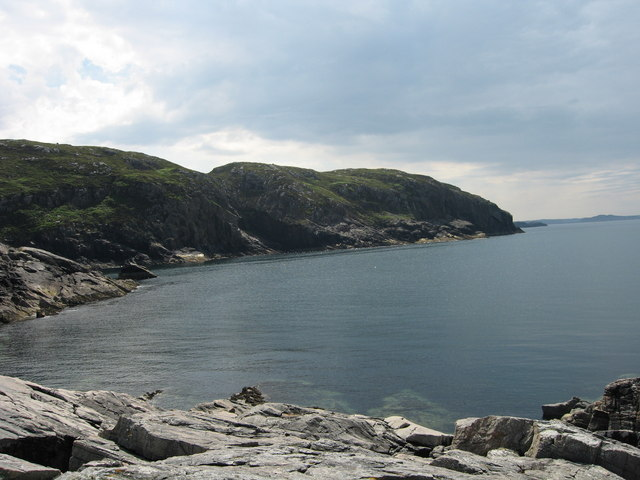
Cliffs near Scourie Climbing cliffs near Loch a' Mhill Dheirg.

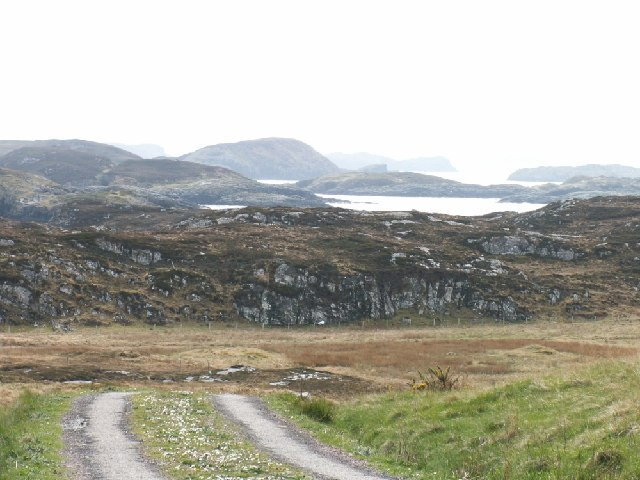
End of the Badcall road. The end of the single track road to Badcall. From here on it is a grass strip down the middle of road to the last crofts around the corner.

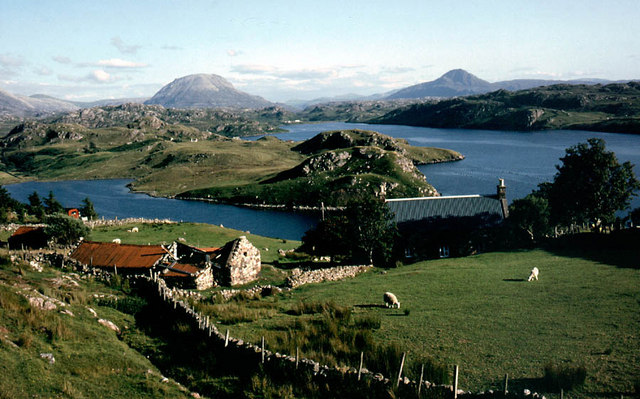
Fields below Badcall This is the view below the road as you enter Badcall from the west.

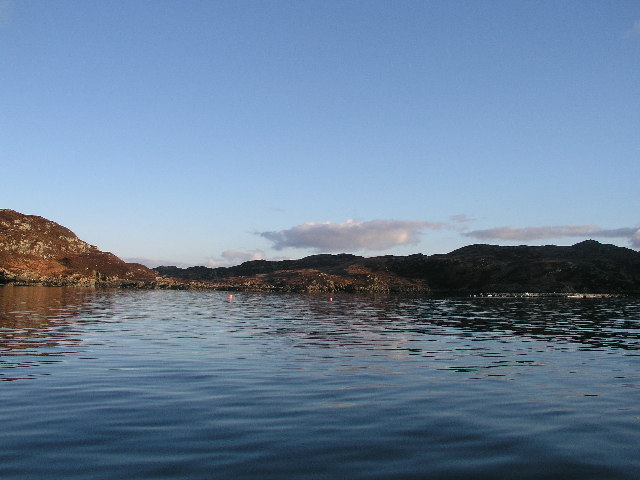
Fish farming in Calbha Bay.

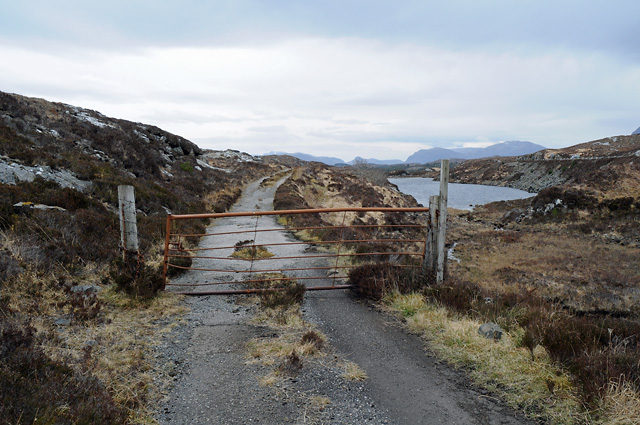
Gate on Track North of Loch a' Mhinidh.

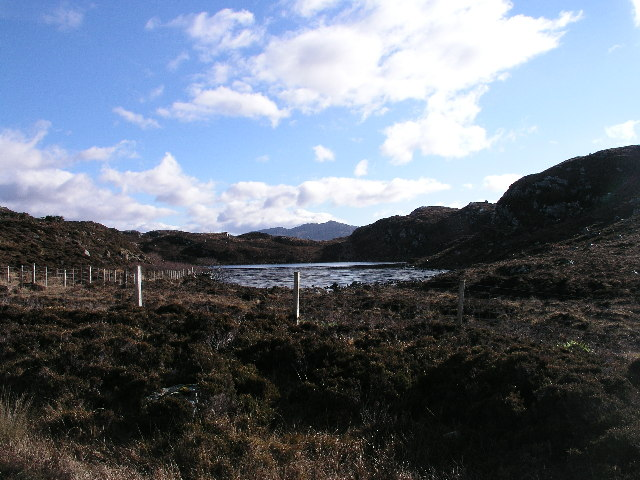
Loch an Daimh Mor.

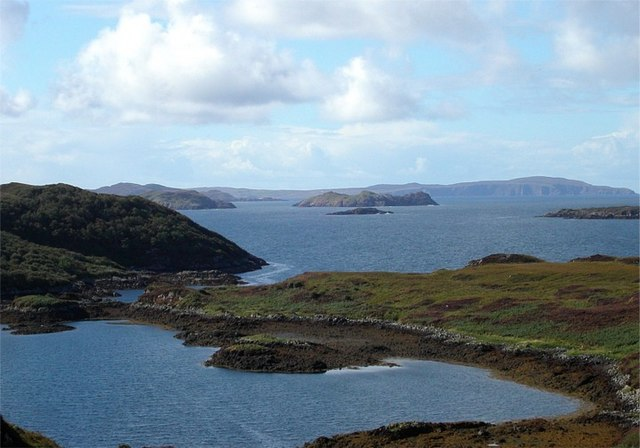
Loch an Obain.

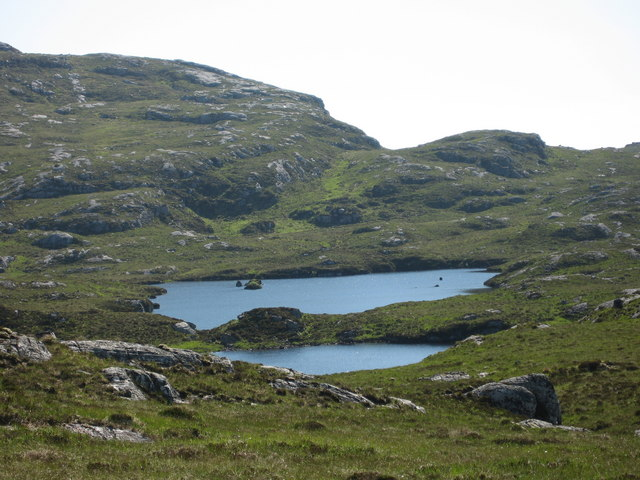
Lochan near Loch nan Uidh

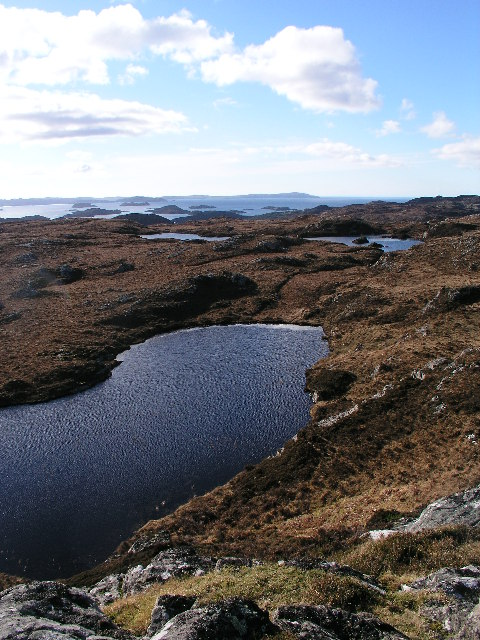
Looking out towards Badcall Bay.

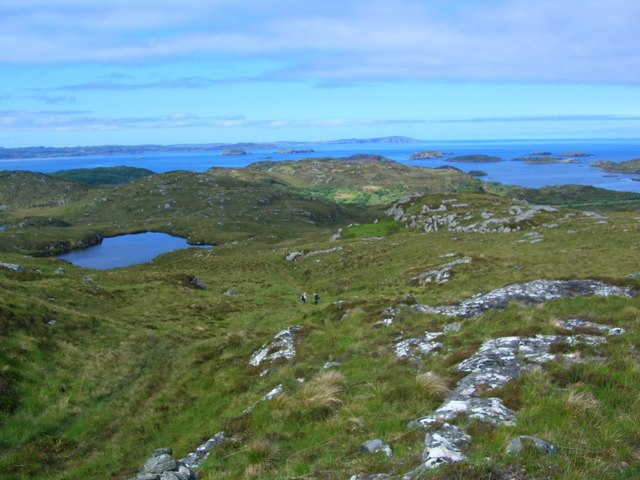
The track above Geisgeil

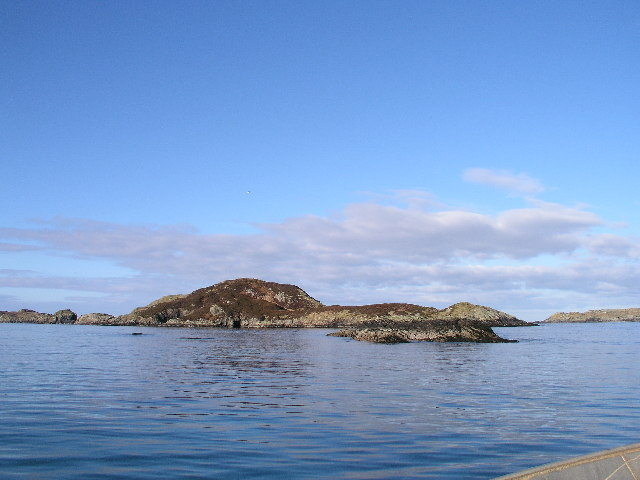
Towards Ceannamhor.

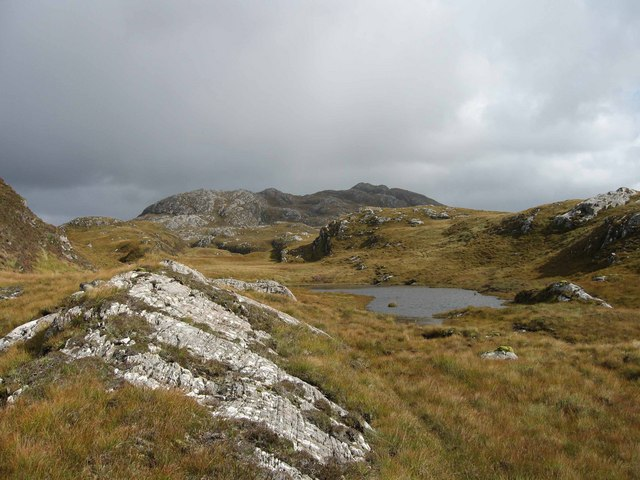
Shallow Lochan
