= National Lobster Hatchery =

Coordinates: 50.5385°N 4.9350°W

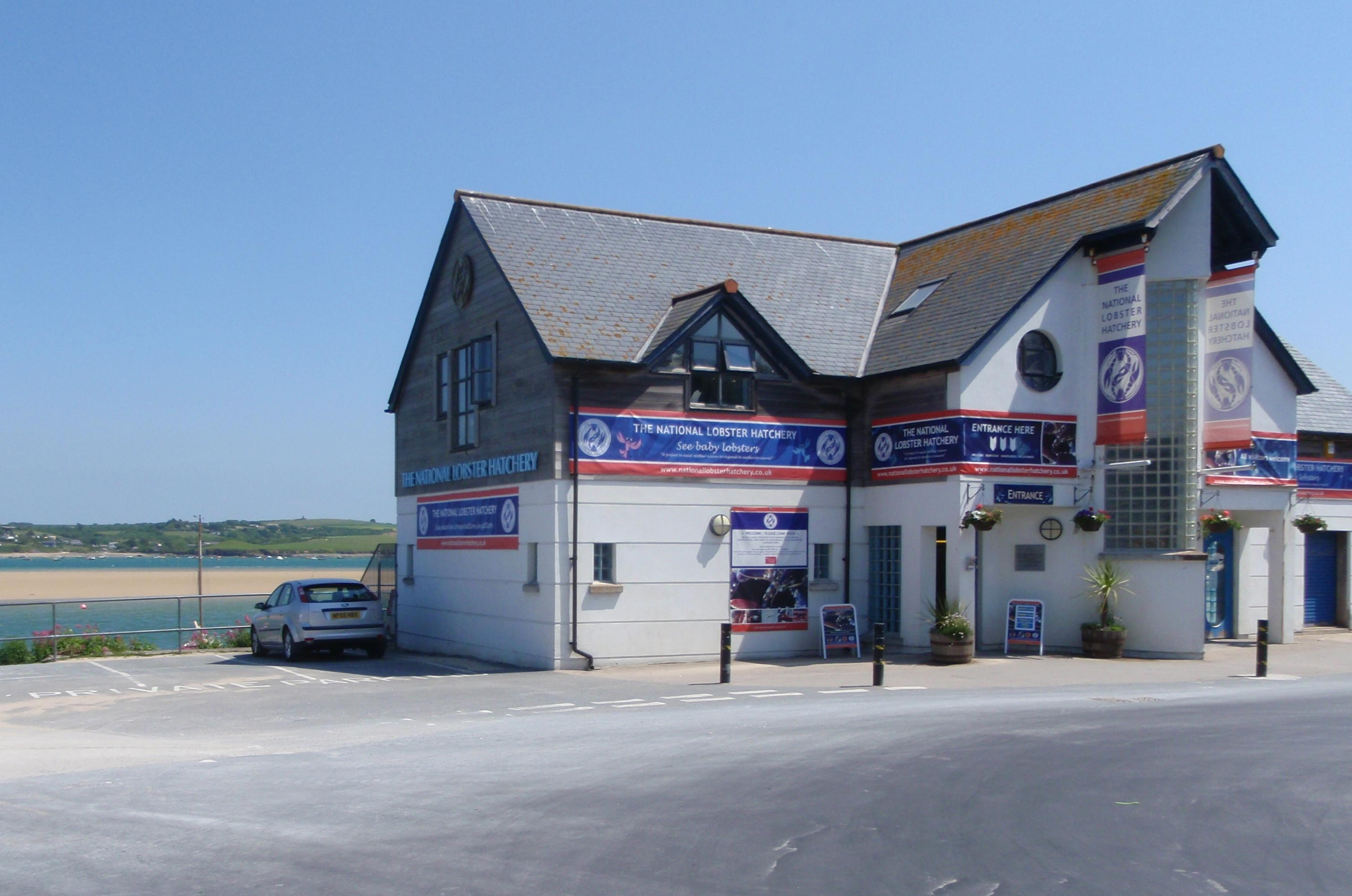
- The National Lobster Hatchery visitor centre in Padstow
- Type: Charity
- Headquarters: Padstow, England
- Website: nationallobsterhatchery.co.uk

The National Lobster Hatchery is a charitable organization located in Padstow, England. The hatchery was opened in August 2000 and is situated on South Quay in Padstow, Cornwall. The organisation is a marine conservation, research and education charity that focuses its efforts on the European lobster. It exists to serve the coastal fishing communities of Cornwall and the Isles of Scilly. The hatchery consists of a visitor centre, shop and conference facility, as well as various culture spaces, laboratories and technical facilities.

== Purpose ==
The National Lobster Hatchery is a marine conservation, research and education charity that focuses exclusively on the European Lobster, a commercially exploited species.

=== Conservation ===
The charity's conservation work focuses on enhancing the stocks of lobsters in the coastal waters of Cornwall and the Isles of Scilly. Should stocks collapse (as they have done elsewhere) this work would shift its focus to restocking.

The National Lobster Hatchery is in partnership with a few selected local fishermen and shellfish wholesalers who provide female egg-bearing lobsters which are taken in and held until their eggs hatch. The resulting larvae are then on-grown into their post-larval stages before being released into the coastal waters of Cornwall and the Isles of Scilly.

Juvenile lobsters are released onto suitable substrate, either by dive clubs who deliver the lobsters to the seabed, or by fishermen who effectively pump the juveniles directly onto the sea floor.

The released juveniles will take between four and five years to grow to marketable size. Several studies have estimated very good wild survival rates for hatchery-reared lobsters.

=== Research ===
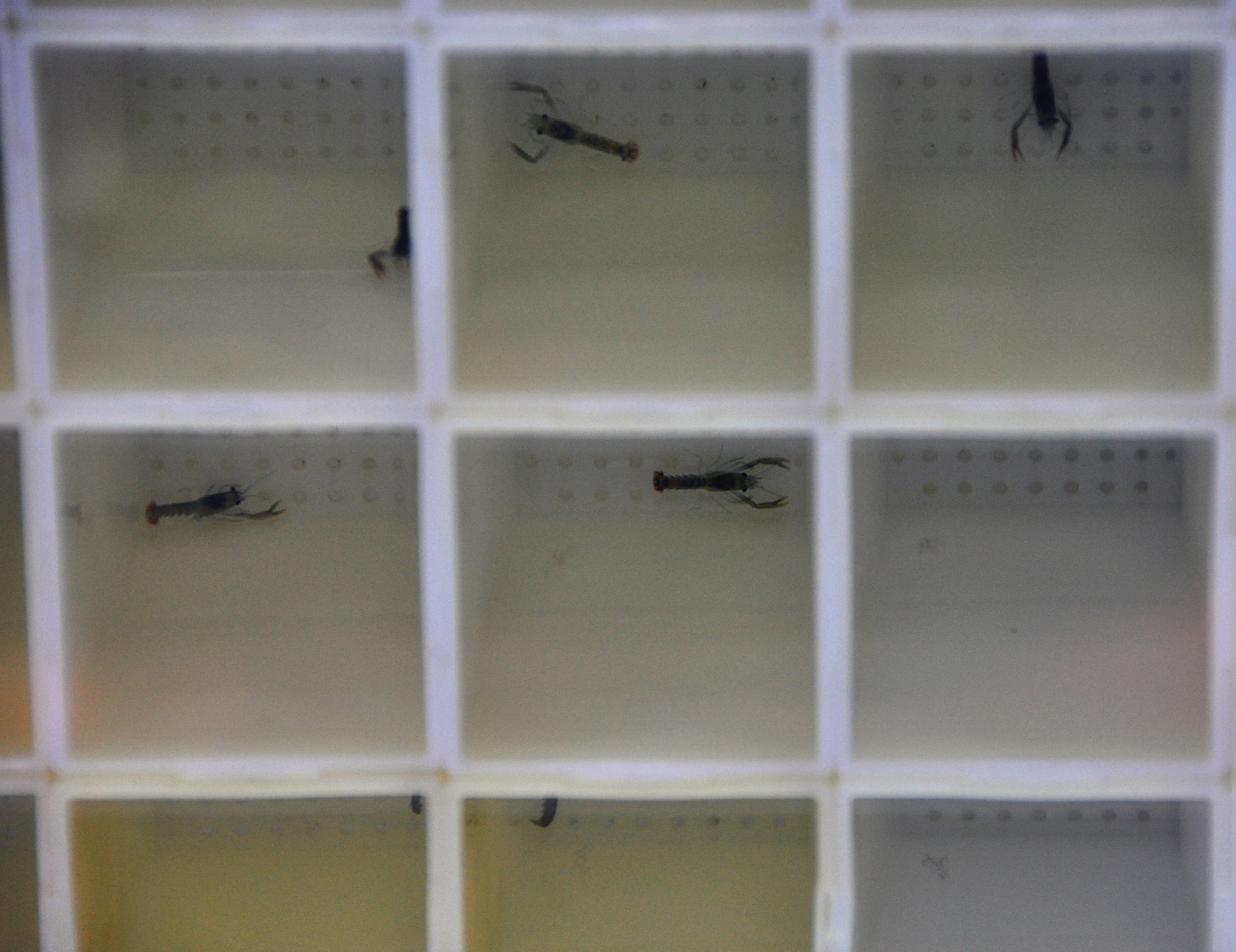
Juvenile lobsters at the hatchery

The research work focuses on two key areas: assessing the effectiveness of stocking work and developing techniques for lobster culture.

The main research priority for the National Lobster Hatchery is to assess the effectiveness of the stock enhancement program. This includes the establishment of a population model for local populations and an assessment of the appropriateness of genetic markers as a tool to measure the program's contribution to catches.

The charity is also focusing efforts on in-house research and development work. These are projects specifically designed to improve the implementation of stock enhancement techniques. The overarching aim of this work is to create an overall improvement in the production of juvenile lobsters, their fitness and their unit costs of production. This work will include improving husbandry techniques, improving our understanding of the nutritional requirements of the European lobster, gaining a better understanding of the implications of disease and improving juvenile health and behaviour, developing effective release systems, and developing artificial habitats for promoting post-release survival.

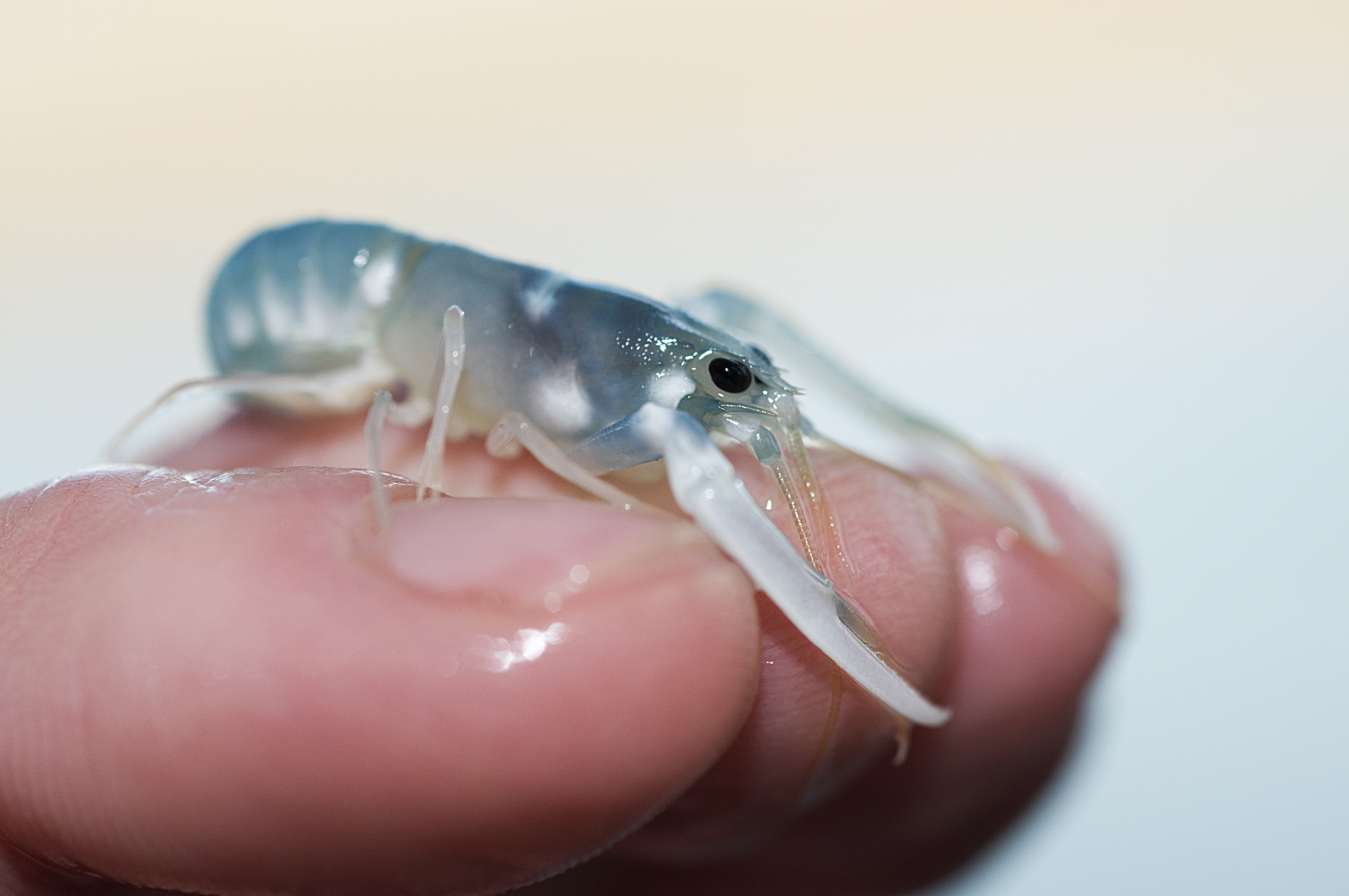
A juvenile European lobster.

=== Education ===
The organisation's education program focuses on raising awareness of the sustainability issues associated with coastal fisheries, promoting traditional and novel fisheries management tools, and highlighting the importance of consumer choice.

The National Lobster Hatchery formally educates people from pre-school to postgraduate. As well as contributing to University courses available nearby, the charity offers student placements and engages postgraduate students from various universities in its research program.

The National Lobster Hatchery is open to visitors, who are able to see the progression of a lobster from egg to adult. Adults and children are able to learn about the wider marine environment, the role of fisheries in coastal communities, the impact of those fisheries on the environment, and the relevance of fisheries management.

== History ==
The National Lobster Hatchery was initiated with a query from a Member of the Cornwall Sea Fisheries Committee in 1992. An enormous amount of work was undertaken by the founding Chairman, Mr Edwin Derriman M.B.E. (the Chief fishery Officer for Cornwall) eventually culminating in the purpose-designed building being erected on the quayside of Padstow, in 2000. The organisation was initially run as a not-for-profit company and charitable status was awarded in 2004. The organisation is now run as a company limited by guarantee and charity, and in 2009 the organisation gained accreditation as a social enterprise. The Directors/Trustees are drawn from relevant disciplines and bodies and are unpaid.

The hatchery was eventually opened to the public in August 2000 although there were many problems associated with life support systems during the early days as well as a lack of visitors due to a foot and mouth outbreak. Subsequently, an upgrade of the life support systems took place in 2005 along with another upgrade to the holding facilities in 2010. The visitor centre has had many facelifts notably in 2005 and 2010. Funds are now being raised for a further upgrade of all the hatchery systems, to increase capacity and to improve the efficiency of the operation.

The National Lobster Hatchery is one of two similar facilities in the UK. The other hatchery is in the Orkney Islands and is financially supported by the Orkney Fishermen's Association.

Lobster hatcheries throughout the world are seen as a very positive way of increasing stock levels and, when mainly funded by visitors (the Padstow facility is one of only 2 facilities in the world so far to do this), the concept is then seen as being cost-effective.

Further research is required to validate the effectiveness of hatcheries and to improve culture techniques. The National Lobster Hatchery has developed numerous partnerships with various research organisations in order to further develop the research capacity of the charity.

== Awards ==
The National Lobster Hatchery has received various awards and accolades including a Pride in Seafood award in 2005 for its contribution to the UK seafood industry.
