= Loch Duart =

Scottish salmon farming company

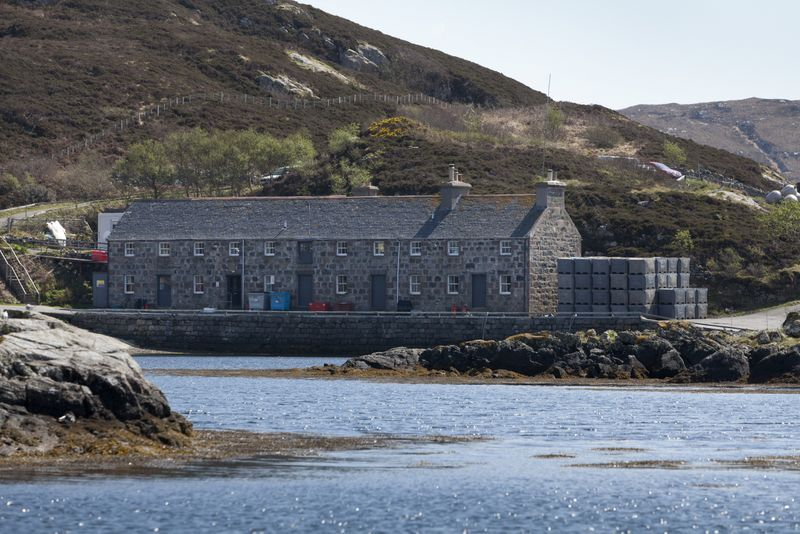
- HQ – Loch Duart Salmon House, Badcall Bay
- Company type: Private Limited Company
- Industry: Salmon farming
- Founded: 1999
- Headquarters: Scourie; Sutherland; Scotland
- Key people: Alban Denton (CEO); Andy Bing (Sales Director)
- Products: farmed salmon
- Revenue: £25 million p.a.
- Website: www.lochduart.com

Loch Duart is a small, independent Scottish salmon farming company. It is headquartered in Scourie, Sutherland in north-west Scotland and has just over 100 employees. The company owns and operates eight sea sites and two hatcheries in Sutherland and the Outer Hebrides. Sales, marketing and finance departments are located in Montrose and a French sales and marketing office in Lorient, Brittany.

The company harvests approximately 5,000 tonnes of fresh salmon annually. Following a ruling in 2019 by the Advertising Standards Authority, Loch Duart Ltd agreed to drop the "sustainable" claim from their marketing.

Loch Duart has teamed up with New Zealand–based firm Oritain to fight the illegal food fraud trade. By using technology which takes trace elements from the loch in which it's farmed, they can match salmon taken from any market in the world and work out whether it is Loch Duart salmon.

== Background ==
The company established in 1999 by three founders, Nick Joy, Alan Balfour and Andy Bing. The company took over some of Scotland’s oldest sea sites in Badcall Bay and nearby, formerly operated by J. Johnston & Sons, with an initial production capacity of 1,800 tonnes p.a. As of 2016 the company produces 5,000 tonnes of fresh salmon annually, generating annual sales of over £25 million.

== Farming system ==
Loch Duart worked with the RSPCA to develop a Freedom Food farmed salmon approval scheme, becoming the first farm to be approved.

=== Husbandry ===
A lower than standard stocking density for salmon at sea. Peak density is 1.5% fish and 98.5% water*. Handling of fish (known to cause stress) is minimised, especially at harvest when humane methods are used.

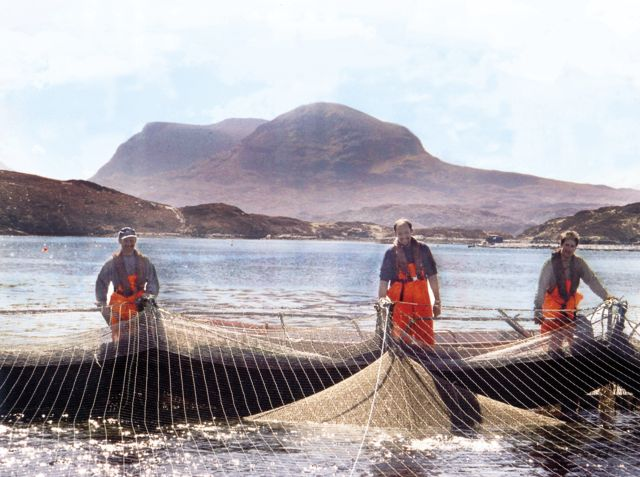
The Swimthrough. Nets are raised for natural cleansing, avoiding the use of anti-foulants

=== Feed ===
Proprietary feed formulation with high fish and fish oil content (salmon are carnivores) from the Icelandic capelin fishery and other sustainable sources, GM free and rigorously tested for contaminants.

=== Antibiotics ===
Total avoidance of antibiotics and minimal use of other medicines.

=== Fallowing ===
Each site is left fallow for a period of 5 to 12 months after each cycle. The pens are removed, as are all traces of farming, allowing natural regeneration of the seabed. This results in production levels roughly half the capacity possible under more intensive regimes but creates a near pristine environment for the smolt when they are brought to sea.

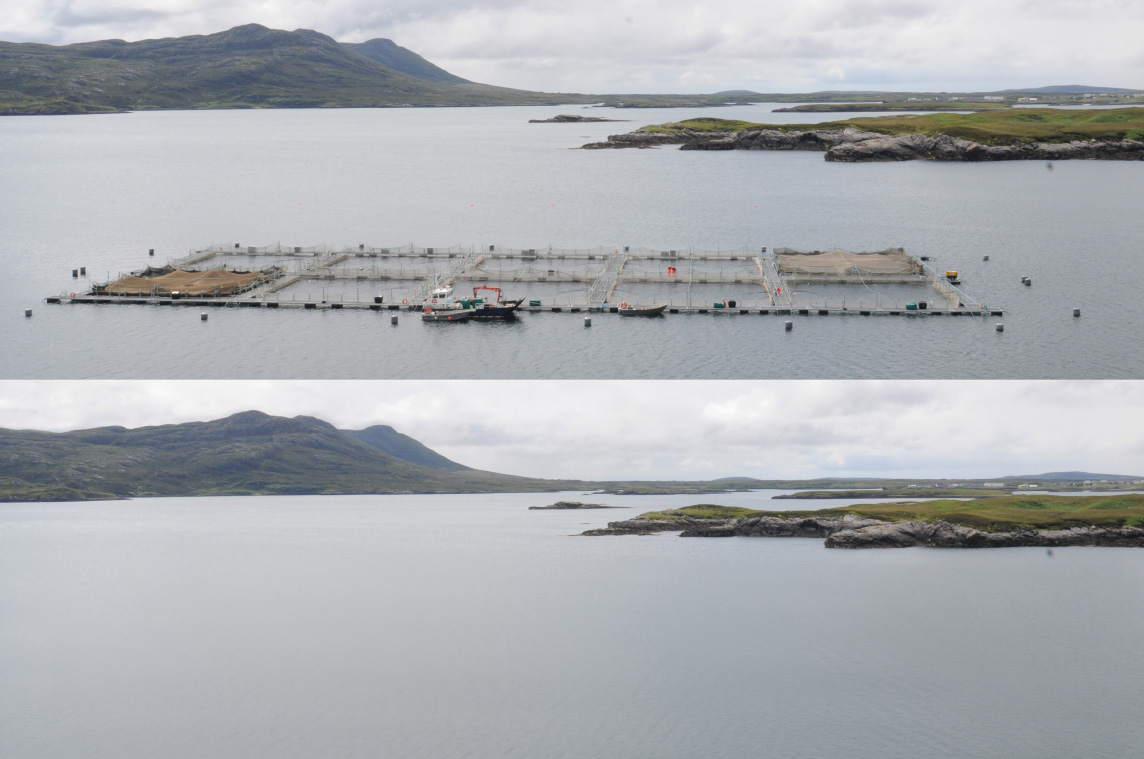
Example of pens having been removed during a fallow period

=== Anti-foulants ===
No use of chemical anti-foulants on pens and nets by using a swim-through system. This allows a fouled net to be pulled up while the fish swim through to the next net and allowed to dry so that marine organisms (seaweed, mussels etc.) dry out and fall back into the water. This reduces production capacity by 5–8% according to site configuration.

=== Sea lice control ===
A proprietary drum filtering system removes lice and eggs during grading and harvesting. A variety of methods to control sea lice have been researched and implemented including the breeding and deployment of cleaner fish (wrasse and lumpfish) which feed on sea lice. Chemical treatments have been used frequently in the past. With all information being available on SEPA's Scottish Pollutant Release Inventory.

== Farming issues ==
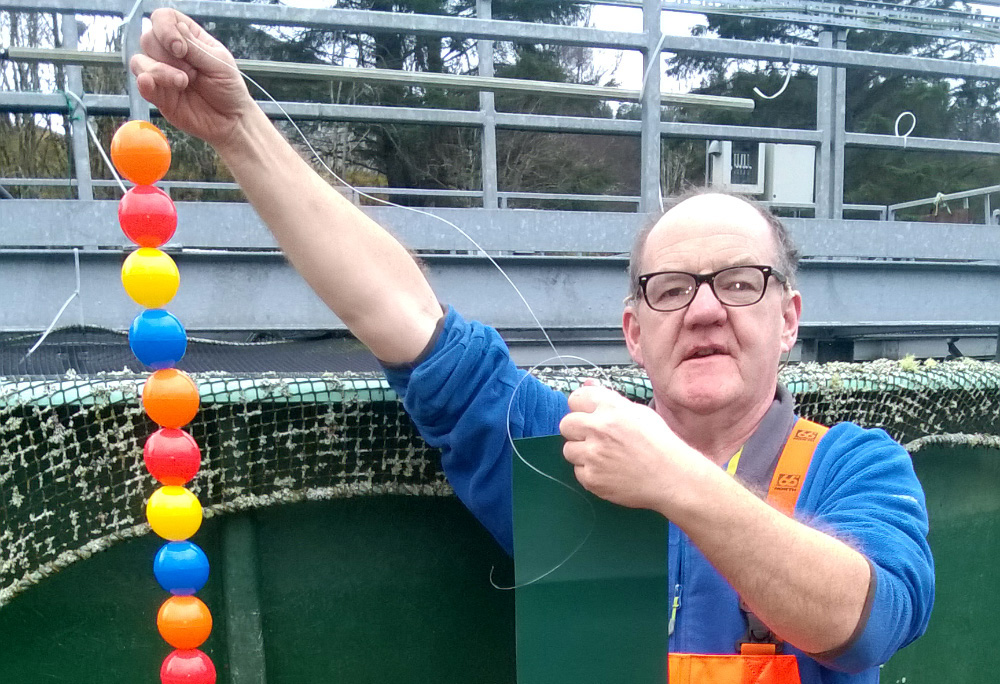
Playthings for young salmon

Like every sea farm, Loch Duart has had its lessons to learn. There were several escapes during the early years, the result of storm damage and seal attacks, which have required improvements to moorings and net materials and construction.

Vulnerability to human activities and nature is unavoidable. This was underlined in 2009 when a massive oil spill in Loch Carnan resulted in the loss of close to one million fish and in 2014 when a giant shoal of jellyfish got through nets in Loch Maddy, leading to the death of 300,000 young salmon.

Seal predation caused significant losses for a number of years, especially as the seal population grew, but, where sea currents and pen shape allow, a box-style anti-predator net is deployed. This has had the unexpected secondary effect of creating a safe haven for sea life – especially small mackerel, saithe and herring, which can now be seen in the predator-free areas created by the double-netting system.

Fin nipping by young fish, the result of boredom and bullying in hatchery tanks, has threatened the quality of life of the salmon population and is being solved by the development of artificial reefs and playthings. Farmers both at sea and on land refer to this as ‘environment enrichment’.

The company entered the smoked salmon market by acquiring the Salar Smokehouse on South Uist in the Outer Hebridesin 2014 the smokehouse was returned to local ownership.

== Markets ==
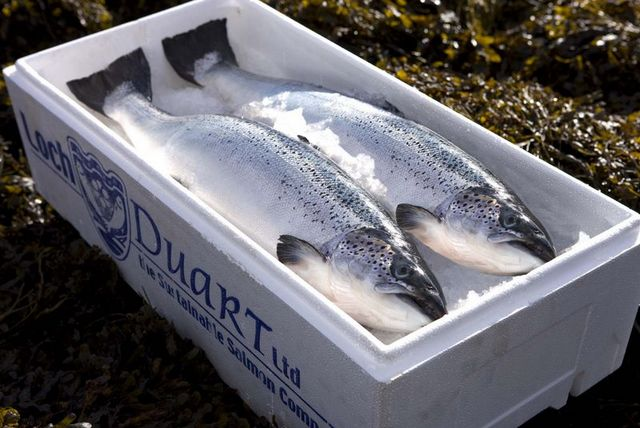
A Loch Duart salmon box

The company exports over 60% of its production to France where it maintains its own office, the US via Cleanfish Inc, the San Francisco–based distributor which has made provenance and quality its major issues, Italy, Germany, Switzerland, Holland, Belgium, Austria, Spain, Dubai, Singapore and Hong Kong. Strand Foods, an LA-based company also distributes Loch Duart Salmon.

Loch Duart has achieved the unusual feat of establishing a primary (and unprocessed) food product – whole fresh salmon – as a premium international brand*. Celebrity and Michelin-starred chefs, such as Gordon Ramsay, Raymond Blanc and Rick Stein, have featured the Loch Duart brand on their menus. Loch Duart salmon was served at the dinner at Buckingham Palace following the Royal Wedding in 2011 and at the Queens’ Jubilee Luncheon in the City of London.

In 2014, the company announced a deal to sell waste products to a London-based nutrition company.
