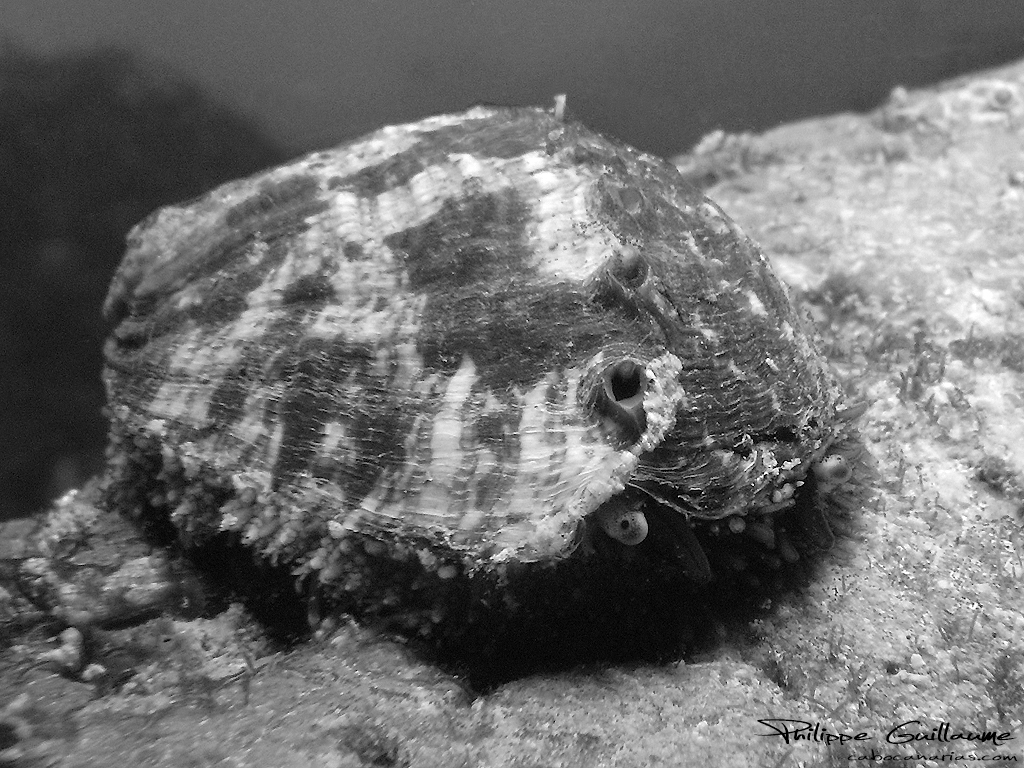
- Black and white underwater photo of Haliotis tuberculata coccinea showing its tentacles extended

Conservation status
- Vulnerable (IUCN 3.1)

Scientific classification
- Kingdom: Animalia
- Phylum: Mollusca
- Class: Gastropoda
- Subclass: Vetigastropoda
- Order: Lepetellida
- Family: Haliotidae
- Genus: Haliotis
- Species: H. tuberculata

Binomial name
- Haliotis tuberculata Linnaeus, 1758

Subspecies
- Haliotis tuberculata coccinea Reeve, 1846; Haliotis tuberculata fernandesi Owen, Grace, & Afonso; Haliotis tuberculata marmorata Linnaeus, 1758; Haliotis tuberculata tuberculata Linnaeus, 1758

Synonyms
- Haliotis adriatica Nardo, 1847; Haliotis canariensis F. Nordsieck, 1975; Haliotis coccinea Reeve, 1846; Haliotis lamellosa Lamarck, 1822; Haliotis lamellosa var. auriculata Monterosato, 1888; Haliotis lamellosa var. marmorata Pallary, 1900; Haliotis lamellosa var. planata Monterosato, 1888; Haliotis lamellosa var. producta Monterosato, 1888; Haliotis lamellosa var. rubra Pallary, 1900; Haliotis lamellosa var. viridis Pallary, 1900; Haliotis marmorata Costa O.G., 1829; Haliotis reticulata var. bisundata Monterosato, 1884; Haliotis speciosa Reeve, 1846; Haliotis tuberculata canariensis F. Nordsieck, 1975; Haliotis tuberculata coccinea Reeve, 1846; Haliotis tuberculata lamellosa Lamarck, 1822; Haliotis zealandica Reeve, 1846

= Green ormer =

Species of gastropod

The green ormer (Haliotis tuberculata) is a northeast Atlantic and Mediterranean species of sea snail, a coastal marine gastropod mollusc in the family Haliotidae, the abalone or ormer snails.

The flesh of the green ormer is prized as a delicacy, and this has led to a decline in its population in some areas.

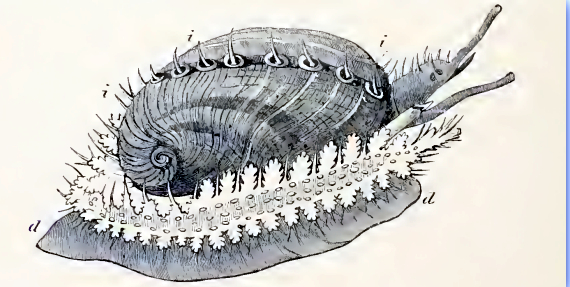
Drawing of a live specimen of Haliotis tuberculata; right side view: d, foot; i, tentacular process of the mantle, passing through the shell-foramina

== Taxonomy ==
Haliotis barbouri Foster, 1946 is a synonym for Haliotis varia.

According to the World Register of Marine Species (WoRMS) the following subspecies are recognized:

- Haliotis tuberculata coccinea Reeve, 1846 (synonyms: Haliotis canariensis F. Nordsieck, 1975; Haliotis coccinea Reeve, 1846; Haliotis zealandica Reeve, 1846)
- Haliotis tuberculata fernandesi Owen, Grace, & Afonso
- Haliotis tuberculata marmorata Linnaeus, 1758
- Haliotis tuberculata tuberculata Linnaeus, 1758 (synonyms: Haliotis aquatilis Reeve, 1846; Haliotis incisa Reeve, 1846; Haliotis janus Reeve, 1846; Haliotis japonica Reeve, 1846; Haliotis lamellosa Lamarck, 1822; Haliotis lamellosa var. secernenda Monterosato, 1877; Haliotis lucida Requien, 1848; Haliotis pellucida von Salis, 1793; Haliotis reticulata Reeve, 1846; Haliotis rugosa Reeve, 1846 (invalid: junior homonym of Haliotis rugosa Lamarck, 1822); Haliotis striata Linnaeus, 1758; Haliotis tuberculata lamellosa Lamarck, 1822; Haliotis tuberculata var. bisundata Monterosato, 1884; Haliotis vulgaris da Costa, 1778)

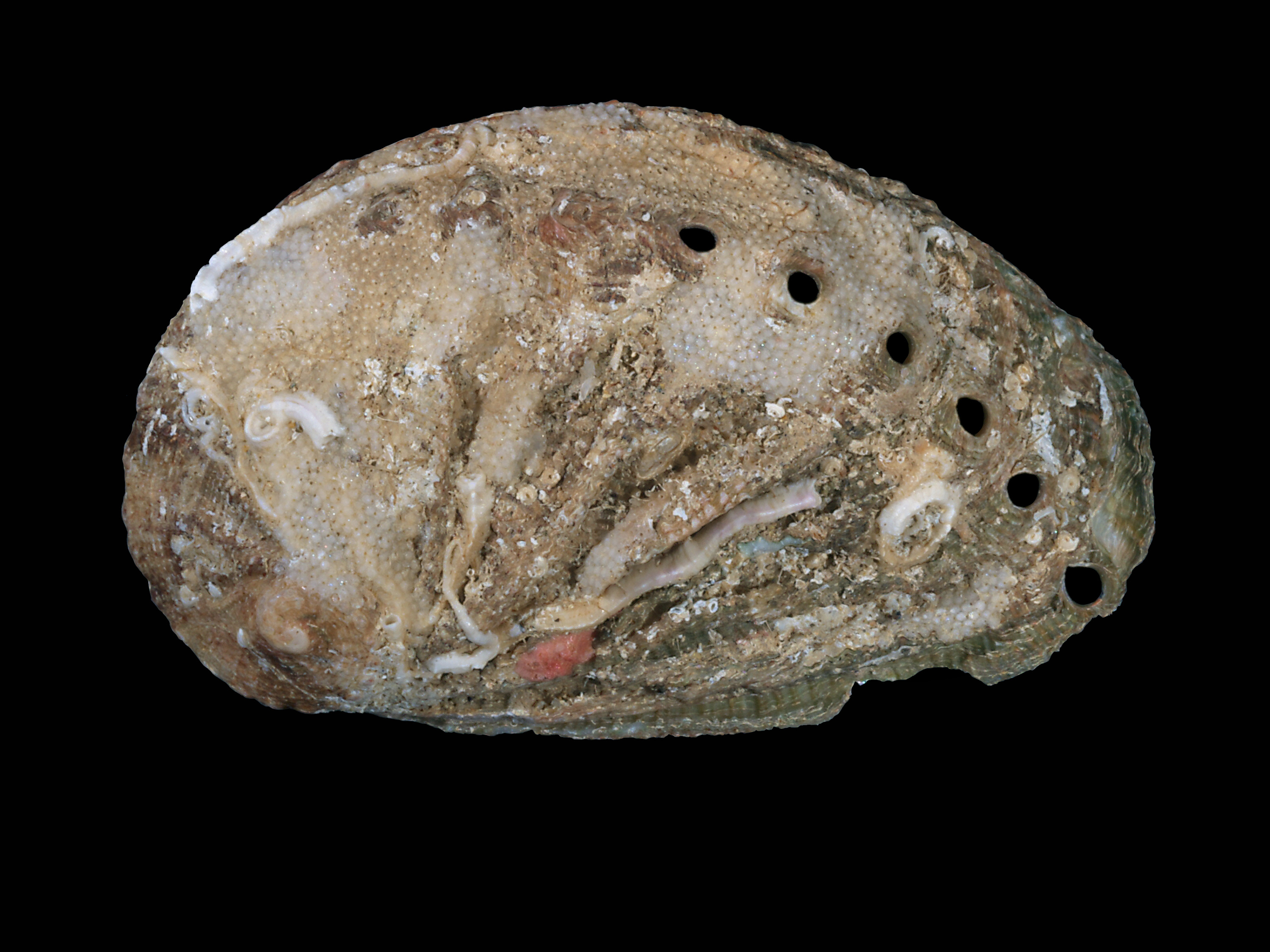
A shell of Haliotis tuberculata

== Shell description ==
The shell of this species grows as large as 10 cm (3.9 in) in length and 6.5 cm (2.6 in) in width. This flattened, oval shell is an ear-shaped spiral with a mottled outer surface. At the bottom margin of the shell, there is a curving row of five to seven slightly raised respiratory apertures, through which the mantle extends with short, exhalant siphons. As the animal and the shell grow, new holes are formed and the older holes are sealed off. These holes collectively make up what is known as the selenizone, which forms as the shell grows. The inner surface of the shell has a thick layer of iridescent mother-of-pearl.

The large and muscular foot has numerous tentacles at the epipodium (the lateral grooves between the foot and the mantle).

== Distribution ==
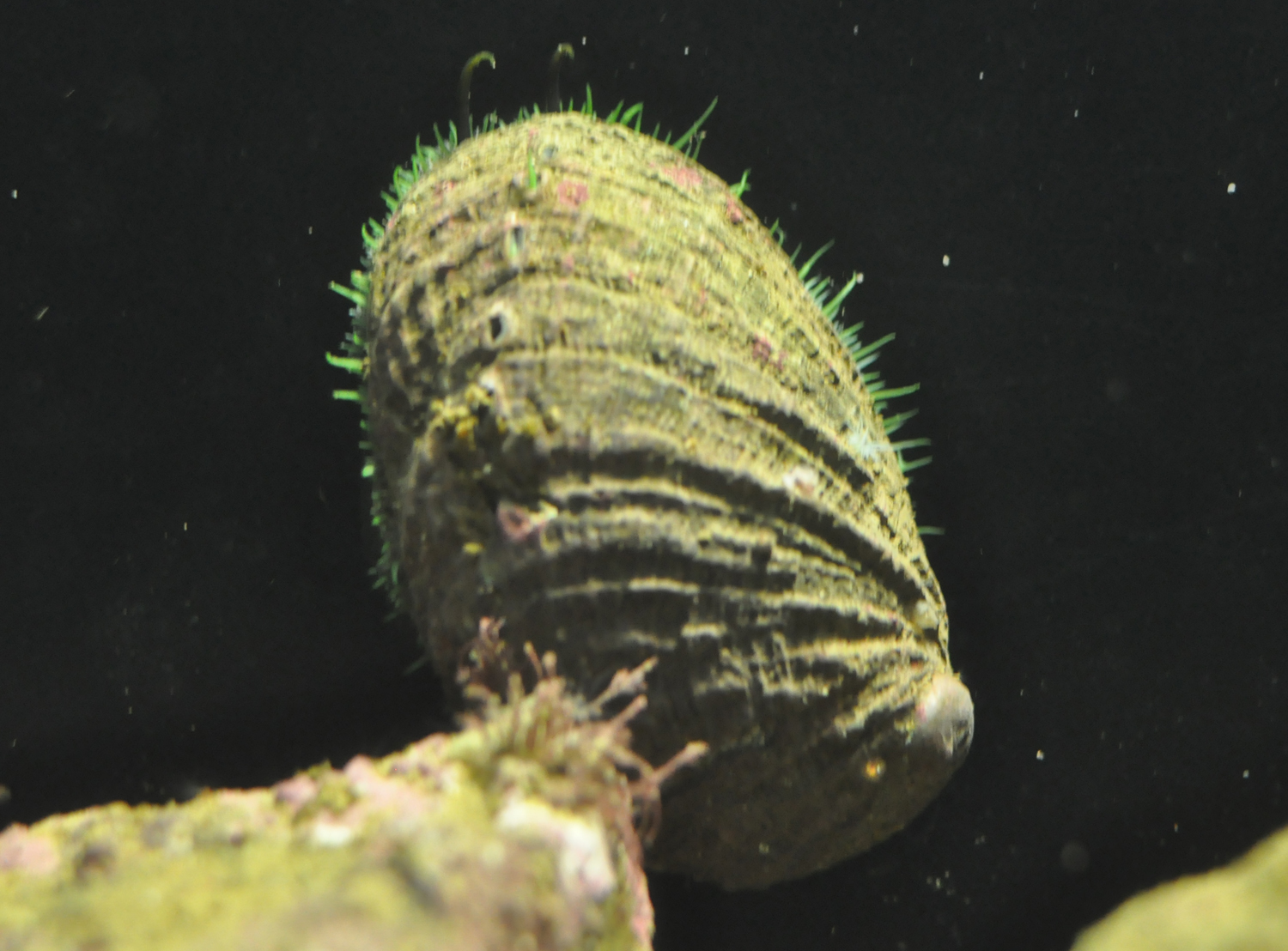
A Green ormer in captivity.

This species occurs on rocky shores in European waters from the Mediterranean Sea as far north as the Channel Islands; elsewhere in the Atlantic Ocean it occurs throughout Macaronesia and West Africa.

== Feeding habits ==
The green ormer grazes on algae, especially sea lettuce. It breeds in summer, via external fertilisation.

== Human use ==
=== In the Channel Islands ===
Ormers are considered a great delicacy in the Channel Islands. Overfishing has led to a dramatic depletion in numbers since the latter half of the 19th century.

"Ormering" is now strictly regulated in order to preserve stocks. The gathering of ormers is now restricted to a number of "ormering tides", from January 1 to April 30, which occur on the full or new moon and two days following that. No ormers may be taken from the beach that are under 80 mm in shell length (90 mm in Jersey). Gatherers are not allowed to wear wetsuits or even put their heads underwater. Any breach of these laws is a criminal offence which can lead to a fine of up to £5,000 or six months in prison.

The demand for ormers is such that they led to the world's first underwater arrest, when a Mr. Kempthorne-Leigh of Guernsey was illegally diving for ormers, and was arrested by a police officer in full diving gear.
