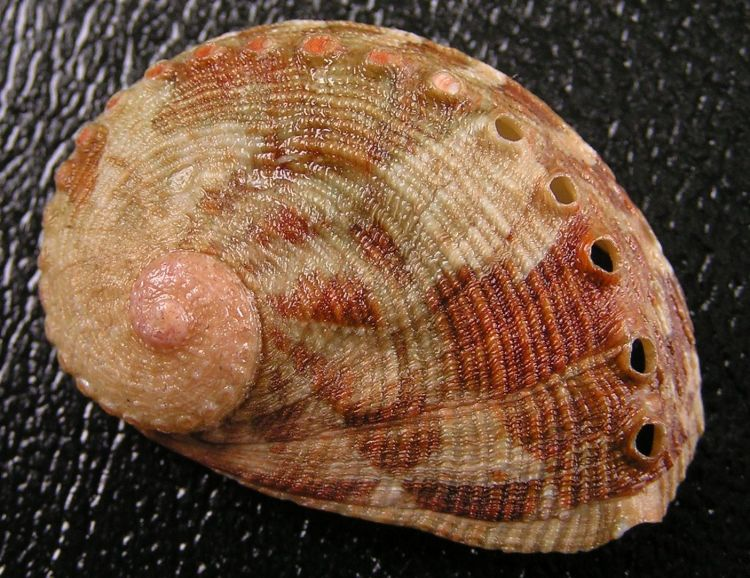
- Dorsal view of a shell of H. coccoradiata

Conservation status
- Least Concern (IUCN 3.1)

Scientific classification
- Kingdom: Animalia
- Phylum: Mollusca
- Class: Gastropoda
- Subclass: Vetigastropoda
- Order: Lepetellida
- Family: Haliotidae
- Genus: Haliotis
- Species: H. coccoradiata

Binomial name
- Haliotis coccoradiata Reeve, 1846

Synonyms
- Haliotis (Haliotis) coccoradiata Reeve, 1846; Notohaliotis coccoradiatus (Reeve, 1846)

= Haliotis coccoradiata =

Species of gastropod

Haliotis coccoradiata, common name the reddish-rayed abalone, is a species of sea snail, a marine gastropod mollusk in the family Haliotidae, the abalones.

== Description ==
The size of the shell varies between 30 mm and 75 mm. "The rather thin, depressed shell has an oval shape. The distance of the apex from the margin measures about one-sixth the length of the shell. This shell is spirally striate, decussated by closer, finer growth-striae. The six perforations are nearly circular. They are separated by spaces about as wide as the holes. The color pattern of the shell is yellowish or olive, with irregular radiating stripes of vivid scarlet. The shell is rather small with a right margin decidedly less convex than the left. The upper surface is depressed, flattened, and has a spiral depression around the middle of the body whorl. The shell is radiately striped with scarlet, and the closed perforations are scarlet. The spire is pink. The surface has numerous unequal spiral threads, decussated by distinct, close growth-striae. There are also inconspicuous short folds radiating from the suture on the earlier portion of the body whorl, and just outside the median spiral depression on the body. The inner surface is bright silvery, with green and red reflections. The nacre has spiral folds. The columellar plate is flat but rather narrow, obliquely subtruncate at its base. The cavity of the spire is visible."

== Distribution ==
This marine species is endemic to Australia and occurs off New South Wales, Queensland, South Australia, Tasmania and Victoria.

== See also ==
- List of marine animals of Australia (temperate waters)
