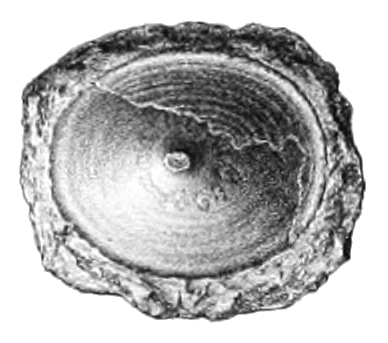
- Drawing of dorsal view of the shell of Pilina solarium. Head region is (probably) on the left.

Scientific classification
- Domain: Eukaryota
- Kingdom: Animalia
- Phylum: Mollusca
- Class: Monoplacophora
- Order: Tryblidiida
- Family: †Tryblidiidae
- Genus: †Pilina
- Species: †P. solarium

Binomial name
- †Pilina solarium (Lindström, 1884)

Synonyms
- Palaeacmaea solarium Lindström, 1884

= Pilina solarium =

Pilina solarium Temporal range: Silurian

Species of mollusc (fossil)

Pilina solarium is an extinct species of a paleozoic Silurian monoplacophoran. It was first named as Palaeacmaea solarium and described by Gustaf Lindström from Silurian of Gotland in Sweden in 1884.

Drawing of a lateral view (without detailed description) of the shell of Pilina solarium.

== Shell description ==
The shell is patelliform and regularly acuminate. The apex is nearly median or slightly anterior. The outline of the shell is oblongate. The outside of the shell is smooth, only concentrically wrinkled at regular distances by larger elevated ridges, the interstices between them being finely striated by parallel lines. Interiorly there is around the apex a narrow circle of detached muscular scars, visible on the nucleus.

The length of the shell is 6 mm, width 4 mm and the height of the shell is 3 mm.

== Distribution ==
Gustaf Lindström have found two specimens in the red, conchiferous limestone of Sandarfve kulle.
