= Helcionopsis subcarinata =

Helcionopsis subcarinata Temporal range: Lower Silurian

Scientific classification
- Domain: Eukaryota
- Kingdom: Animalia
- Phylum: Mollusca
- Class: Monoplacophora
- Order: Tryblidiida
- Family: †Tryblidiidae
- Genus: †Helcionopsis
- Species: †H. subcarinata

Binomial name
- †Helcionopsis subcarinata Ulrich & Scofield, 1897

Species of mollusc (fossil)

Helcionopsis subcarinata is an extinct species of paleozoic monoplacophoran in the family Tryblidiidae.

== Shell description ==
The shell is small and subovate in outline. The anterior and posterior margins are subequal and sharply rounded in the middle. In the cast the apex is depressed, small and not quite marginal. An obtuse carination extends across the length of the shell. The surface of cast shows remains of very fine radiating lines, that are scarcely visible without a magnifier, and a few obscure lines of growth.

The length of the shell is 10 mm, width 8 mm and the height of the shell is 3.5 mm. The height of the apex is 1.5 mm.

Ulrich and Scofield collected only two specimens of this species. Both are casts and show impressions of the rostral muscles. One exhibits besides a series of muscular scars similar to those of Tryblidium. They stated: "The lines are converging from them towards the apex are a peculiar feature, though probably of the nature of progressive tracts."

== Distribution ==
Trenton group, Clitambonites bed, Goodhue County, Minnesota.
