= Frodospira cochleata =

Frodospira cochleata Temporal range: Silurian

Scientific classification
- Kingdom: Animalia
- Phylum: Mollusca
- Class: Gastropoda
- Family: †Lophospiridae
- Genus: †Frodospira
- Species: †F. cochleata

Binomial name
- †Frodospira cochleata (Lindström, 1884)

Synonyms
- Lophospira cochleata (Lindström, 1884); Murchisonia cochleata (Lindström, 1884)

Species of gastropod

Frodospira cochleata is a species of extinct sea snail in the family Lophospiridae. Fossil specimens from 422.9 and 421.3 million years ago have been found in Sweden at Grogarnsberget, Hemse, and Sandarve kulle, in a hill about a kilometer north of Fardhem Church. A species of epifaunal filter feeder, it had a slender, turriculate shell consisting of twelve to thirteen whorls.
