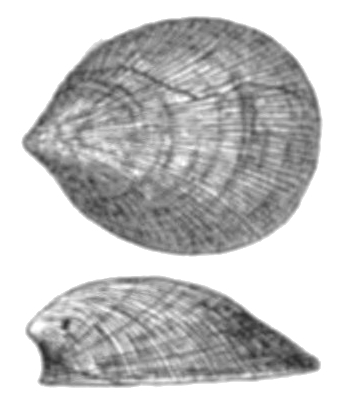
- Drawing of dorsal view and lateral view of Helcionopsis striata. Head region is on the left.

Scientific classification
- Domain: Eukaryota
- Kingdom: Animalia
- Phylum: Mollusca
- Class: Monoplacophora
- Order: Tryblidiida
- Family: †Tryblidiidae
- Genus: †Helcionopsis
- Species: †H. striata

Binomial name
- †Helcionopsis striata Ulrich, 1897

= Helcionopsis striata =

Helcionopsis striata Temporal range: Lower Silurian

Species of mollusc (fossil)

Helcionopsis striata is an extinct species of paleozoic monoplacophoran in the family Tryblidiidae.

== Shell description ==
The shell is rather strongly convex, acuminate-ovate in outline, broadly and regularly rounded behind, pointed in front where the apex projects slightly beyond the margin of the aperture. The apex is incurved. The surface is marked by distinct, rounded, radiating lines, which in the outer half maintain an approximately equal size through bifurcation. There are about ten lines in 5 mm. The whole surface is with very fine concentric lines. Irregular wrinkles are marking stages of growth at intervals of 1 to 3 mm.

The length of the shell is 24.5 mm, width 19 mm and the height of the shell is 4.5 mm.

This species is closely related to the Upper Silurian Helcionopsis radiatum, which is a little more convex, the anterior outline blunter and the apex more incurved.

== Distribution ==
It is rare in the upper beds of the Cincinnati formation, Marion County, Kentucky. Also, though of smaller size in the Loraine group at Cincinnati, Ohio.
