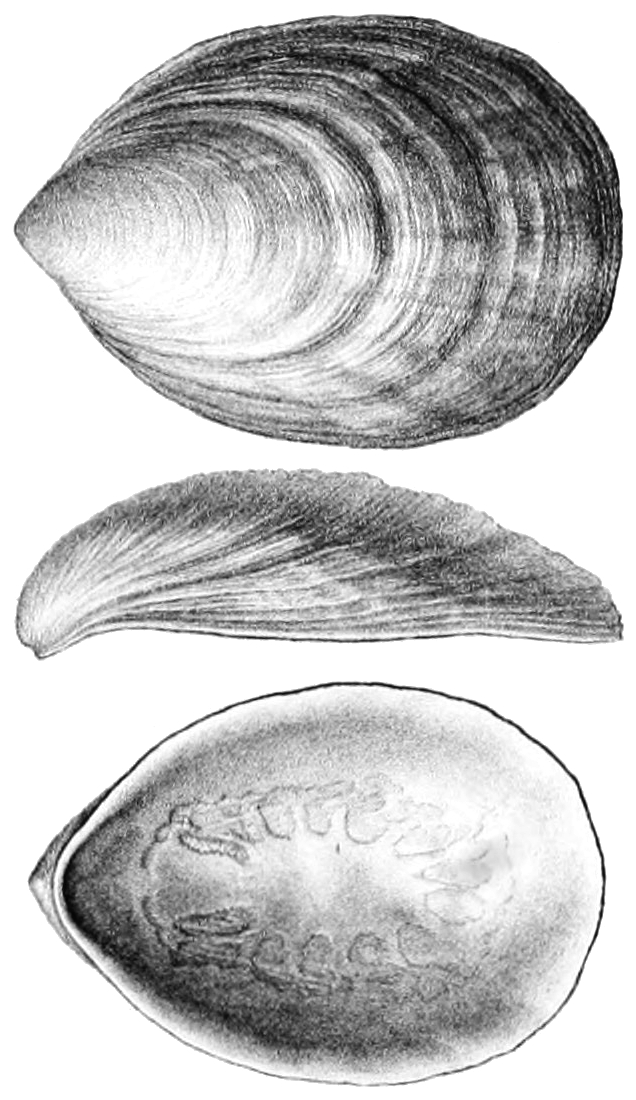
- Drawing of the shell of Pilina unguis. Head region is on the left.

Scientific classification
- Domain: Eukaryota
- Kingdom: Animalia
- Phylum: Mollusca
- Class: Monoplacophora
- Order: Tryblidiida
- Family: †Tryblidiidae
- Genus: †Pilina
- Species: †P. unguis

Binomial name
- †Pilina unguis (Lindström, 1880)

Synonyms
- Tryblidium unguis Lindström, 1880

= Pilina unguis =

Pilina unguis Temporal range: Silurian

Species of mollusc (fossil)

Pilina unguis is an extinct species of Paleozoic Silurian monoplacophoran. It was first named as Tryblidium unguis and described by Gustaf Lindström in Latin from the Silurian deposits of Gotland in Sweden, in 1880.

== Shell description ==
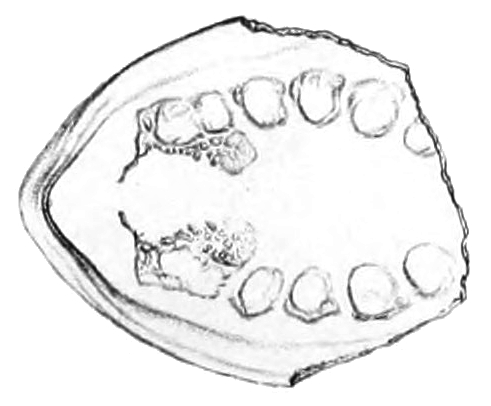
Drawing of the ventral view of the fragment of the shell of Pilina unguis showing the muscle scars

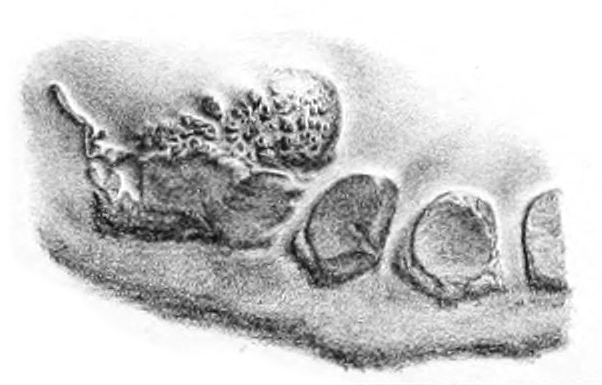
Drawing of the ventral view of the fragment of the shell of Pilina unguis shows details of the muscle scars

The length of the shell is 59–67 mm, width 47–51 mm and the height of the shell is 15–16 mm. With its shell size up to 67 mm was at least twice larger than any recent known living monoplacophoran species.

The shell has an obovate outline, anteriorly acuminate, posteriorly expanded, with the greatest width somewhat behind the median, transverse axis of the shell. It is regularly and moderately convex, being the most elevated near the median transverse axis.

The apex is close to the anterior margin and only very little prominent. The surface of the shell is covered with thread-fine ornamental lines parallel to the regular concentric lines of growth, somewhat interrupted by deeper sulci. It is generally even, excepting some wavy, irregular, shallow, longitudinal furrows.

The aperture is oval with comparatively thin margins, somewhat reflexed outwards. When seen from the side it forms a moderately elevated arch, being highest near the median line of the shell. The central space of the interior surface is surrounded by an oval ring of six pairs of muscular scars, open anteriorly. The posterior ones are narrow and elongate, the middle ones are transversally broad and much enlarged towards the margin of the shell. The surface of these pairs is smooth or only partially scrobiculated. The uppermost pair is more complicated and consists, as in the kindred species, of a more shallow, elongated interior portion, and of a larger exterior one, from the inner corner of which there projects a narrow sinuous groove, directed obliquely upwards and leaving a small, smooth space between itself and the opposite similar one. The lower, interior part of this upper, muscular scar is pearshaped, wide below, with a narrow, stalklike neck upwards and its surface is finely reticulated by shallow pits and intervening ridges. Some dark, narrow streaks are directed from the enclosed central space of the shell towards the interstices between the muscular scars. The whole central part of the shell inside the scars and to their outer edges is of dark color, while the outer border is lighter.

Near the apex there is on the inside a little oval depression or pit, which quite resembles a scar, filled up, as if there had been a foramen. Lindström considered this as the mark of the outlines of the initial shell, where now the apex is seen on the outside.

The shell is very thin, scarcely exceeding 0.5 mm in thickness and composed of thin, glossy lamellas, which are not perforated by any parasite.

== Distribution ==
This species has nearly the same geographical distribution as Tryblidium reticulatum. It has been found in several specimens in Fårö at Lauterhorn, Lansa and Norsholm, in Svarvare Huk, the canal near Westöös Änge in Hall, Väskinde, Häftingsklint, Lummelunda, Stora Vede in Follingbo, the limestone cliffs near Visby and Kyrkberget in Visby. It has only been found in the strata b and c or the upper and lower limestone and never in the shale of a. This is rather unexpected as the same species or at least a nearly allied variety, as mentioned above, has been found in the Lower Silurian strata of Estonia at Borkholm and also in the Upper Silurian at Koik, in the »Jördensche Schicht». These are only a little more elongate and not so enlarged as the specimens from Gotland.
