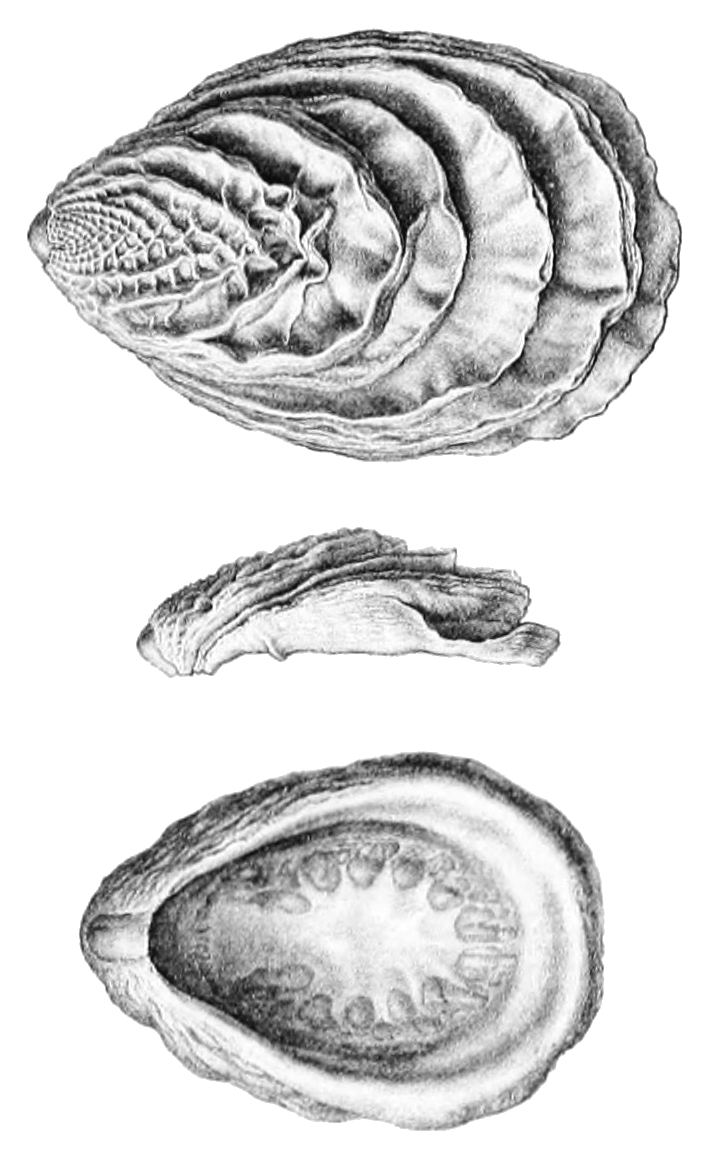
- Drawing of shells of Tryblidium reticulatum. Head region is on the left.

Scientific classification
- Domain: Eukaryota
- Kingdom: Animalia
- Phylum: Mollusca
- Class: Monoplacophora
- Order: Tryblidiida
- Family: †Tryblidiidae
- Genus: †Tryblidium; Lindström, 1880

Synonyms
- Triblidium

= Tryblidium =

Tryblidium Temporal range: Ordovician - Silurian

Extinct genus of molluscs

Tryblidium is a paleozoic genus of Ordovician and Silurian monoplacophorans.

The generic name comes from the Greek (τρυβλίον), which means patella.

== Species ==
Species in the genus Tryblidium include:

- Tryblidium acutum
- Tryblidium arctica
- Tryblidium erato
- Tryblidium eubule
- Tryblidium exserta
- Tryblidium hyrie
- Tryblidium modestum
- Tryblidium niobe
- Tryblidium nycteis
- Tryblidium ovale
- Tryblidium ovatum
- Tryblidium pileolum
- Tryblidium reticulatum
- Tryblidium rugosum
- Tryblidium simplex
- Tryblidium thorsteinssoni

== See also ==
- Triblidium esthonum is a synonym for Pilina esthonum.
- Tryblidium radiatum is a synonym for Helcionopsis radiatum.
- Tryblidium unguis is a synonym for Pilina unguis.
