= Genola =

Genola may refer to:

== Places ==
Italy

- Genola, Piedmont, a comune in the Province of Cuneo

United States

- Genola, Minnesota, a city in Morrison County
- Genola, Utah, a town in Utah County
