= Christoph von Lattermann =

Austrian Field marshal (1753–1835)

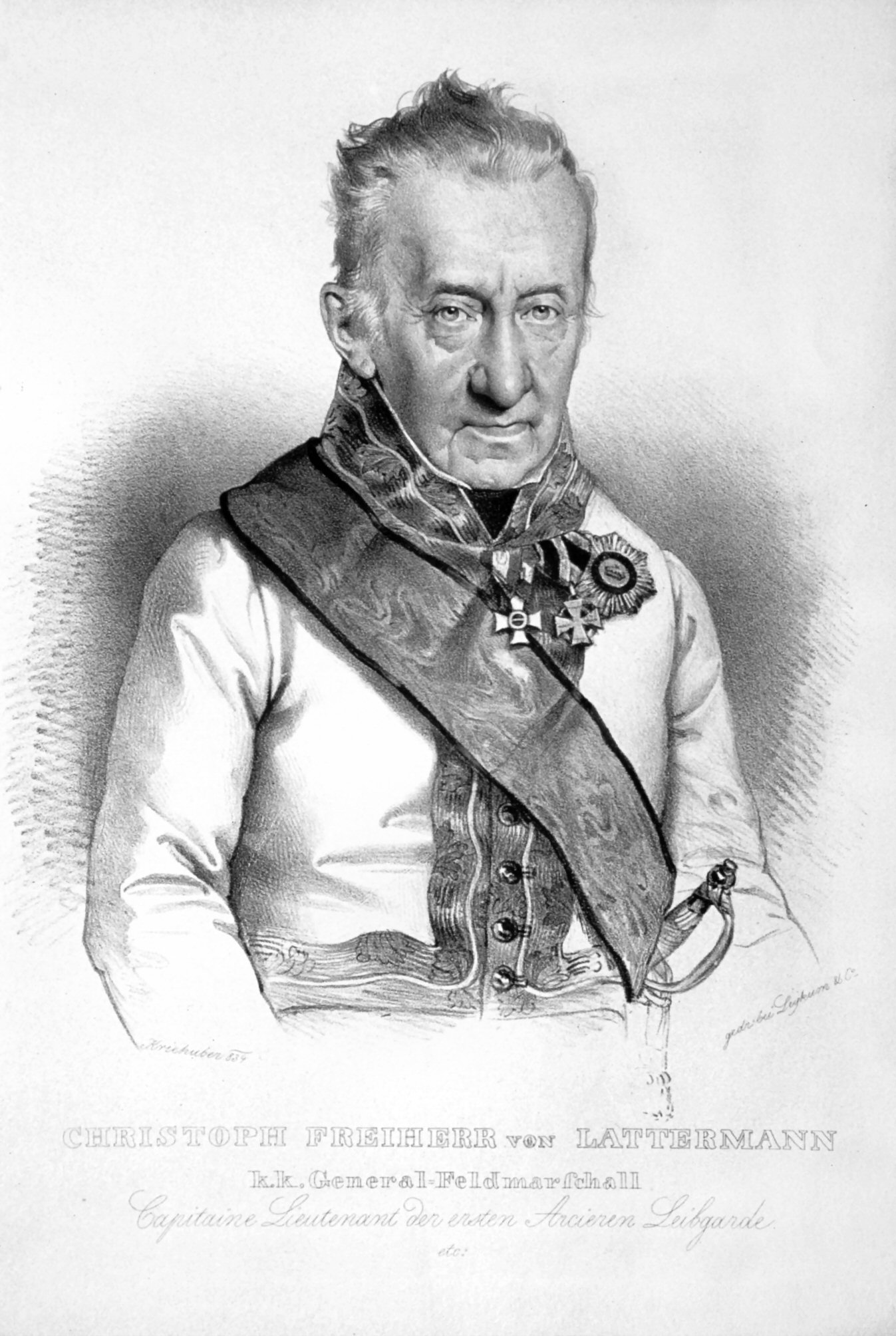
Christoph von Lattermann in 1834

Christoph Freiherr von Lattermann (14 July 1753 – 5 October 1835) was an Austrian Field marshal.

== Biography ==
Lattermann was born on 14 July 1753 in Olomouc. As the son of Feldmarschall-Leutnant Franz von Lattermann (1716–1806), he was destined for a military career and joined the Imperial army as a cadet at the age of 13. After ten years, he became a captain and distinguished himself in the Bavarian War of Succession. As a Major of a pontoon battalion during the Siege of Belgrade (1789), he managed to construct five bridges over the Danube and Sava rivers under adverse circumstances. In 1793 he fought with flying colors on the Rhine and in 1794 became a Colonel and commander of the Infantry Regiment No. 3. In 1797 he took over the command of a brigade in Italy as a Major General.

On 7 July 1799, he received the Knight's Cross of the Military Order of Maria Theresa for his performance at the Battle of Verona (1799). Under the command of Michael von Melas, on 4 November 1799, he led a division in the Battle of Genola. In the Battle of Marengo (June 1800), he was seriously wounded, to that extent that further service in the field became impossible.

In 1805 he retired from active service as a Feldmarschall-Leutnant. The same year, he was appointed interim military commander of Bohemia and in March 1809 of the Croatian Military Frontier. That year, he also became a member of the Hofkriegsrat and in 1810 of the Geheimrat.

In 1813, he was promoted to Feldzeugmeister (26 July) and commanded Austrian forces that invaded French Illyrian Provinces, becoming provisional civil and military governor of newly created Austrian Illyria (3 September).

In 1814 and 1818–1833 he took over the Presidium of the military Appellate court. In between, he was commanding general in Veneto. In 1826 he was appointed Lieutenant Captain of the Arcièren Life Guard.

With the title of Field Marshal, he retired in 1833 and died 2 years later in Vienna.

== Sources ==
- Costa, Heinrich (1855). "Biographie des k. k. Civil- und Militär- Gouverneurs Freiherrn von Lattermann". Mittheilungen des historischen Vereins für Krain. 10: 5–7.
- Haas, Arthur G. (1963). Metternich, Reorganization and Nationality, 1813-1818: A Story of Foresight and Frustration in the Rebuilding of the Austrian Empire. Wiesbaden: Franz Steiner Verlag.
