= Helcionopsis reticulatus =

Scientific classification
- Domain: Eukaryota
- Kingdom: Animalia
- Phylum: Mollusca
- Class: Monoplacophora
- Order: Tryblidiida
- Family: †Tryblidiidae
- Genus: †Helcionopsis
- Species: †H. reticulatus

Binomial name
- †Helcionopsis reticulatus Easton, 1943

Species of mollusc (fossil)

Helcionopsis reticulatus is an extinct species of paleozoic monoplacophoran in the family Tryblidiidae.
