= Gustav Lindstrom =

Gustav Lindstrom may refer to:

- Gustaf Lindström (1829–1901), Swedish paleontologist
- Gustav Lindström (born 1998), Swedish ice hockey player
