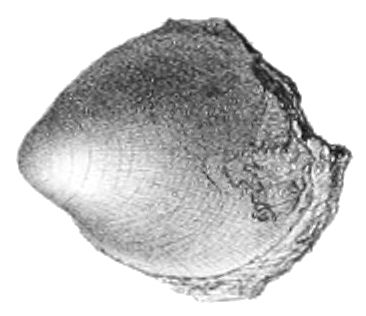
- Drawing of dorsal view of the shell of Helcionopsis radiatum. Head region is on the left.
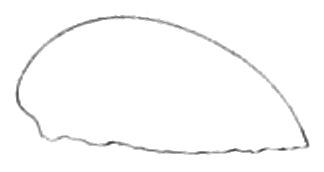
- Drawing of lateral view of the shell of Helcionopsis radiatum. Head region is on the left.

Scientific classification
- Domain: Eukaryota
- Kingdom: Animalia
- Phylum: Mollusca
- Class: Monoplacophora
- Order: Tryblidiida
- Family: †Tryblidiidae
- Genus: †Helcionopsis; Ulrich & Scofield, 1897

= Helcionopsis =

Helcionopsis Temporal range: Silurian

Helcionopsis is an extinct genus of paleozoic monoplacophoran in the family Tryblidiidae.

The generic name is from the external resemblance which the genus bear to the recent species of the genus Helcion in family Patellidae.

== Species ==
Species in the genus Helcionopsis include:

- Helcionopsis radiatum (Lindström, 1884)
- Helcionopsis reticulatus Easton, 1943
- Helcionopsis striata Ulrich, 1897
- Helcionopsis subcarinata Ulrich & Scofield, 1897

== Shell description ==
General form and position of apex is as in Tryblidium, from which Helcionopsis differ in having the surface marked by fine radiating striae. Muscular scars of this genus Helcionopsis unknown in 1897, when the genus was described.
