= Battle of Genola =

1799 battle of the War of the Second Coalition

- Part of War of the Second Coalition
Date	4 November 1799
Location	Genola, Piedmont, Italy 44°35′N 7°40′E
Result	Austrian victory

Belligerents
(Habsburg monarchy) Habsburg Austria	Republican France

Commanders and leaders
(Habsburg monarchy) Michael von Melas	(France) Jean Championnet

Units involved
(Habsburg monarchy) Army of Italy	(France) Army of Italy

Strength
29,000–34,000	33,498; 15,000 participated

Casualties and losses
2,400	7,600, 5 guns

War of the Second Coalition:
Italy
current battle
Napoleon in command
Napoleon not in command

The Battle of Genola or Battle of Fossano (4 November 1799) was a meeting engagement between a Habsburg Austrian army commanded by Michael von Melas and a Republican French army under Jean Étienne Championnet. Melas directed his troops with more skill and his army drove the French off the field, inflicting heavy losses. The War of the Second Coalition action represented the last major French effort in Italy during 1799. The municipality of Genola is located in the region of Piedmont in northwest Italy a distance of 27 kilometres (17 mi) north of Cuneo and 58 kilometres (36 mi) south of Turin.

Championnet became the army commander after Barthélemy Catherine Joubert's death in the French defeat at Novi in August. His aim was to keep the fortress of Cuneo under French control. In November, both Championnet and Melas advanced and their armies collided at Genola. The French were forced to retreat into the Alps, leaving Cuneo to be besieged and captured on 3 December 1799. The badly-fed and clothed French army was ravaged by a typhus epidemic during the winter; the disease claimed the life of Championnet and many others.

== Background ==
Their armies' defeats in Italy and Germany during 1799 weakened the French Directory and resulted in the Coup of 30 Prairial VII (18 June 1799). France's post-coup leaders sent Barthélémy Catherine Joubert to command the 40,713-man Army of Italy with orders to attack. Joubert was to be supported on his left by the Army of the Alps under Jean Étienne Championnet. Upon arrival, Joubert's generals advised him to wait for Championnet's troops to join them, but the new commander felt bound by his instructions to launch an immediate offensive. In the Battle of Novi on 15 August 1799, the Army of Italy was defeated by the larger Austro-Russian army under Alexander Suvorov and Joubert was killed. The Allies failed to pursue; the Austrians were more interested in besieging the Italian fortresses. Suvorov and the Russian corps were soon ordered to march to Switzerland, leaving 178,253 Austrian soldiers holding Italy. Jean Victor Marie Moreau reorganized the French army until Championnet could arrive to take over.

Meanwhile, Championnet marched from Grenoble around 8 August 1799 with 25,000 troops split into four groups. The northernmost column crossed the Little St Bernard Pass to threaten Aosta and Ivrea while the next column south traversed the Mont Cenis Pass to Susa in order to menace Turin. Championnet accompanied a column of 8,000–9,000 men that crossed the Col de Montgenèvre and moved southeast to Fossano via Pinerolo. The southernmost column marched over the Maddalena Pass (Col de l'Argentière) into the Valle Stura di Demonte in the direction of Cuneo. On 16 September Paul Grenier with 8,000 defeated 5,000 Austrians under Friedrich Heinrich von Gottesheim at Fossano, inflicting 1,000 casualties for the loss of 200 men. Two days later at Savigliano, 20,000 Austrians led by Michael von Melas fell on Grenier's column and beat him, inflicting 2,000 casualties on the French while losing only 400. The French lost both Fossano and Savigliano and fell back, the other columns retreating as well. The northern column under Guillaume Philibert Duhesme withdrew after being blocked by Fort Bard.

== Operations ==
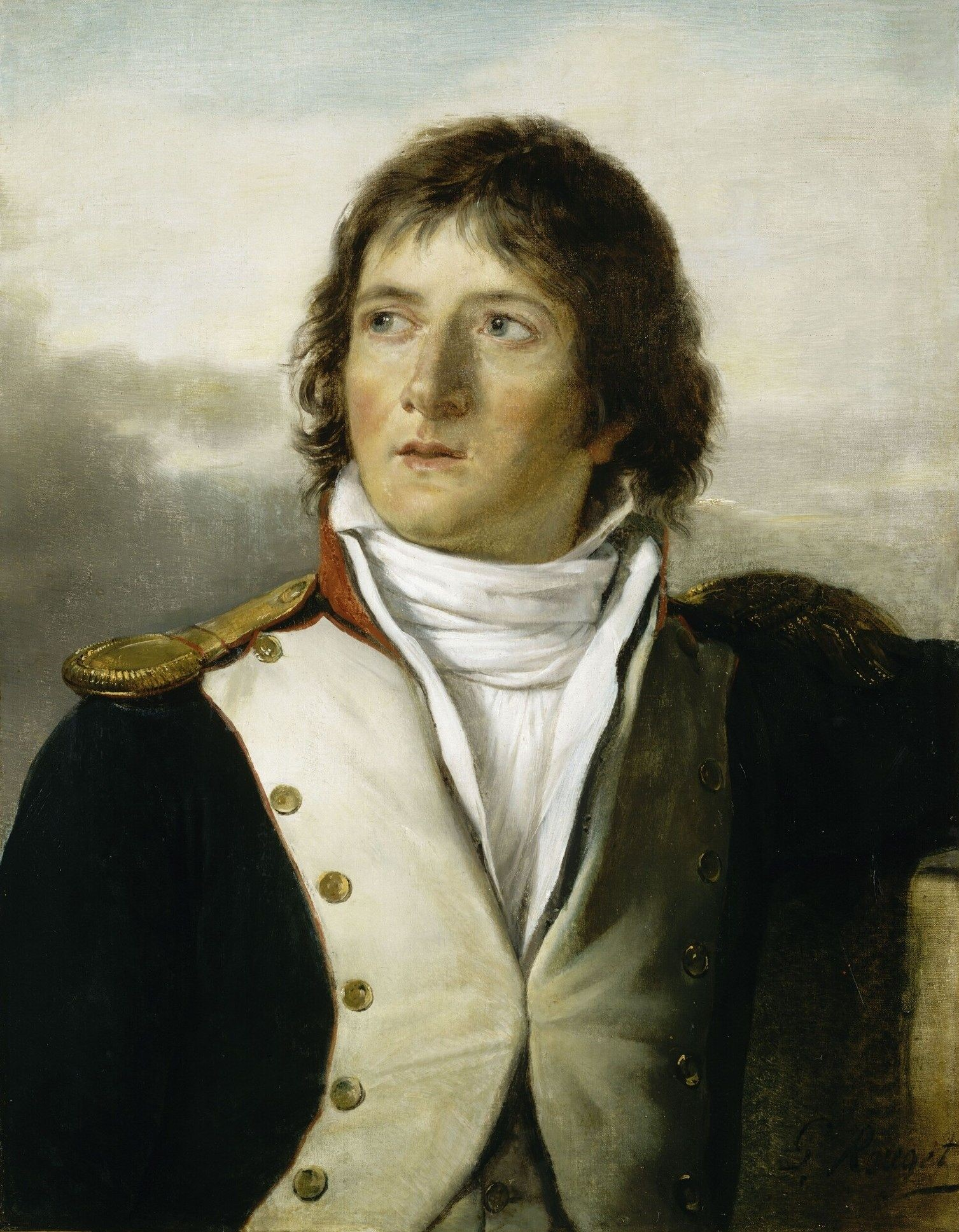
Laurent Saint-Cyr

Championnet assumed command of the Army of Italy from Moreau at Genoa on 22 September. The Army of the Alps was absorbed by its sister army at that time. Championnet wished to abandon Genoa in order to shorten the long line he had to defend, but the French government refused to allow it. There were 63,657 French troops available, but only 53,581 if garrisons are excluded. The right wing under Laurent Gouvion Saint-Cyr had 16,657 soldiers in the divisions of Jean Henri Dombrowski, Pierre Garnier de Laboissière, Sextius Alexandre François de Miollis and François Watrin. Championnet personally led the 15,215-strong center, consisting of the divisions of Louis Lemoine and Claude Perrin Victor at Mondovì. Grenier led the 19,615-man left wing near Cuneo, made up of his own and Duhesme's divisions plus a 2,056-strong reserve under André Calvin. Duhesme was also charged with holding the Little St Bernard and Mont Cenis passes. Opposing the French were Johann von Klenau who faced Genoa, Paul Kray in the Aosta valley and Melas who threatened Cuneo.

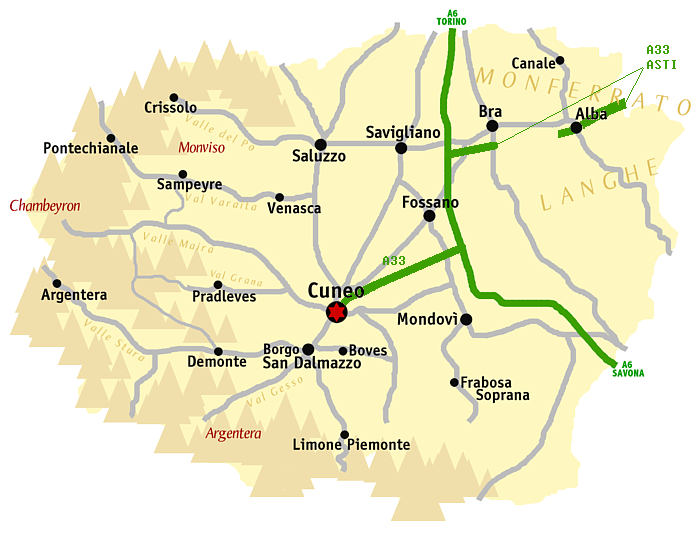
In Cuneo province, Genola is located at the three-way intersection south of Savigliano.

Saint-Cyr's wing successfully held its own against the Austrians near Genoa. Watrin with 7,000 troops beat Klenau with 5,000 on the 13th at Bracco, a village east of Sestri Levante. The French inflicted 1,200 casualties, mostly captured, on their foes while sustaining losses of 100. This was part of an operation that started on the 12th in which French troops from Torriglia pressed back Klenau's outposts in the mountains east of Genoa. After eight days, they withdrew into their previous lines. On 24 October 1799 Saint-Cyr defeated Andreas Karaczay in the Second Battle of Novi. Karaczay's 5,000 troops lost 300 killed and wounded while the French captured 1,000 men and four guns. The French lost 400 killed and wounded plus 800 captured out of 12,000. In the sequel, Saint-Cyr pushed threateningly to the north, so Kray was sent with a strong force including 2,800 cavalry and 25 artillery pieces to press him back. The French right wing commander pulled back to the heights behind Novi and refused to budge when Kray tried to maneuver him out of position. On 6 November in the Third Battle of Novi, Kray attacked the hills in four columns and fell into a clever ambush. The French troops made a fighting withdrawal, drawing the Austrians after them. Suddenly, Saint-Cyr's masked artillery opened up as Dombrowski's division bored in from the flank. The French drove the Austrians off the heights but Saint-Cyr was too prudent to pursue into the plain where the enemy's superior cavalry and artillery waited. The French sustained 400 casualties out of 11,000 men while inflicting a loss of 1,000 men and five guns on their 12,000 opponents.

Farther west there were clashes at Saluzzo and Pinerolo. On 16 October 1799 the divisions of Victor and François Muller attacked the Austrians at Beinette with serious losses on both sides. Finally, Melas gave up his attempted siege of Cuneo and pulled back. Lemoine's division was involved in actions at Mondovì on 27–28 October. On 31 October 1799, Melas with 15,000 soldiers drubbed Grenier with 7,000 at Centallo. The French suffered 1,000 casualties while the Austrians lost only 200 and captured four guns. However, the French gradually pressed forward toward Fossano. Duhesme fought an Austrian force at Pinerolo on 1 November and the next day the French captured Mondovì.

== Forces ==
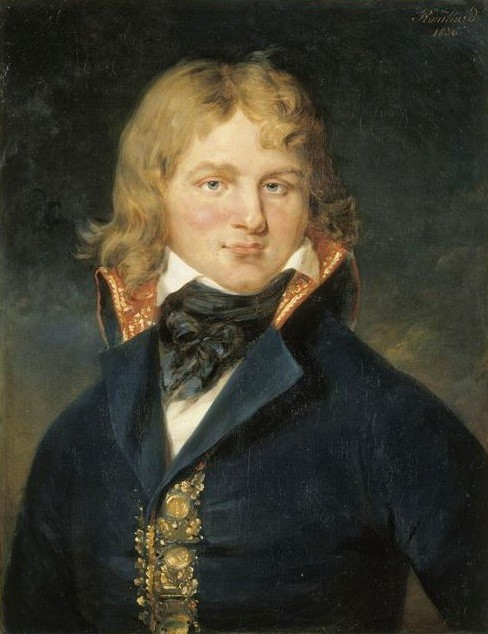
Jean Championnet

The French Army of Italy under Championnet and his chief of staff Louis Gabriel Suchet included the infantry divisions of Duhesme, Grenier, Lemoine and Victor and the cavalry division of Antoine Richepanse. Since Grenier was acting as left wing commander Muller led his division. Muller's 8,000-man division was made up of the 3rd, 8th and 17th Light Infantry Demi-brigades, the 10th, 31st, 40th, 47th, 104th and 106th Line Infantry Demi-brigades and 600 sabers from the 10th Hussars. The infantry brigadiers were Claude Clément, Jean Dominique Compans and Jean Davin while Julien Augustin Joseph Mermet led the cavalry. Duhesme's 8000-strong division comprised the 7th and 28th Light and the 29th, 80th, 87th and 107th Line Infantry Demi-brigades and the 11th Hussars. The brigade commanders were Georges Kister, Joseph Mathurin Fidele Lesuire and Claude-François Malet.

Victor's 8,469-man division counted the 2nd Battalion of the 26th Light and the 26th, 33rd, 35th, 39th, 92nd, 93rd, 99th and 105th Line Infantry Demi-brigades. The brigadiers were Charles Louis Dieudonné Grandjean, Jean Louis Gaspard Josnet de Laviolais and Pierre Poinsot de Chansac. Lemoine's 7,829-strong division included the 5th Light and 17th Line Demi-brigades, the 34th Line under Philibert Fressinet, the 63rd Line under Gaspard Amédée Gardanne, the 74th Line under Bertrand Clausel and 114 detached hussars. The 20th Light under Jean-Mathieu Seras was not engaged nor was the 30th Line. Richepanse's 1,200 troopers were from the 1st, 14th and 21st Cavalry and the 2nd, 3rd, 9th and 14th Chasseurs à Cheval. The numbers listed above add up to 33,498 soldiers. A second source asserted that the Austrians enjoyed a numerical advantage, giving 20,000–25,000 for the French total, apparently excluding Lemoine. Two additional sources stated that only 15,000 French were engaged at Genola.

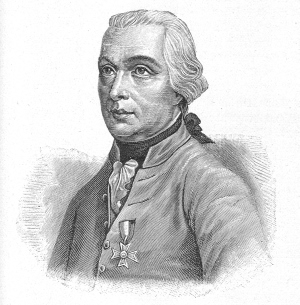
Michael von Melas

The Austrian army under Melas and his chief of staff Anton von Zach was composed of the infantry divisions of Peter Karl Ott von Bátorkéz, Anton Ferdinand Mittrowsky and Anton von Elsnitz, the cavalry division of Johann I Joseph, Prince of Liechtenstein, Gottesheim's vanguard and Hannibal Sommariva's independent brigade. Ott's 7,632-strong division was made up of brigades under Karl Philippi von Weidenfeld and Franz Xaver Johann von Auersperg. Weidenfeld's 3,404-man brigade included the Görschen, Hohenfeld, Neny, Pers, Pértussy and Weissenwolf Grenadier Battalions. Auersperg led 4,228 soldiers from full-strength Infantry Regiments Archduke Charles Nr. 3 and Stuart Nr. 18. Mittowsky's Division had only the 2,684-man brigade of Lelio Spannocchi, consisting of weak Infantry Regiments Reisky Nr. 13, Terzi Nr. 16 and Joseph Mittrowsky Nr. 40. Elsnitz commanded 8,010 men in the brigades of Karl von Adorján, Antoine-François-Armand Mignot de Bussy and Friedrich Joseph Anton von Bellegarde. Adorján directed 2,768 troops from Infantry Regiments ex-Kheul Nr. 10 and Alvinczi Nr. 19, Bussy led 1,467 men from Infantry Regiment Nádasdy Nr. 39 and Bellegarde had 3,775 soldiers from Infantry Regiments Gyulai Nr. 32 and Sztaray Nr. 33.

Liechtenstein led 3,488 troopers in the cavalry brigades of Johann Nobili and Nikolaus Joseph Palffy von Erdöd. Nobili supervised 1,765 sabers in Light Dragoon Regiments Archduke John Nr. 3 and Karaczay Nr. 4 while Palffy directed 1,723 sabers in Light Dragoon Regiments Wurttemberg Nr. 8 and Lobkowitz Nr. 10. Gottesheim's 4,665-man vanguard included Light Dragoon Regiment Kaiser Nr. 1 and Infantry Regiments ex-Huff Nr. 8 and Prince of Orange Nr. 15, a total of 843 horse and 3,822 foot. Sommariva's 2,756-strong brigade consisted of Hussar Regiment Archduke Joseph Anton Nr. 2, Light Dragoon Regiment Levenehr Nr. 14, Light Infantry Battalion ex-Otto Nr. 7 and the 1st Battalion of Grenz Infantry Regiment Szluiner Nr. 4, a total of 1,726 cavalry and 1,030 infantry. Franz Bögner led the artillery and Joseph Radetzky von Radetz led the engineers for a combined total of about 1,000 gunners and pioneers. Altogether, there are 30,235 men listed above. A second source listed 29,000 Austrians. A third source credited the Austrians with 34,000 troops including 6,000 cavalry. This total counted six battalions not listed above that were under Christoph von Lattermann.

== Battle ==
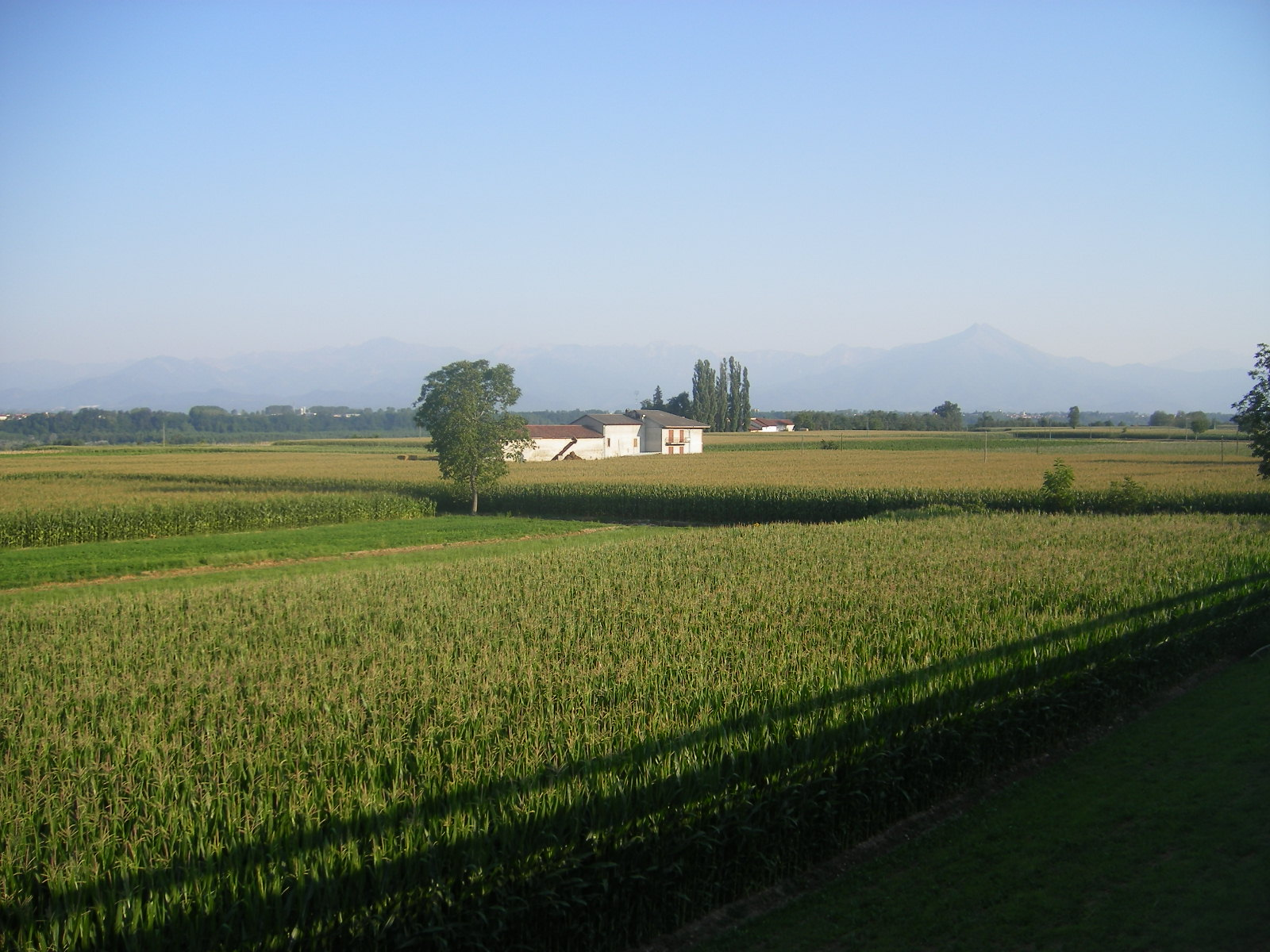
Countryside near Murazzo

On 3 November, Duhesme seized Saluzzo, Victor crossed the Stura River to take Murazzo and Carrù was occupied. Championnet decided to launch a major attack on his opponent the next day. Lemoine on the right at Carrù north of Mondovì was instructed to operate on the Austrian left flank while Victor on the right center moved against Fossano. Grenier with the left center was to attack east through Savigliano toward Marene. Duhesme was ordered to march from Pinerolo to Saluzzo in order to turn the Austrian right flank. On 4 November, the battle of Genola or Fossano was fought.

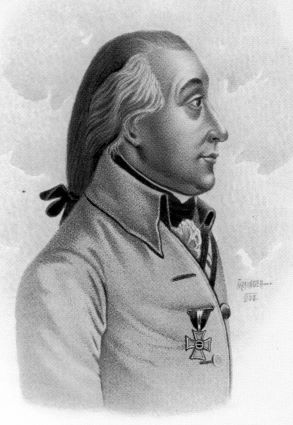
Peter Karl Ott

Championnet assumed that his opponent was about to pull back, but Melas had made up his mind to fight and had his army well concentrated. To guard the supply line from Turin, Melas directed Konrad Valentin von Kaim to shift Lattermann's troops to Racconigi in the north. The Austrian commander ordered Ott with the left flank division to march from Marene seize Savigliano. Mittrowsky with the center was also directed to advance on Savigliano. On the left, Elsnitz was directed to attack from Fossano toward Genola. Assisted by the Fossano garrison, Gottesheim would feint toward Murazzo and Maddelena. (Murazzo is southwest of Fossano on the west bank of the Stura while Morozzo is south of Fossano on the east bank.)

Both armies were in motion early in the day. The first contact occurred when the divisions of Ott and Grenier violently collided near Marene. The Austrian cavalry intervened and pushed the French back somewhat, but the battle still hung in the balance. Mittrowsky's troops appeared unexpectedly, tipping the balance and driving the French from Savigliano. On the other flank, Victor attacked Fossano as Elsnitz was repulsed three times from Genola. Richepanse launched a series of successful cavalry charges in support of Victor. General Adorján was killed at about this time. Mittrowsky moved from Savigliano to Genola and helped drive Victor's men from the town. Ott pursued Grenier's beaten division in a deeper envelopment of the French army toward Vottignasco. Championnet authorized Victor to retreat to Centallo. Gottesheim was unable to dislodge Victor's right wing near Murazzo, but Victor's left wing fell back to Ronchi, just north of Cuneo. By the end of the day the Austrian pursuit had reached a line running from Villafalletto on the west, Centallo in the center and Murazzo on the east.

Meanwhile, Duhesme marched from Saluzzo with 3,000 soldiers and belatedly arrived at Savigliano in the late afternoon. Melas assigned the brigades of Sommariva and Lattermann to face the threat. Blocked by more numerous enemies, Duhesme retreated to Saluzzo. That day Lemoine advanced to Bene Vagienna east of Fossano, but Melas ignored him and focused on crushing Grenier and Victor. On 5 November, the Austrian commander sent Ott against Ronchi where he captured 600 French soldiers. At Murazzo, Elsnitz and Gottesheim drove Victor's rear guard against the Stura, compelling 1,500 men to surrender and others to drown in attempting to swim the river. Grenier abandoned Fort Demonte and retreated toward the Col de Tende. The Austrian pursuit swept up another 1,500 demoralized Frenchmen as prisoners. Championnet gathered Lemoine's men and Victor's survivors at Mondovì, hoping to interfere with any attempt to besiege Cuneo. Followed by Lattermann, Duhesme withdrew far to the northwest at Oulx and Susa.

== Results ==
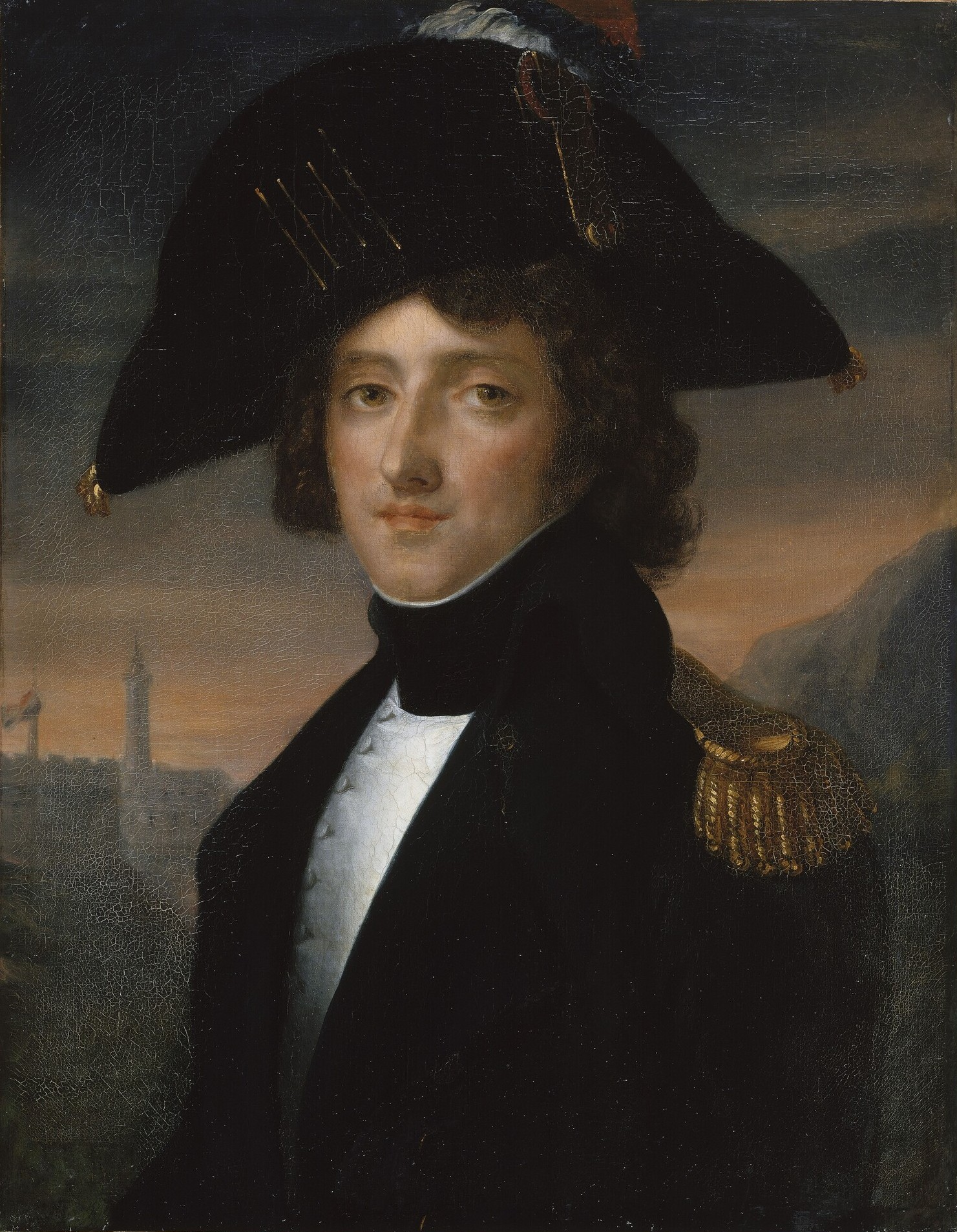
Louis-Gabriel Suchet

The French lost 3,400 killed and wounded plus 4,200 men and five guns captured. The Austrians sustained losses of 2,150 killed and wounded and 250 captured. Wishing to besiege Cuneo, Melas moved against the nearby French forces. On 10 November Ott drove Richepanse from Borgo San Dalmazzo back to Limone Piemonte. Melas ordered Liechtenstein and Mittrowski to attack Mondovì. On 13 November 1799, 14,000 Austrians attacked Championnet's 9,000 at Mondovì. Casualties were about even at about 500 on each side. Championnet pulled his troops back to Ormea and Garessio and set up his headquarters at Finale Ligure on the coast. On 15 November, the Austrians drove the French from Limone and over the Col de Tende. Having cleared the French from Piedmont, Melas directed Liechtenstein to lay siege to Cuneo on the 18th. The city was cut off from the waters of the Stura on 21 November and trenches were begun on the night of the 26th. On 2 December, the Austrian guns opened their bombardment, breaching the defenses and burning down many houses. On 3 December the garrison commander Clément surrendered the surviving 3,000 troops, 187 cannons and 14,000 cwt of gunpowder.

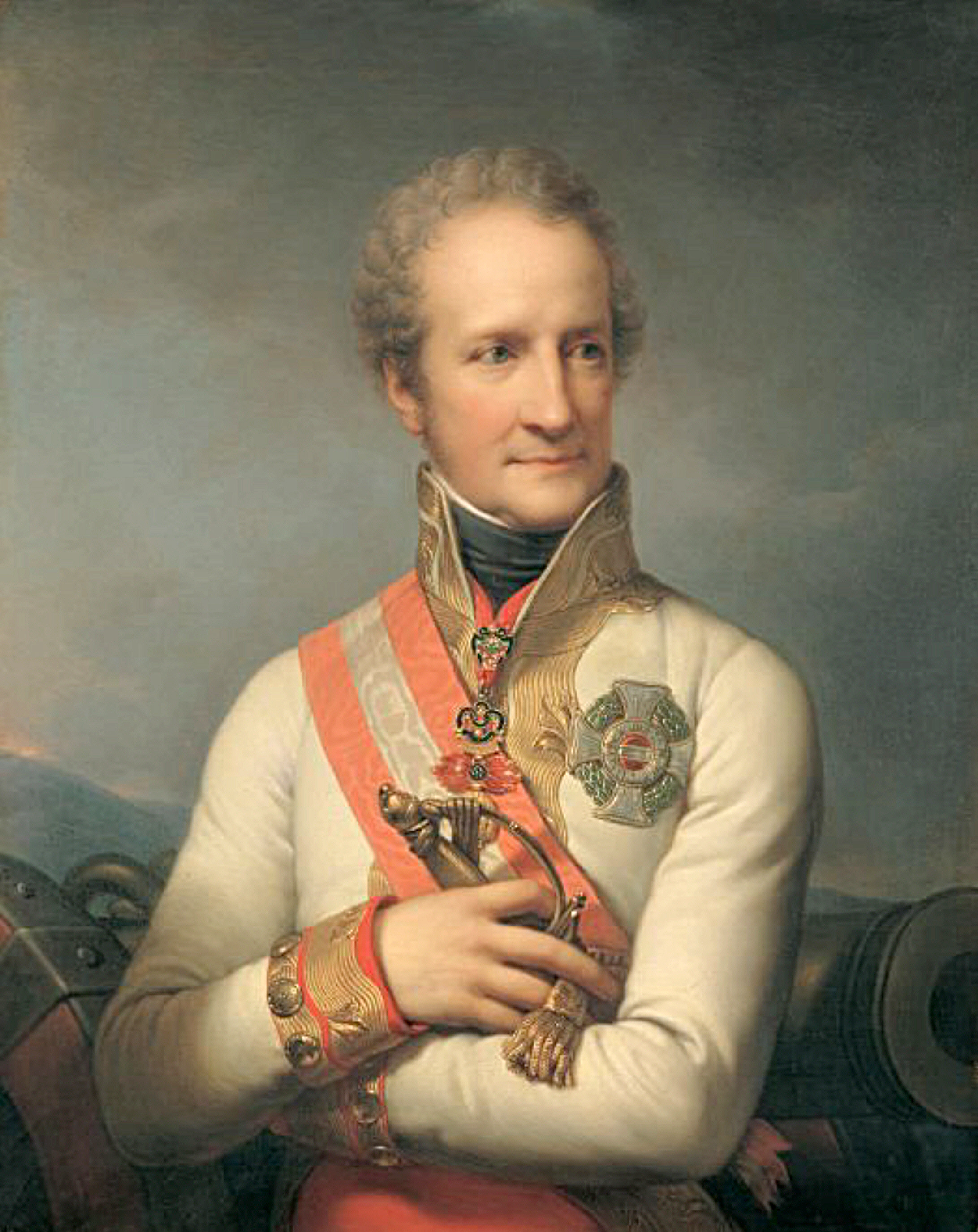
Prince Liechtenstein

After the battle, the Army of Italy was hemmed in between the crests of the Ligurian Alps on the north and the Ligurian Sea on the south. During the course of the war, the Italian Riviera had been denuded of supplies so provisions had to be shipped from France in order to sustain the army. The supply convoys were often held up by foul winds or British warships. On top of this, the soldiers had not been paid in five months and their clothing and shoes were worn out. In these conditions, many men deserted but soon the soldiers broke out in mutiny. In one incident, Championnet and Suchet were faced with 3,000 mutineers who had only received rations on six days out of the last thirty. They somehow convinced the soldiers to return to duty. The men of the Genoa garrison announced to Saint-Cyr that they were marching back to France. The general dissuaded them by pointing out that they would certainly starve to death on the long march along the Riviera. Fortunately, supply ships reached Genoa just in time. Watrin's division abandoned its positions, leaving only their officers and sous-officiers holding Bocchetta Pass. The men were only persuaded to stop by the news that the Genoa garrison had decided to remain; they got back before the Austrians could seize the pass. Championnet was in despair at the misery of his men.

On 31 December 1799, Championnet got news that the government accepted his resignation and appointed André Masséna to lead the Army of Italy. The following day he became sick and the senior general Jean-Antoine Marbot assumed temporary command. For a week, Championnet's illness did not seem particularly severe and he granted leave to Suchet on 3 January. However, he rapidly declined and died on 9 January 1800. The general was so impoverished that his staff had to pay for his burial at Antibes. Championnet was a victim of typhus, which had broken out in Nice in mid-October 1799. The disease was first seen in a military hospital and quickly spread to the army and civilians. The number of deaths soared so that disposal of the numerous corpses became a problem. The epidemic reached its peak at the end of January and only began to recede in March 1800.

== Commentary ==
Championnet saw that he needed to evacuate Genoa in order to shorten his long front, but the French Directory refused to consider it. Consequently, the French commander could not collect enough troops to defeat Melas near Cuneo. The French government thoroughly plundered Italy yet neglected to feed, clothe or pay its soldiers stationed there. Championnet should have advanced into Piedmont in one powerful force instead of moving in four widely separated columns. At Genola he spread his army across a broad front, while Melas had his army concentrated under his immediate control. Championnet unwisely chose to fight a pitched battle in the plains against an enemy that greatly outnumbered him in cavalry. Napoleon wrote of Championnet, "He distinguished himself in the Army of Sambre-et-Meuse, where his had been one of the principal divisions; there he had been imbued with the false principles of war with which Jourdan's plans were directed. He was brave, full of zeal, active, devoted to his country; he was a good general of division, an indifferent commander-in-chief."

== See also ==
- Rickard, J. (2010). "Battle of Genola, 4 November 1799". historyofwar.org.

Preceded by Battle of Castricum	French Revolution: Revolutionary campaigns Battle of Genola	Succeeded by Battles of Stockach and Engen
