= Drahomira =

Drahomira Temporal range: Silurian

Scientific classification
- Domain: Eukaryota
- Kingdom: Animalia
- Phylum: Mollusca
- Class: Monoplacophora
- Order: Tryblidiida
- Family: †Tryblidiidae
- Genus: †Drahomira; Perner, 1903

Genus of molluscs

Drahomira is an extinct genus of paleozoic monoplacophorans in the family Tryblidiidae.

== Distribution ==
Czech Republic.

== Genera ==
Species in the genus Drahomira include:

- Drahomira barrandei
- Drahomira glaseri
- Drahomira kriziana
- Drahomira rugata
