= Frodospira =

Frodospira Temporal range: Silurian

Scientific classification
- Domain: Eukaryota
- Kingdom: Animalia
- Phylum: Mollusca
- Class: Gastropoda
- Family: †Lophospiridae
- Genus: †Frodospira; Wagner, 1999

Type species
- Frodospira imbricata

Extinct genus of gastropods

Frodospira is an extinct genus of Lophospiridae, a family of extinct sea snails, fossil marine gastropod mollusks. The genus is found in deposits of the Silurian age in Sweden. It was named in honor of the fictional character Frodo Baggins from J. R. R. Tolkien's The Lord of the Rings.

== Species ==
The genus Frodospira contains the following four species:

- Frodospira cochleata (Lindström, 1884)
- Frodospira imbricata (Lindström, 1884)
- Frodospira munda (Lindström, 1884)
- Frodospira tortuosa (Lindström, 1884)
