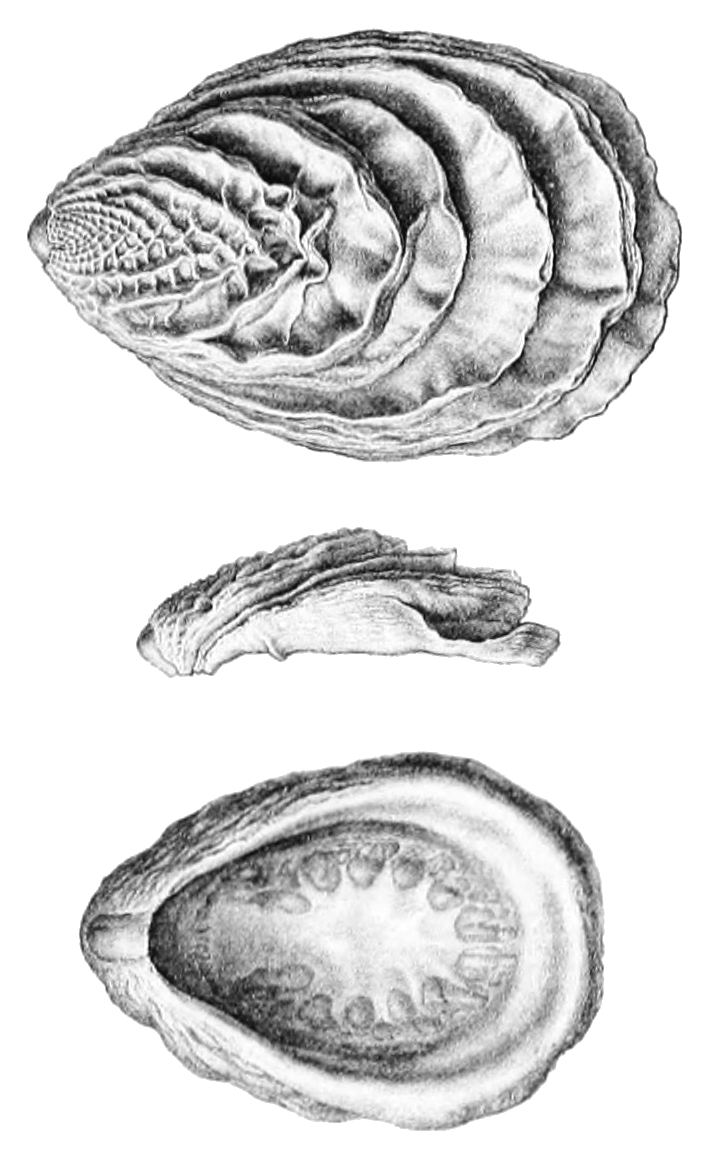
- Drawing of shells of Tryblidium reticulatum. Head region is on the left.

Scientific classification
- Domain: Eukaryota
- Kingdom: Animalia
- Phylum: Mollusca
- Class: Monoplacophora
- Order: Tryblidiida
- Family: †Tryblidiidae
- Genus: †Tryblidium
- Species: †T. reticulatum

Binomial name
- †Tryblidium reticulatum Lindström, 1880

= Tryblidium reticulatum =

Tryblidium reticulatum Temporal range: Silurian

Species of mollusc (fossil)

Tryblidium reticulatum is an extinct species of a paleozoic Silurian monoplacophoran.

This species have been discovered and originally described by Gustaf Lindström from Silurian of Gotland in Sweden in 1880. It lived in shallow water.

== Shell description ==
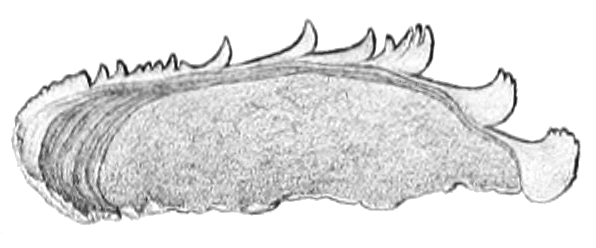
Drawing of cross section of lateral view of the shell of Tryblidium reticulatum. Head region is on the left.

The length of the shell is 43 mm, width 31 mm and the height of the shell is 10 mm.

There are visible muscular attachment scars on the ventral view.
