= Marcian of Tortona =

Saint Marcian of Tortona
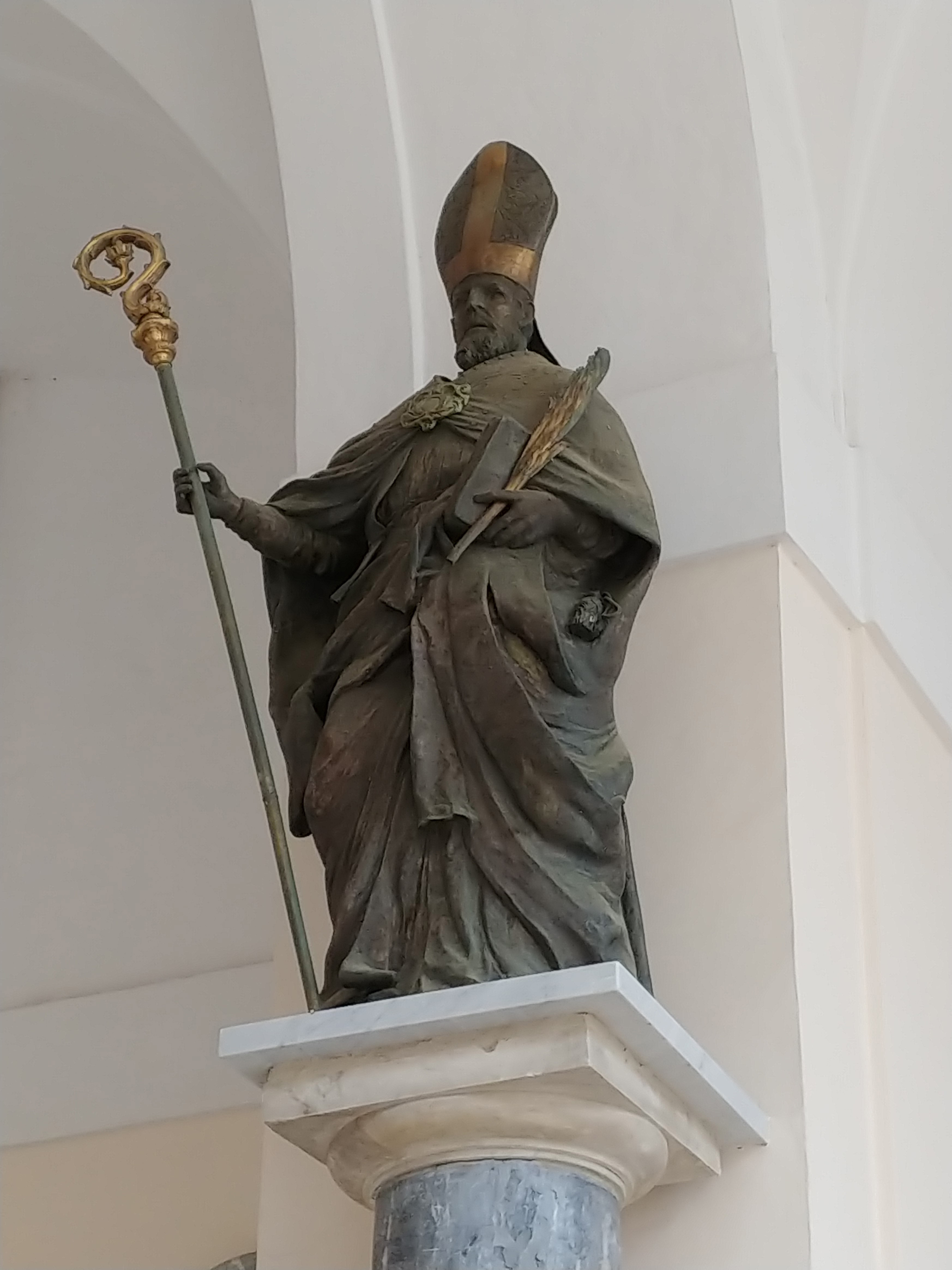
- Died: c. 120 AD
- Venerated in: Roman Catholic Church, Orthodox Church
- Feast: March 6
- Attributes: palm of martyrdom
- Patronage: Tortona; Genola

Marcian (Marciano, Marziano, Marcianus) of Tortona (died 117 or 120 AD) is a saint of Roman Catholic church. He is traditionally said to have been the first bishop of Tortona, in what is now north-western Italy, a post he held for forty-five years.

== Legend ==
Tradition states that he was born to a pagan family but was converted by Barnabas and then confirmed in the Christian faith by Sirus (Siro), bishop of Pavia. Secundus of Asti is said to have met Marcian at Tortona, when the former was still a pagan. Secundus' meeting with Marcian influenced his decision to become a Christian. He is said to have been crucified for his Christianity.

There is some disagreement about the year of his death. Some sources say it occurred in 117, under Trajan, while others say it was under Hadrian in 120.

== Historicity ==
Some people have argued that he is the same person as Marcian of Ravenna. Documents from the eighth century attest to his episcopate. Walafrid Strabo, in response to the construction of a church in honor of the saint, indicates that Marcian was the first bishop of the Tortonese community and a martyr. His relics, found on the left bank of the Scrivia in the fourth century by Innocent (Innocenzo), bishop of Brescia, can now be found in the cathedral of Tortona. A finger bone associated with the saint has been kept at Genola, of which he is also patron.

== Veneration ==
He is the patron saint of Tortona. His feast day is March 6.
