= The Bride of Messina (opera) =

The Bride of Messina (Czech: Nevěsta messinská) is a tragic opera in three acts, op. 18, by composer Zdeněk Fibich. The Czech language libretto by Otakar Hostinský is based on Friedrich Schiller's play Die Braut von Messina. Fibich's most Wagnerian opera, he composed the work between 1882 and 1883 for the purposes of submitting it in an opera competition sponsored by the National Theatre in Prague. The opera won first prize in the 1883 competition and it premiered at the National Theatre on 28 March 1884. At its first presentation music critics responded with high praise to the work and it is now considered to be Fibich's masterpiece. However, the opera's morose story, melancholy scoring and astringent style have hindered it from gaining wide popularity.

== Roles ==
Role	Voice type	Premiere Cast, 28 March 1884 (Conductor: Adolf Čech)
Donna Isabella	contralto	Betty Fibichová
Don Manuel	baritone	Leopold Stropnický
Don César	tenor	Antonín Vávra
Diego	bass	Vilém Heš
Béatrice	soprano	
Cayetan	bass	Karel Čech
Bohemund	tenor	

== Synopsis ==
Act 1

Don Manuel and Don Cesar, the sons of Donna Isabella (the ruling Princess of Messina), are feuding with one another. Overwraught with the situation, Isabella summons her sons to her and manages to help make peace between them.

Act 2

Manuel and Cesar discuss their plans to present their future wives to their mother for her approval. Isabella reveals to her sons that they have an unknown sister, Beatrice. She secured Beatrice away in a convent after her late husband had a dream which foretold that Beatrice would bring about the deaths of her sons. Diego, Isabella's servant, is sent to fetch Beatrice but returns with the disturbing news that she has been kidnapped.

Act 3

It is revealed that Manuel is in fact Beatrice's kidnapper. He comes to the horrible realization that the girl he loves must be his missing sister. Cesar stumbles upon Manuel and Beatrice and is surprised to find them together, as Beatrice is also the girl that he is in love with. In a jealous rage Cesar kills Manuel before he can explain the truth of the situation. When the full truth is revealed to him, Cesar commits suicide.

== Recordings ==
- Zdenek Fibich Nevěsta messinská - Libuše Márová (Donna Isabella) Václav Zítek (Don Manuel) Ivo Žídek (Don Cesar), Gabriela Beňačková (Beatrice) Karel Hanuš (Diego) Jaroslav Horáček (Cayetan) Miroslav Švejda (Bohemund) Naďa Šormová (Page des Cesars) Prager Rundfunkchor, Chor und Orchester Nationaltheater Prag, Milan Malý – Choreinstudierung František Jílek, 1975
- Zdenek Fibich Die Braut von Messina - Lucia Cervoni, Thomas Florio, Richard Samek, Johannes Stermann, Noa Danon, Magdeburgische Philharmonie, Kimbo Ishii 2 CDs CPO, DDD, 2015 from the German premiere sung in Czech.
