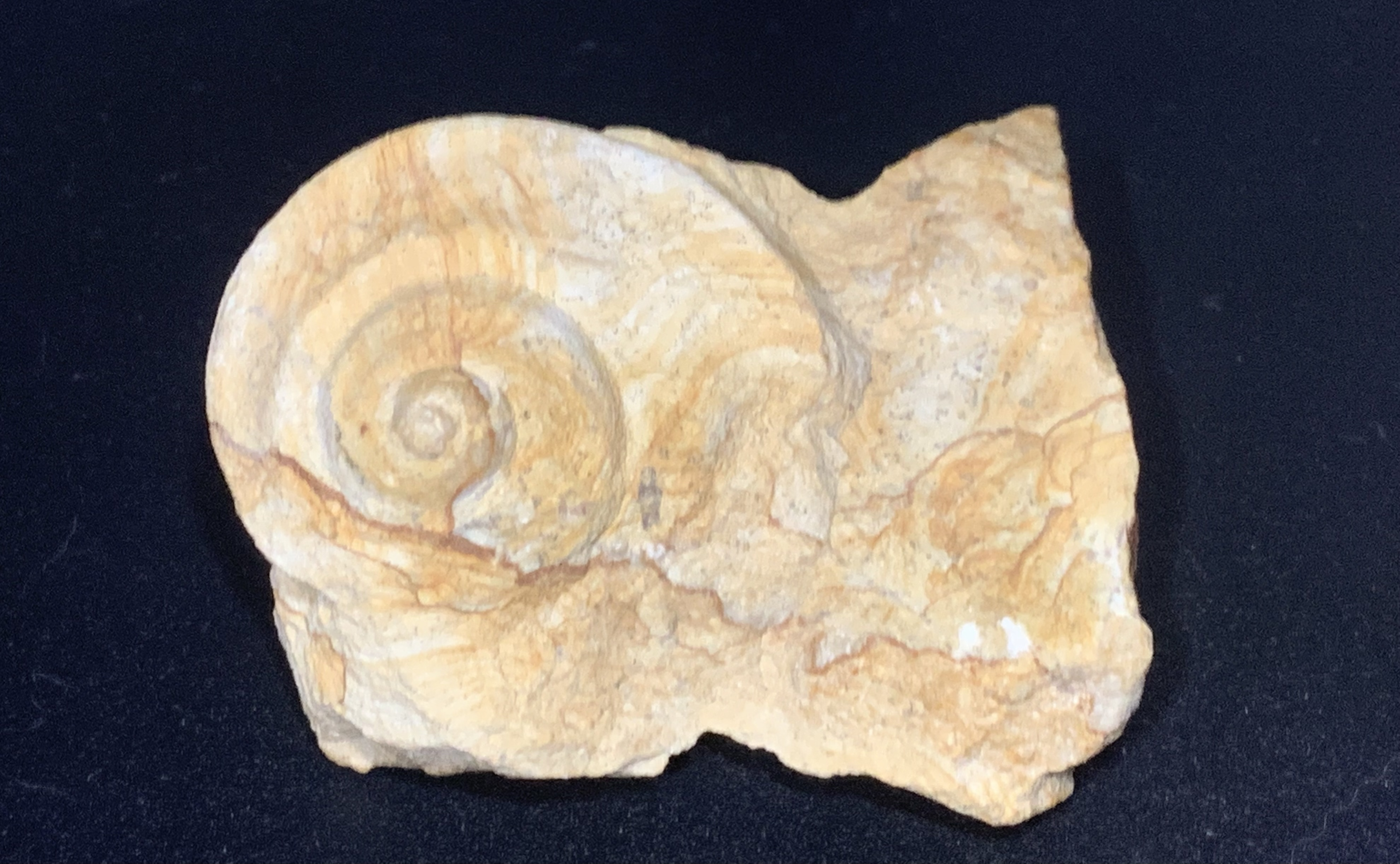
- Trochonema sp. from the middle Ordovician of the Galena formation of Minnesota

Scientific classification
- Kingdom: Animalia
- Phylum: Mollusca
- Class: Gastropoda
- Subclass: incertae sedis
- Superfamily: †Trochonematoidea; Zittel, 1895

= Trochonematoidea =

Extinct superfamily of gastropods

Trochonematoidea is an extinct taxonomic superfamily of fossil sea snails, marine gastropod molluscs.

== Families ==
Families with the superfamily Trochonematoidea include:

- † Trochonematidae
- † Lophospiridae
