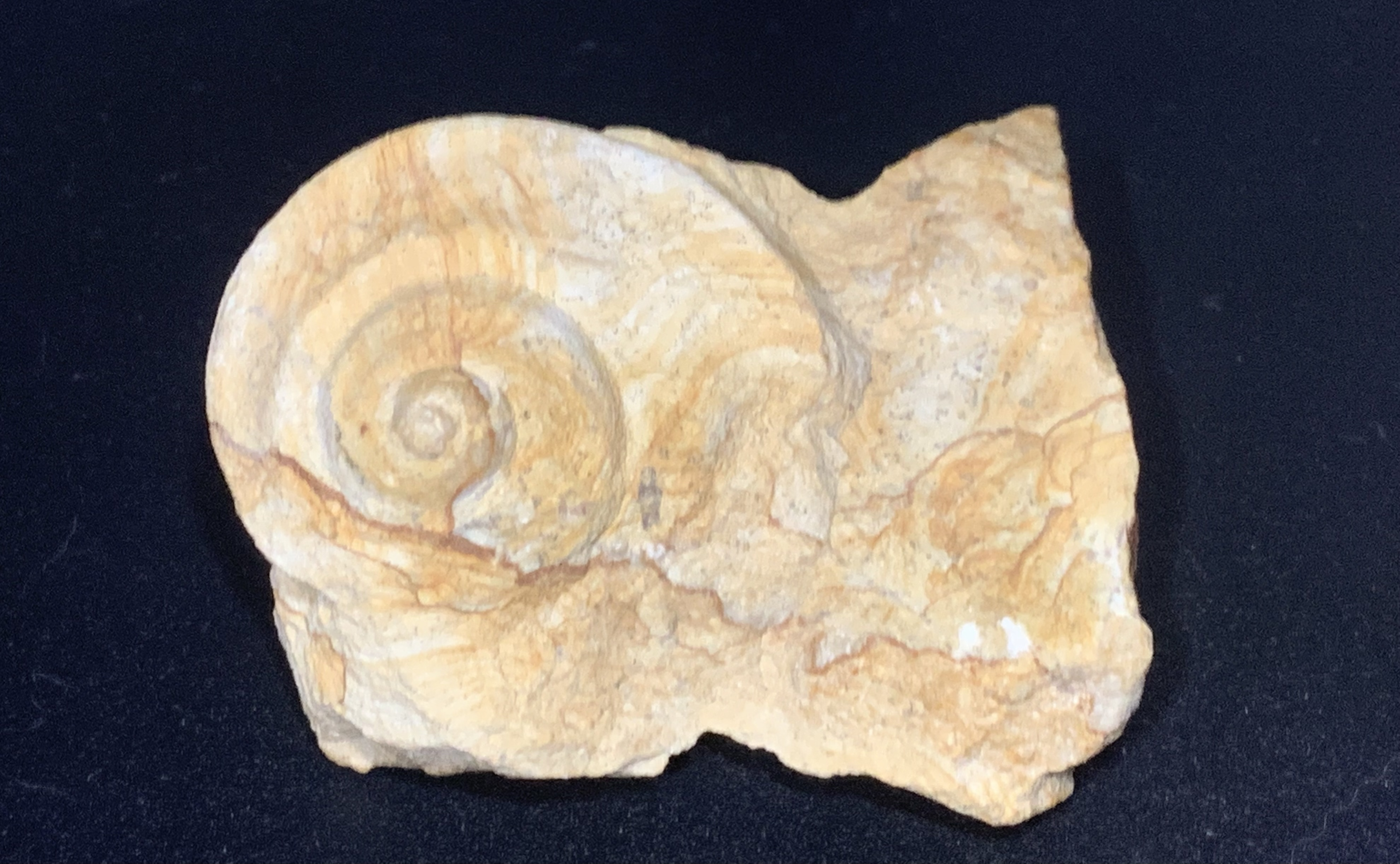
- Trochonema sp. from the middle Ordovician of the Galena formation of Minnesota

Scientific classification
- Kingdom: Animalia
- Phylum: Mollusca
- Class: Gastropoda
- Superfamily: †Trochonematoidea
- Family: †Trochonematidae; Zittel, 1895

= Trochonematidae =

Extinct family of gastropods

Trochonematidae is an extinct taxonomic family of fossil sea snails, marine gastropod molluscs in the superfamily Trochonematoidea.

This family has no subfamilies.

== Genera ==
- † Alanstukella Mazaev, 2020
- † Amaurotoma Knight, 1945
- † Knightinella Likharev, 1975
- † Trochonema Salter, 1859 - the type genus
- † Vicnigoria Mazaev, 2019
