= Vilém Heš =

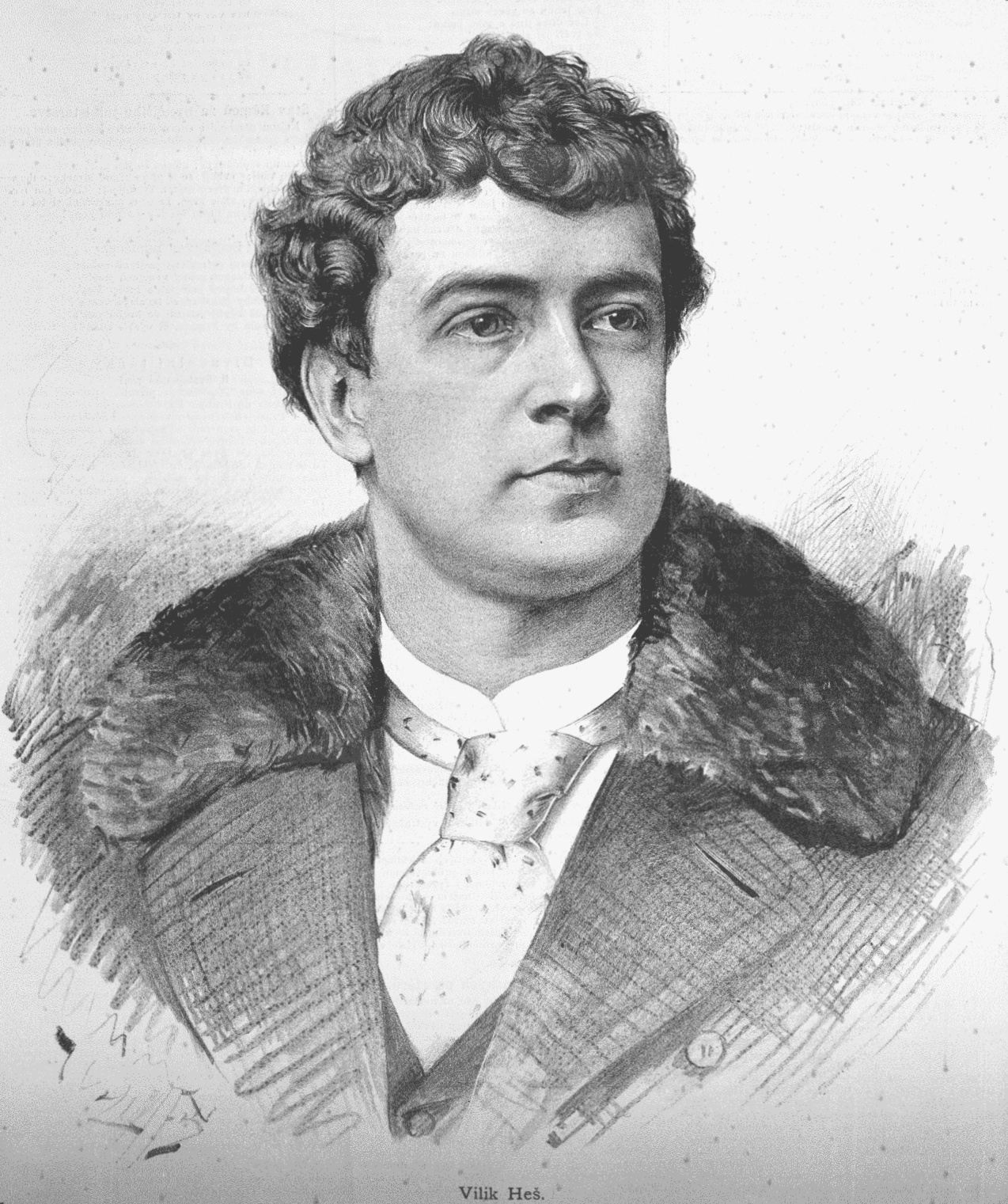
Vilém Heš (1889)

Vilém Heš, German Wilhelm (Willy) Hesch, (3 June 1860, in Týnec nad Labem – 4 January 1908, in Vienna) was a Czech operatic bass. He notably enjoyed a close artistic partnership with Gustav Mahler, singing in his opera companies in Hamburg and Vienna. He had a beautiful rich vocal tone, although at times his voice would take on a harsher quality in heavier repertoire.

Heš studied singing with bandleader J. Hartl. From 1880 to 1984 he was committed to the Provisional Theatre. He joined the National Theatre in Prague in 1884 where he remained for the next decade. While there he notably created roles in several world premieres, including Diego in Zdeněk Fibich's The Bride of Messina (28 March 1884) and Filip in Antonín Dvořák's The Jacobin (12 February 1889).

In 1894 Heš joined the roster of principal singers at the Hamburg State Opera where he stayed for two seasons. In 1896 he became a member of the Vienna State Opera, performing roles there until his death twelve years later. In 1901 he was a celebrated guest artist at the Salzburg Festival as Leporello in Don Giovanni. He was also often engaged at the Burgtheater in Vienna.

In the Czech repertoire, Heš was particularly admired for his portrayals of Mícha in The Bartered Bride, Mumlal in The Two Widows, and Rarach in The Devil's Wall. His other signature roles included Bartolo in Le nozze di Figaro, Mephistopheles in Faust, Papageno in The Magic Flute, and Rocco in Fidelio among others.

== Sources ==
- Biography of Vilém Heš at operasingers.sweb.cz (in Czech)
