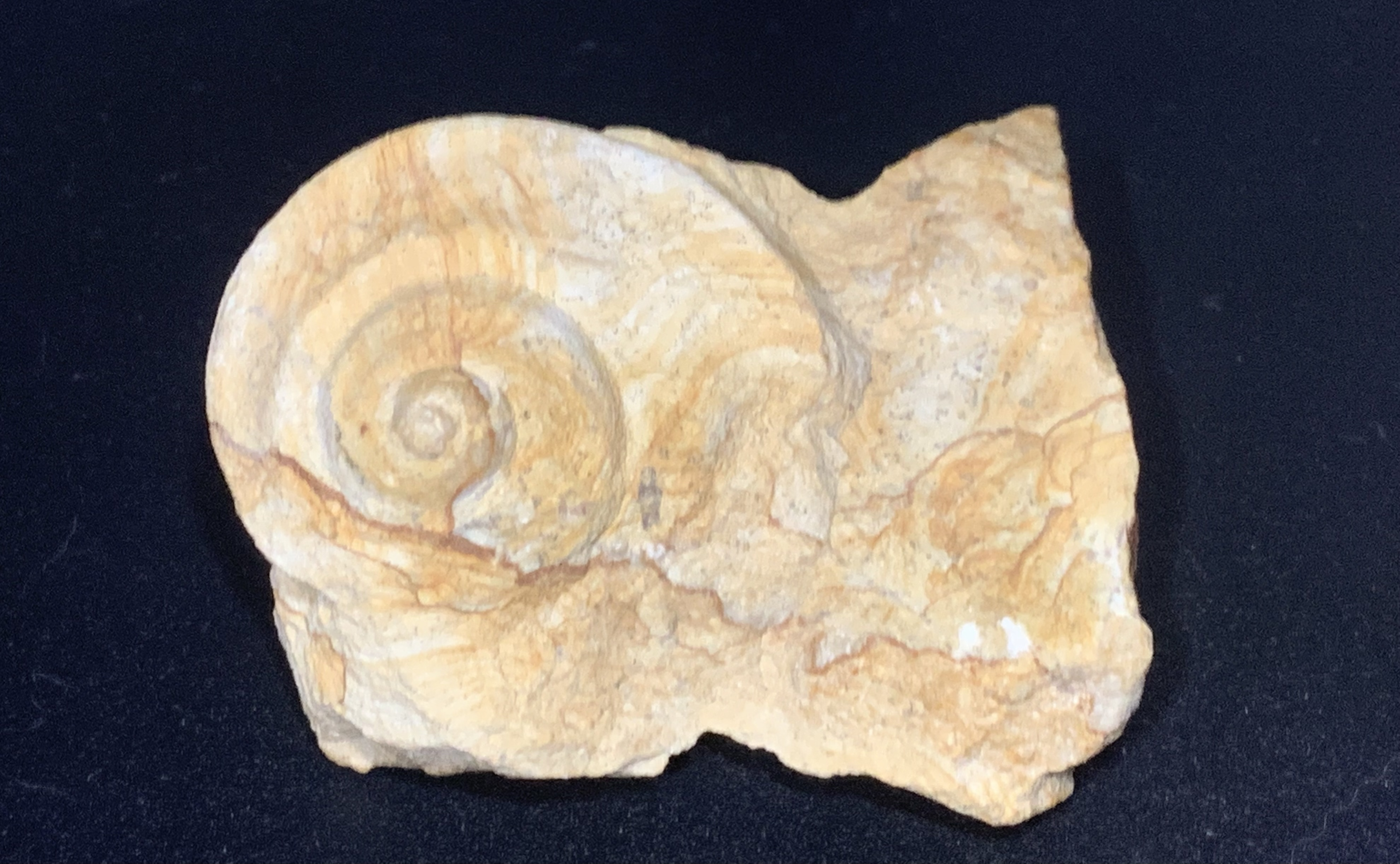
- Trochonema sp. from the middle Ordovician of the Galena Limestone of Minnesota

Scientific classification
- Kingdom: Animalia
- Phylum: Mollusca
- Class: Gastropoda
- Family: †Trochonematidae
- Genus: †Trochonema; Salter, 1859

= Trochonema =

Trochonema Temporal range: Darriwilian–Changhsingian

Extinct genus of marine snails

Trochonema is an extinct genus of early marine snail from the Paleozoic, which lasted almost 215 million years. It was first described by John William Salter in 1859. Like many genera in the order Murchisoniina, the relationship between it and other large gastropod clades is uncertain.
