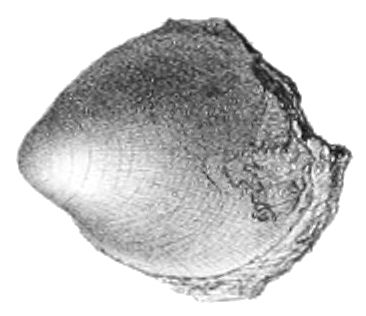
- Drawing of dorsal view of the shell of Helcionopsis radiatum. Head region is on the left.
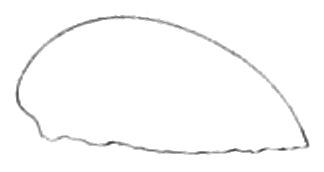
- Drawing of lateral view of the shell of Helcionopsis radiatum. Head region is on the left.

Scientific classification
- Domain: Eukaryota
- Kingdom: Animalia
- Phylum: Mollusca
- Class: Monoplacophora
- Order: Tryblidiida
- Family: †Tryblidiidae
- Genus: †Helcionopsis
- Species: †H. radiatum

Binomial name
- †Helcionopsis radiatum (Lindström, 1884)

Synonyms
- Tryblidium radiatum Lindström, 1884; Helcionopsis radiata (Lindström, 1884)

= Helcionopsis radiatum =

Helcionopsis radiatum Temporal range: Silurian

Species of mollusc (fossil)

Helcionopsis radiatum is an extinct species of paleozoic monoplacophoran in the family Tryblidiidae.

This species was first named as Tryblidium radiatum and described from Silurian in crystalline limestone of Wialmsudd near Fårösund in Sweden by Gustaf Lindström in 1884. Lindsröm found only one specimen.

== Shell description ==
The shell is oval and much elevatedly conical. The greatest height is lying near the middle of the longitudinal axis. The apex is in anterior end, truncated, curved as to lean forwards over the anterior margin of the aperture. The shell between the apex and the margin is consequently much concave. The apertural border is straight and horizontal. The surface is covered by fine, closely packed, radiating striae and a few concentric lines of growth. The shell has been thick, as may be seen by a few fragments which are left along the borders.

The length of the shell is 24 mm, width 20 mm and the height of the shell is 15 mm. Length of the aperture is 23 mm.
