= Louis Lemoine =

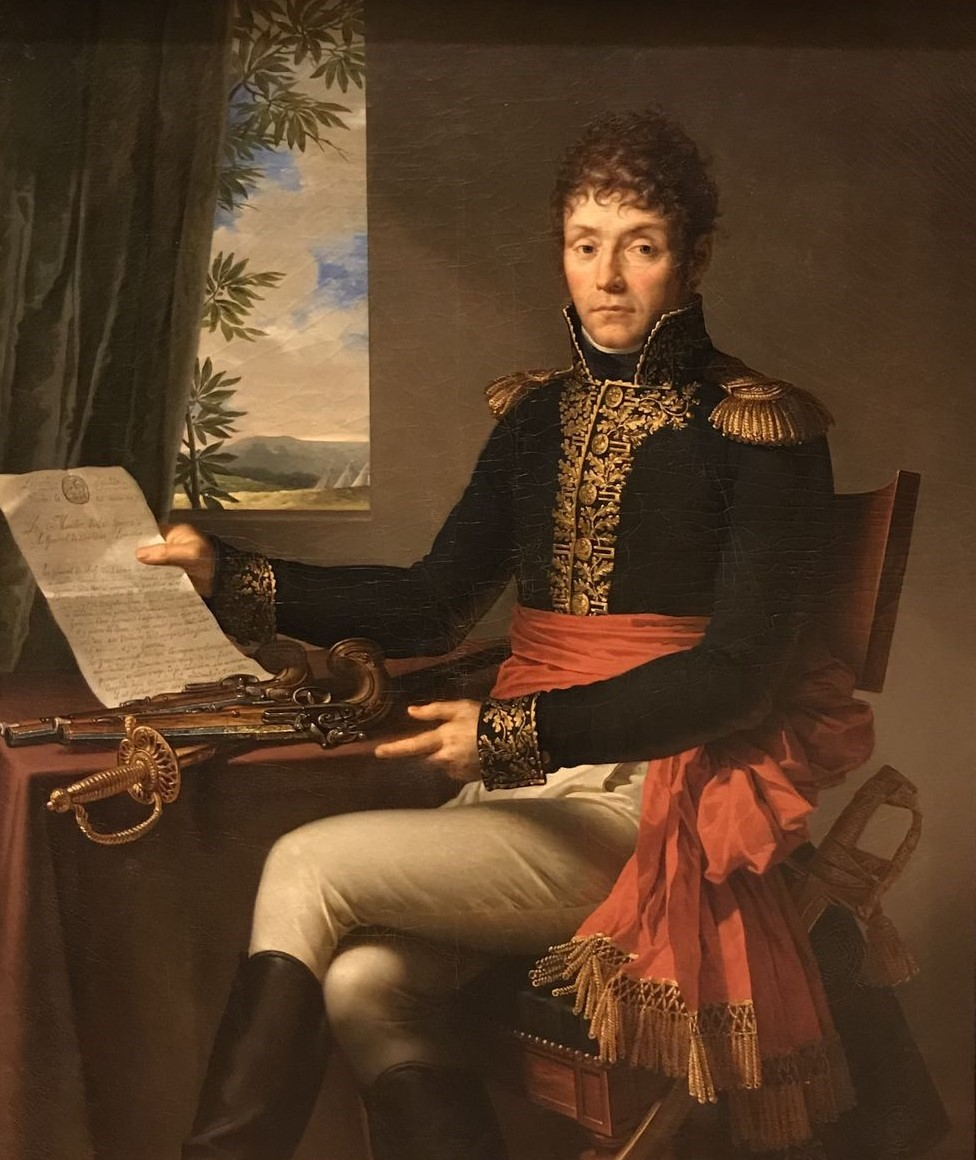
- Louis Lemoine
- Born: 23 November 1764; Saumur, France
- Died: 23 January 1842 (aged 77) Paris, France
- Allegiance: Kingdom of France; France
- Branch: Infantry
- Service years: 1783–1815
- Rank: General of Division
- Conflicts: War of the First Coalition; Battle of Jemappes; Battle of Neerwinden; Battle of Peyrestortes; Battle of Boulou; Battle of San Lorenzo; Battle of Quiberon; Battle of Neuwied; War of the Second Coalition; Battle of Novi; Battle of Genola
- Awards: Légion d'Honneur, 1814

Louis Lemoine (23 November 1764 – 23 January 1842) commanded a French infantry division during the French Revolutionary Wars. He enlisted in the French Royal Army in 1783 and rose to the rank of sous-officer. Elected lieutenant colonel of a volunteer battalion in 1791, he led his troops at Jemappes in 1792 and Neerwinden in 1793. Transferred to the Army of the Eastern Pyrenees and promoted to general of brigade, he fought at Peyrestortes, Boulou and San Lorenzo de la Muga where he was wounded. In 1795 he led his troops at Quiberon, was promoted to general of division the next year and fought at Neuwied in 1797. He commanded an infantry division at Novi and Genola in 1799. During the First French Empire he commanded posts in the interior. His surname is one of the names inscribed under the Arc de Triomphe, on Column 6.
