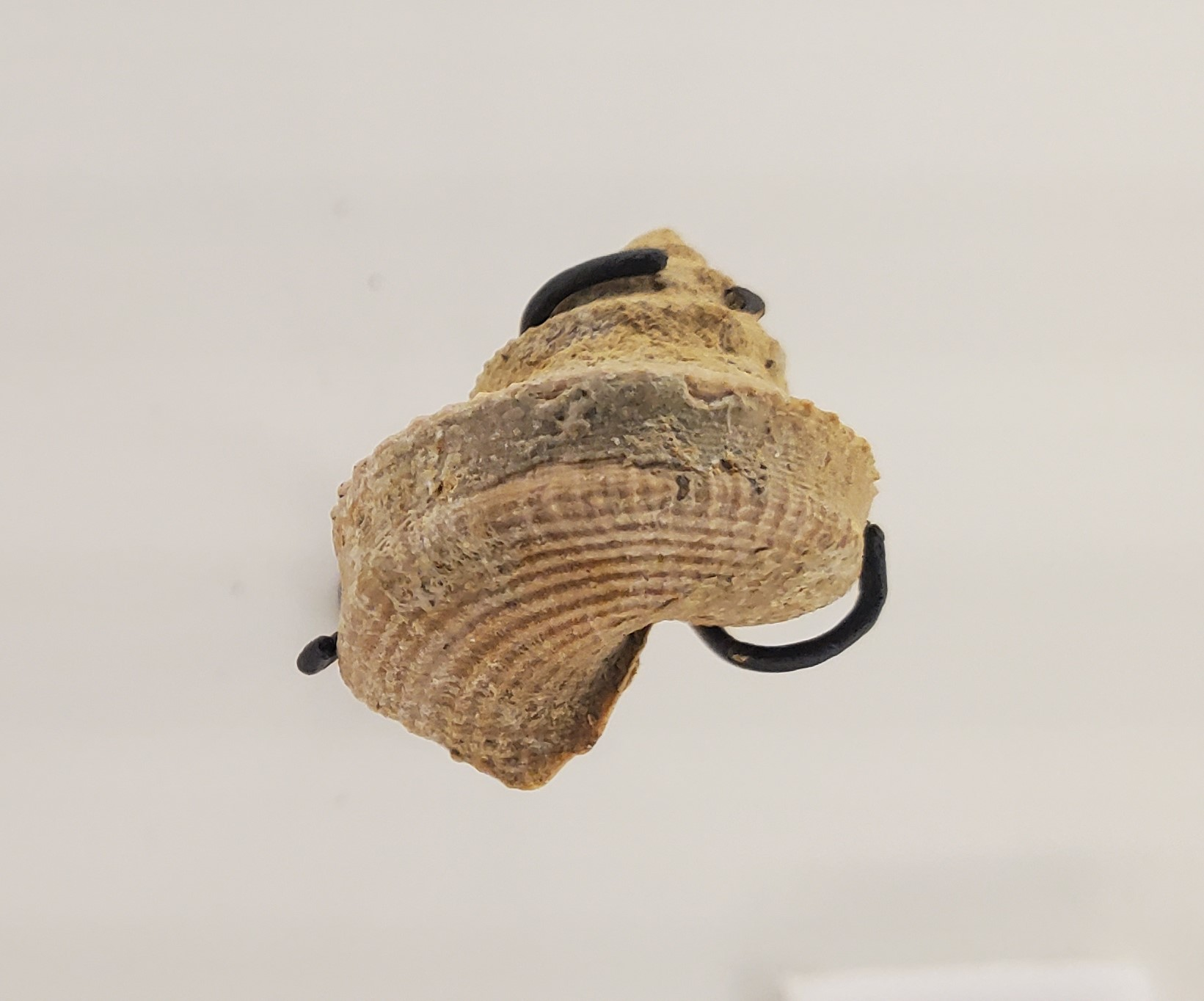
- Worthenia cf. tabulata

Scientific classification
- Kingdom: Animalia
- Phylum: Mollusca
- Class: Gastropoda
- Family: †Lophospiridae
- Genus: †Worthenia de Koninck, 1883

= Worthenia =

Worthenia Temporal range: Devonian - Triassic

Extinct genus of gastropods

Worthenia is an extinct genus of sea snail found in the fossil record. This genus is primarily found in rocks formed during the Devonian to Triassic periods (416-200 Ma) from the central areas of North America. Worthenia was named for the paleontologist Amos Henry Worthen, who lived from 1813 to 1888.

Worthenia species have a "turban-shaped shell in which a raised ridge follows the margin of the whorls. Small nodes occur along the ridge, and the opening of the shell is oval and large."
