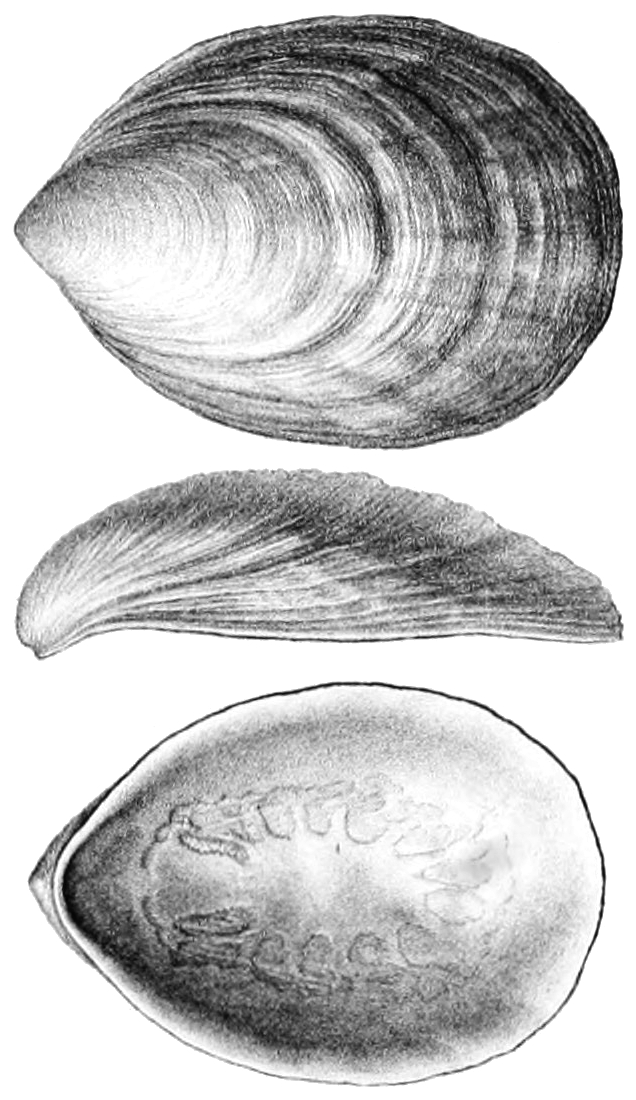
- Drawing of the shell of Pilina unguis. Head region is on the left.

Scientific classification
- Domain: Eukaryota
- Kingdom: Animalia
- Phylum: Mollusca
- Class: Monoplacophora
- Order: Tryblidiida
- Family: †Tryblidiidae
- Genus: †Pilina; Koken & Perner, 1925

= Pilina =

Pilina Temporal range: Ordovician–Silurian

Pilina is an extinct genus of paleozoic monoplacophorans in the family Tryblidiidae.

== Species ==
Species in the genus Pilina include:

- Pilina acuminatum Perner (in Koken & Perner), 1925
- Pilina cheyennica Peel, 1977 - from Ordovician in the Keel Member in Oklahoma
- Pilina esthonum (Koken, 1897) - synonym: Triblidium esthonum
- Pilina ovoideum Perner (in Koken & Perner), 1925
- Pilina solarium (Lindström, 1884) - synonym: Palaeacmaea solarium
- Pilina unguis (Lindström, 1880) - synonym: Tryblidium unguis
