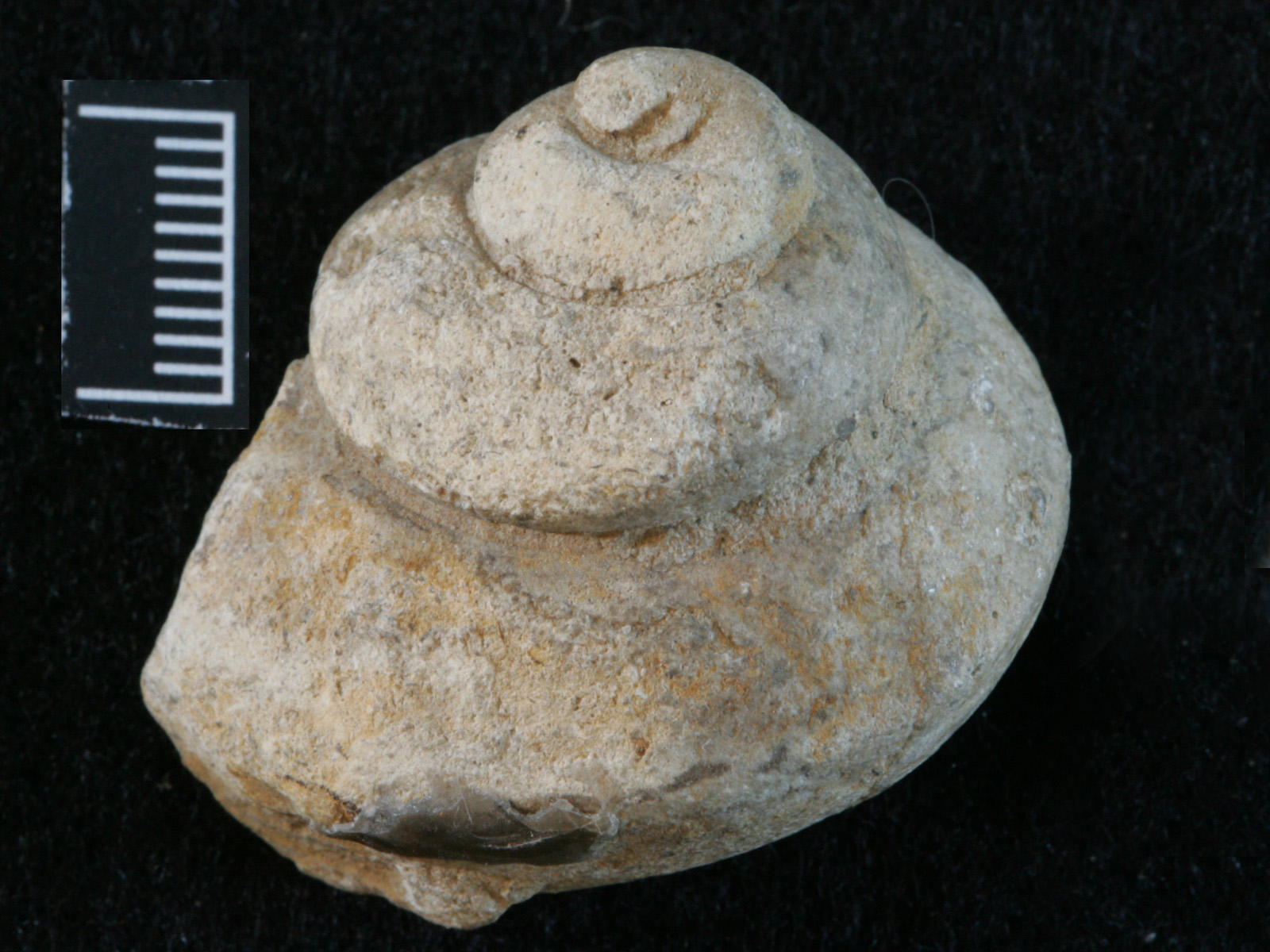
- Lophospira sp.

Scientific classification
- Kingdom: Animalia
- Phylum: Mollusca
- Class: Gastropoda
- Superfamily: †Trochonematoidea
- Family: †Lophospiridae; Wenz, 1938

Synonyms
- Gyronematinae Knight, 1956; Ruedemanniinae Knight, 1956

= Lophospiridae =

Extinct family of gastropods

Lophospiridae is an extinct taxonomic family of sea snails, marine gastropod molluscs.

This family has no subfamilies.

== Genera ==
Lophospiridae contains the following genera:

- Arjamannia (Peel, 1975)
- Biarmeaspira
- Chlupacispira
- Donaldiella (Cossmann, 1903)
- Ectomaria (Koken, 1896)
- Eunema (Salter, 1859)
- Frodospira (Wagner, 1999)
- Hanusispira (Horny, 1992)
- Kawanamia (Kase, 1988)
- Longstaffia (Cossmann, 1908)
- Lophospira (Whitfield, 1886)
- Loxoplocus (Fischer, 1885)
- Manzanospira (Batten, 1989)
- Paupospira (Wagner, 1999)
- Platyworthenia (Chronic, 1951)
- Proturritella (Koken, 1889)
- Ptychozone (Perner in Barrande, 1907)
- Ruedemannia (Foerste, 1911)
- Schizolopha
- Spinulrichospira
- Solenospira (Ulrich & Scofield, 1897)
- Tunstallia (Hollingworth & Barker, 1991)
- Worthenia (de Koninck, 1883)
