= Michael von Melas =

Austrian General of the cavalry (1729–1806)

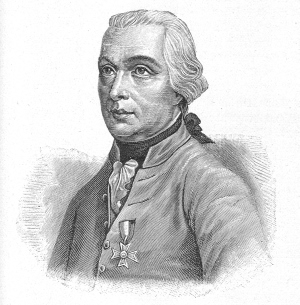
- Born: 12 May 1729; Radeln, Transylvania, Ottoman Empire
- Died: 31 May 1806 (aged 77); Týnec nad Labem, Bohemia, Austrian Empire

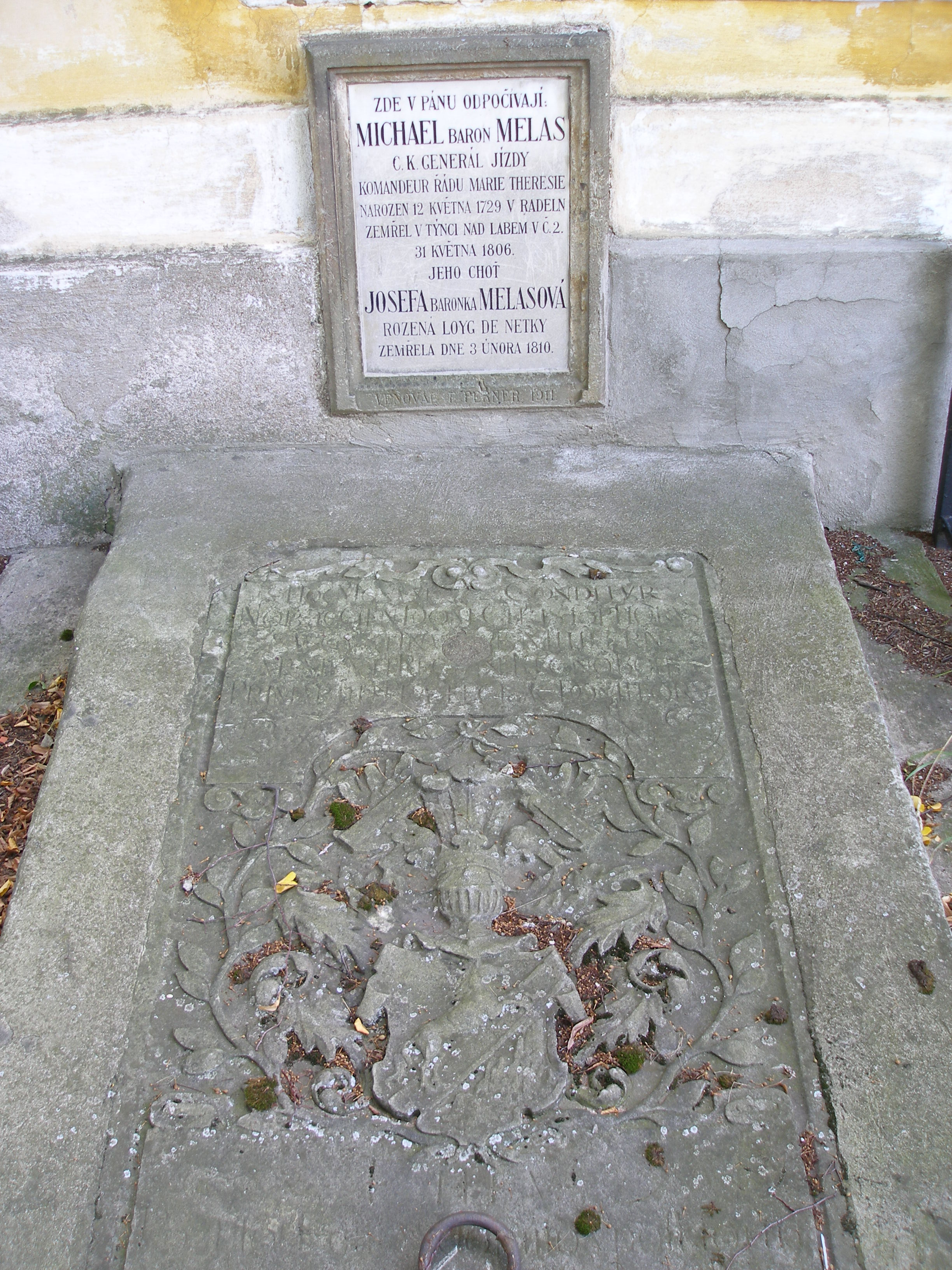
His grave in Bohemia

Michael Friedrich Benedikt Baron von Melas (12 May 1729 – 31 May 1806) was a Transylvanian-born general of the cavalry for the Austrian Empire during the French Revolutionary Wars.

== Life ==
He was born in Radeln, Transylvania, (nowadays Roadeș, part of Bunești commune, Brașov County, Romania) in 1729 and joined the Austrian Army at age 17. He served in the Seven Years' War as aide de camp for Leopold Josef Graf Daun. He was promoted to colonel in 1781. He fought on the lower Rhine in 1794 and the middle Rhine in 1795.

Melas later led, as a general of the cavalry, the Austrian Army in Italy during Napoleon Bonaparte's campaigns in Italy, part of the War of the Second Coalition. Serving under Russian field marshal Alexander Suvorov, who commanded Second Coalition forces, he commanded Austrian forces in victories at the battles of Cassano, Trebbia, Novi, Genola, and the Siege of Genoa, and came near to another victory over Napoleon at the Battle of Marengo before making the mistake of handing over command to a subordinate for what he thought was the pursuit from the field of a beaten foe. A stand made by the French forces further down the road, and a subsequent counter-attack by the French General Louis Desaix led to a defeat for Melas' forces. The day after the battle he was compelled to sign the Convention of Alessandria, which gave the rule of Italy up to the Mincio River to Napoleon, the Habsburg Crown's authority being in consequence forced out of Italy.

Melas was later a Habsburg commander in Bohemia. He retired in 1803. He died in 1806 at Týnec nad Labem, in Bohemia.

== Bibliography ==
- Clausewitz, Carl von (2018). Napoleon's 1796 Italian Campaign. Trans and ed. Nicholas Murray and Christopher Pringle. Lawrence, Kansas: University Press of Kansas. ISBN 978-0-7006-2676-2
- Clausewitz, Carl von (2020). Napoleon Absent, Coalition Ascendant: The 1799 Campaign in Italy and Switzerland, Volume 1. Trans and ed. Nicholas Murray and Christopher Pringle. Lawrence, Kansas: University Press of Kansas. ISBN 978-0-7006-3025-7
- Clausewitz, Carl von (2021). The Coalition Crumbles, Napoleon Returns: The 1799 Campaign in Italy and Switzerland, Volume 2. Trans and ed. Nicholas Murray and Christopher Pringle. Lawrence, Kansas: University Press of Kansas. ISBN 978-0-7006-3034-9
