= Jaroslav Perner =

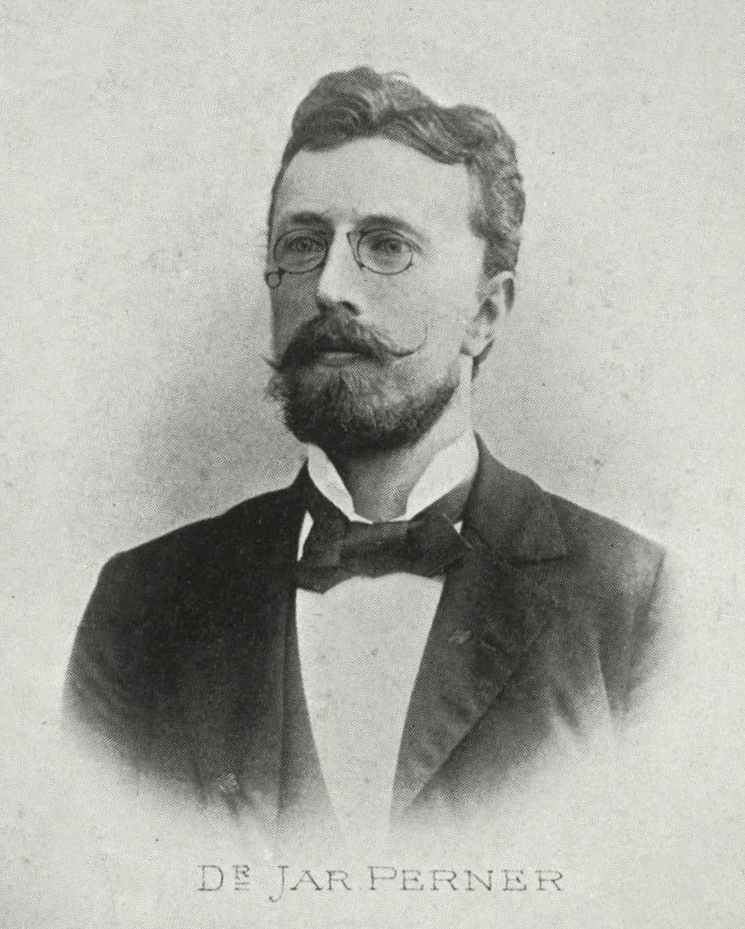
Jaroslav Perner in 1899

Jaroslav Perner (March 28, 1869 in Týnec nad Labem – June 9, 1947 in Prague) was a Czech paleontologist.

In 1927 Perner became professor of paleontology at the Charles University in Prague. He continued the work started by Joachim Barrande (the Système silurien du centre de la Bohême). He was also custodian of the Czech National Museum in Prague.

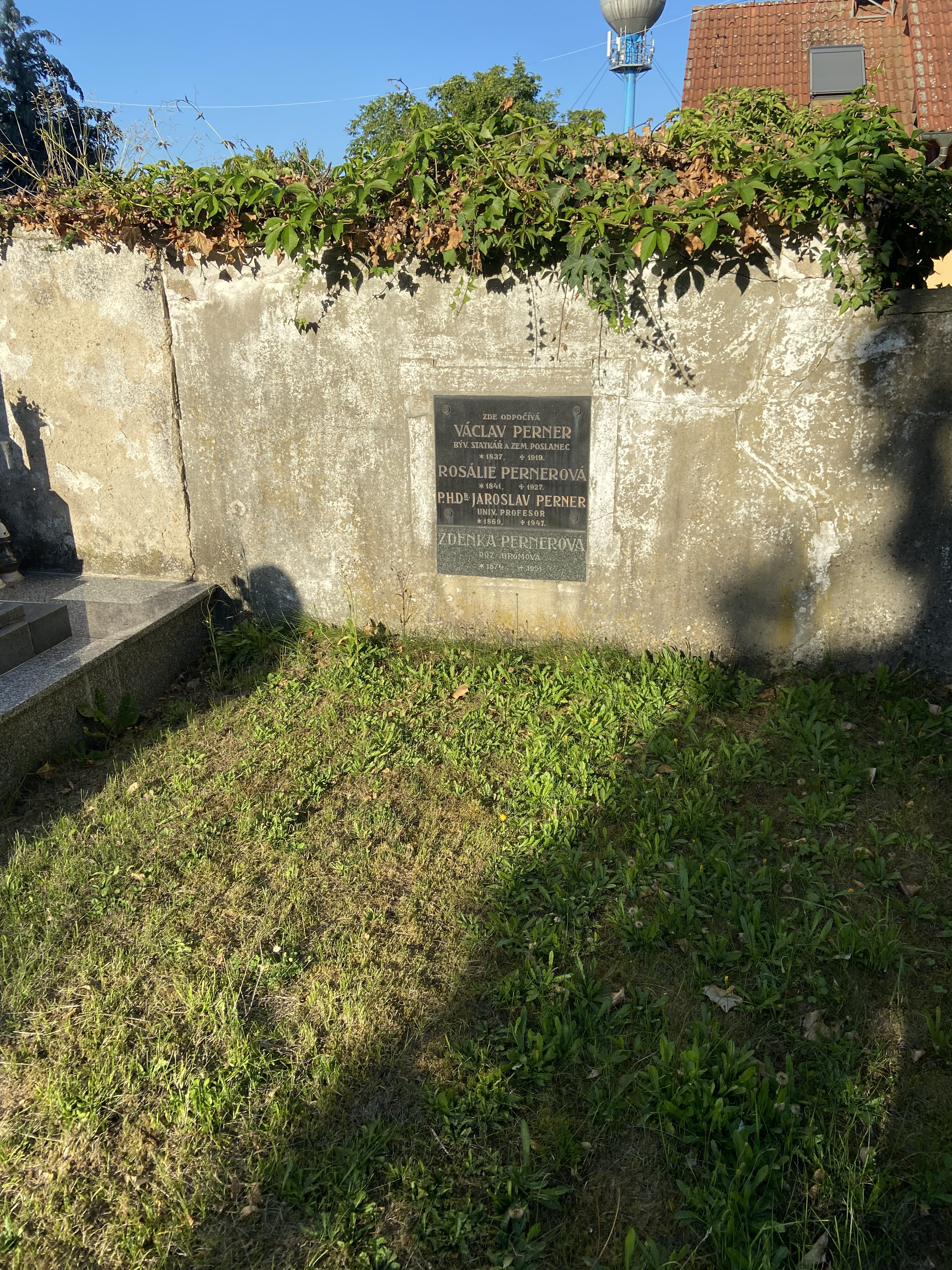
Jaroslav Perner gravestone in Tynec nad Labem hřbitov
