= Týnec nad Labem =

- Town
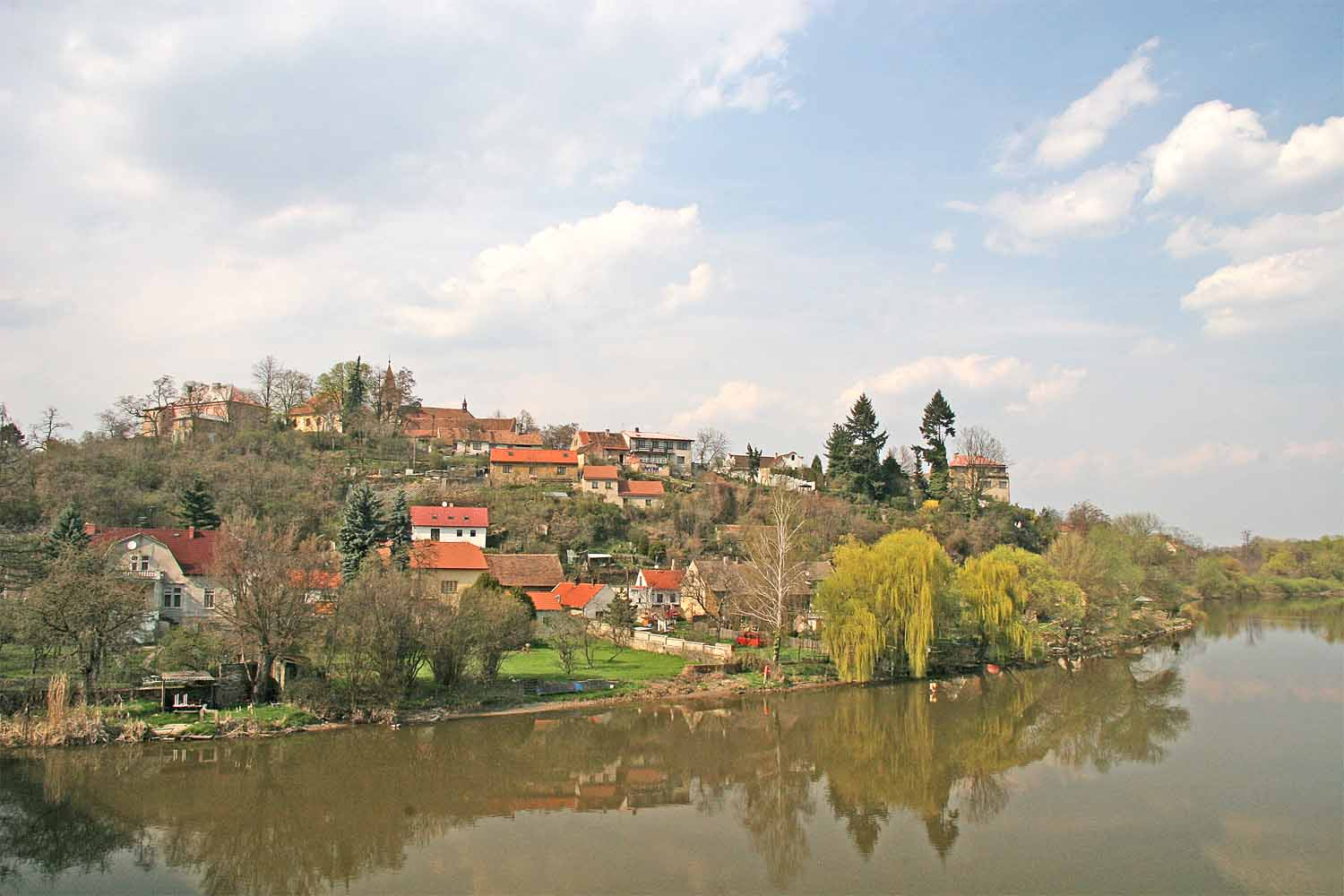
- Town centre as seen over the Elbe

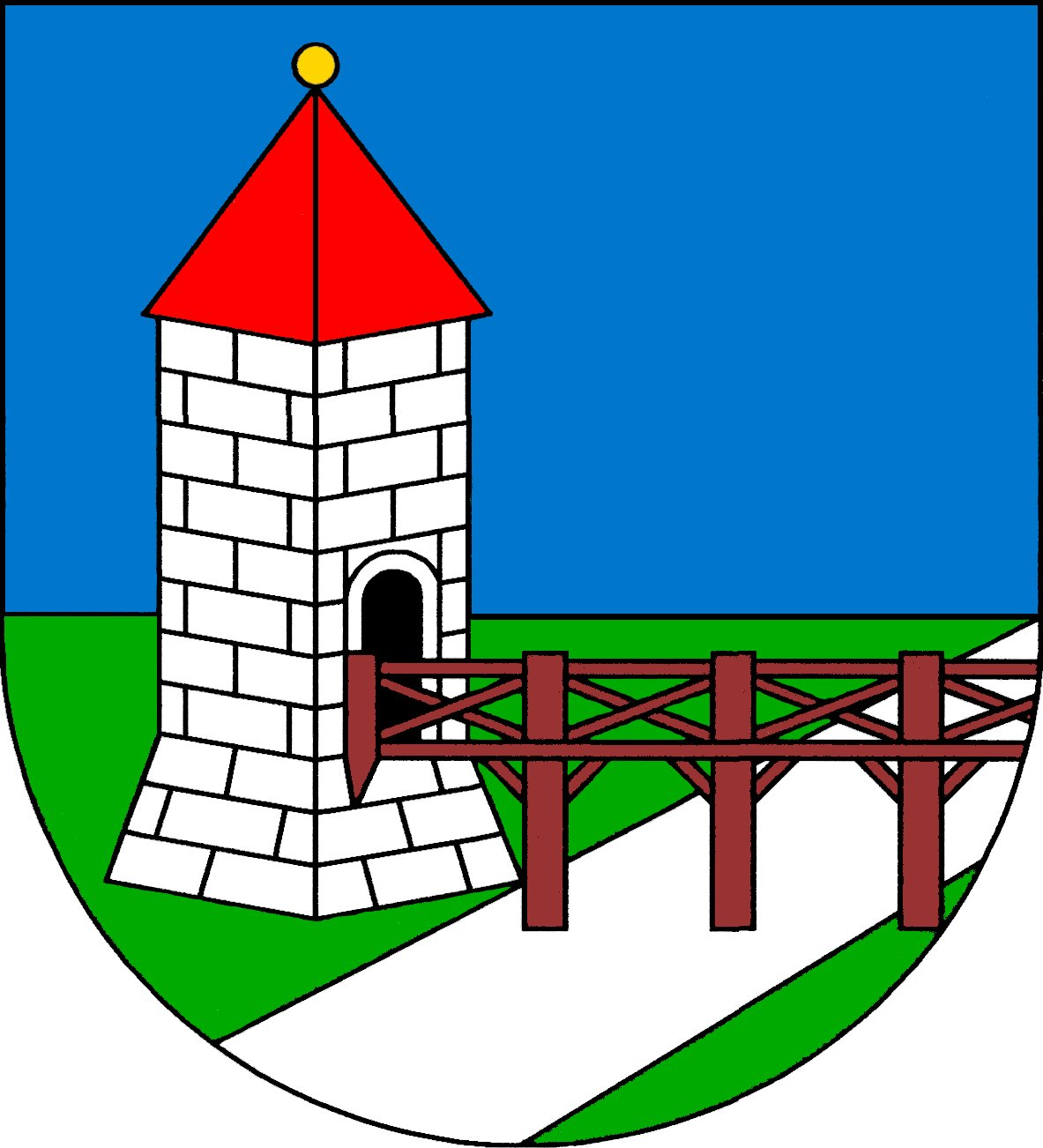
- Flag Coat of arms

- Location in the Czech Republic
- Coordinates: 50°2′31″N 15°21′30″E
- Country: Czech Republic
- Region: Central Bohemian
- District: Kolín
- First mentioned: 1110

Government
  - Mayor: Dušan Žmolil

Area
  - Total: 15.69 km^{2} (6.06 sq mi)
- Elevation: 238 m (781 ft)

Population (2026-01-01)
  - Total: 2,173
  - Density: 138.5/km^{2} (358.7/sq mi)
- Time zone: UTC+1 (CET)
  - Summer (DST): UTC+2 (CEST)
- Postal code: 281 26
- Website: www.tynecnadlabem.cz

Týnec nad Labem (Czech pronunciation: [ˈtiːnɛts ˈnad labɛm]; German: Elbeteinitz) is a town in Kolín District in the Central Bohemian Region of the Czech Republic. It has about 2,200 inhabitants. The town is located on the Elbe River, on the border between the Iron Mountains, Central Elbe Table and East Elbe Table.

Týnec nad Labem was founded in the first half of the 12th century at the latest and became a town in 1600. The historic town centre is well preserved and is protected as an urban monument zone.

== Administrative division ==
Týnec nad Labem consists of three municipal parts (in brackets population according to the 2021 census):

- Týnec nad Labem (1,680)
- Lžovice (185)
- Vinařice (225)

== Etymology ==
The name Týnec is a diminutive of the Old Czech word týn (related to English 'town'), meaning 'fortified settlement'.

== Geography ==
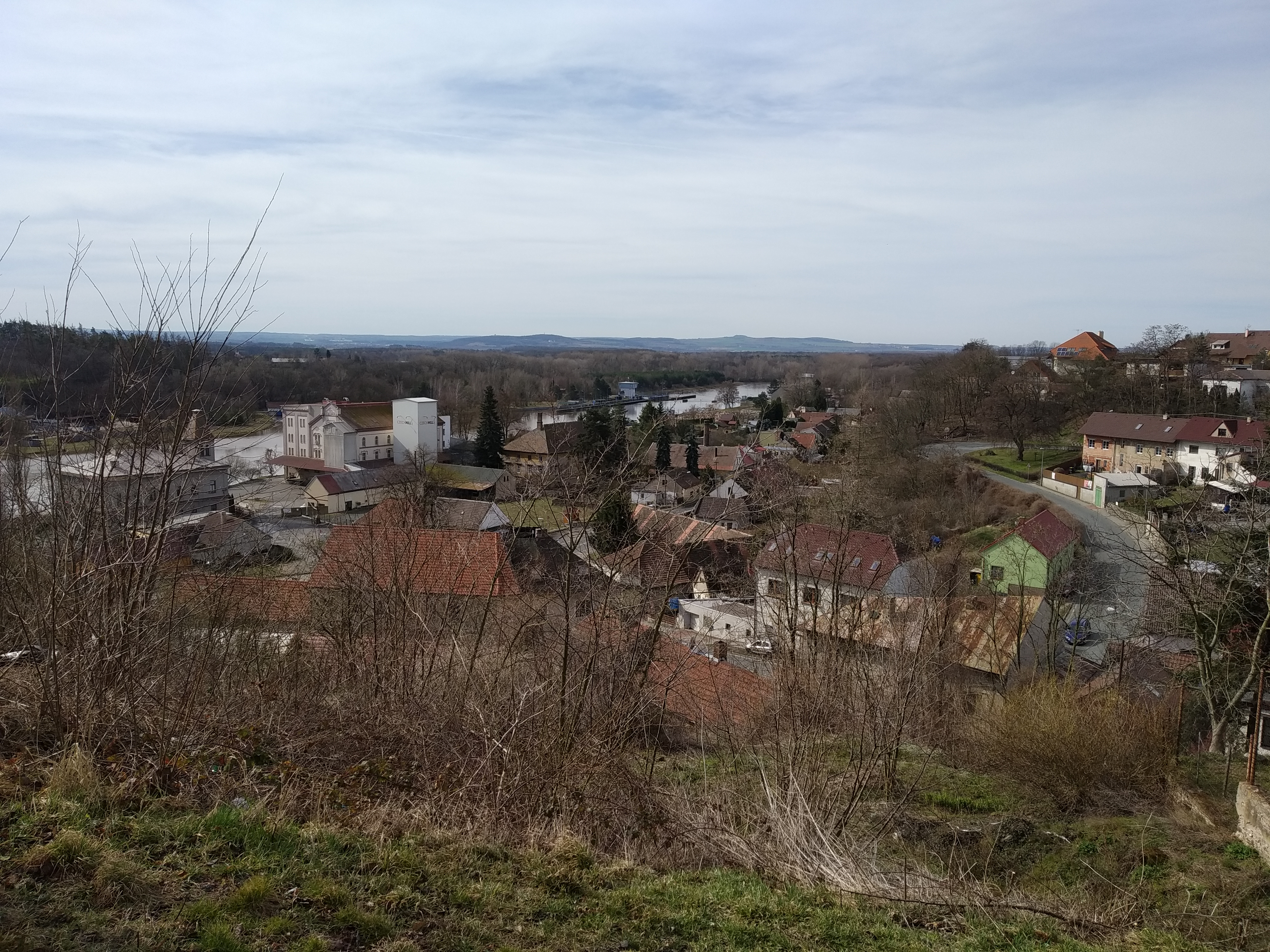
General view

Týnec nad Labem is located about 11 kilometres (7 mi) east of Kolín and 58 km (36 mi) east of Prague. It lies in the northwestern tip of the Iron Mountains, which passes into the lowlands of the Central Elbe Table and East Elbe Table. The Elbe River flows through the town.

== History ==
The first written mention of Týnec nad Labem is from 1110, when there was a meeting of dukes of the Přemyslid dynasty, described in the Chronica Boemorum. After it changed owners several times, it was acquired by the Cistercian Sedlec Abbey. The monks founded here a monastery, inn and mill. After the Hussite Wars in 1463, Týnec was acquired by Vaněk of Miletínek, who had a fortress built here.

The next significant owner was Vilém II of Pernštejn. During his rule, Týnec was first referred to as a market town. In 1560, it was bought by Maximilian II. In 1600, Týnec was promoted to a town by Emperor Rudolf II. The town was valued as an important crossing point across the Elbe.

At the end of the 18th century and in the 19th century, the town became an economic and cultural centre. There were mills, a wool spinning factory, and the only patent leather factory in Austria-Hungary. In 1864, an engineering factory was established. Týnec nad Labem was also the centre of the pearl industry.

== Demographics ==
Historical population

| Year | Pop. | ±% |
|---|---|---|
| 1869 | 2,992 | — |
| 1880 | 2,813 | −6.0% |
| 1890 | 2,739 | −2.6% |
| 1900 | 2,668 | −2.6% |
| 1910 | 2,558 | −4.1% |

| Year | Pop. | ±% |
|---|---|---|
| 1921 | 2,403 | −6.1% |
| 1930 | 2,320 | −3.5% |
| 1950 | 2,226 | −4.1% |
| 1961 | 2,154 | −3.2% |
| 1970 | 2,068 | −4.0% |

| Year | Pop. | ±% |
|---|---|---|
| 1980 | 1,941 | −6.1% |
| 1991 | 1,912 | −1.5% |
| 2001 | 1,860 | −2.7% |
| 2011 | 1,968 | +5.8% |
| 2021 | 2,090 | +6.2% |

Source: Censuses

== Transport ==
Týnec nad Labem is located on the railway line Kolín–Česká Třebová.

== Sights ==
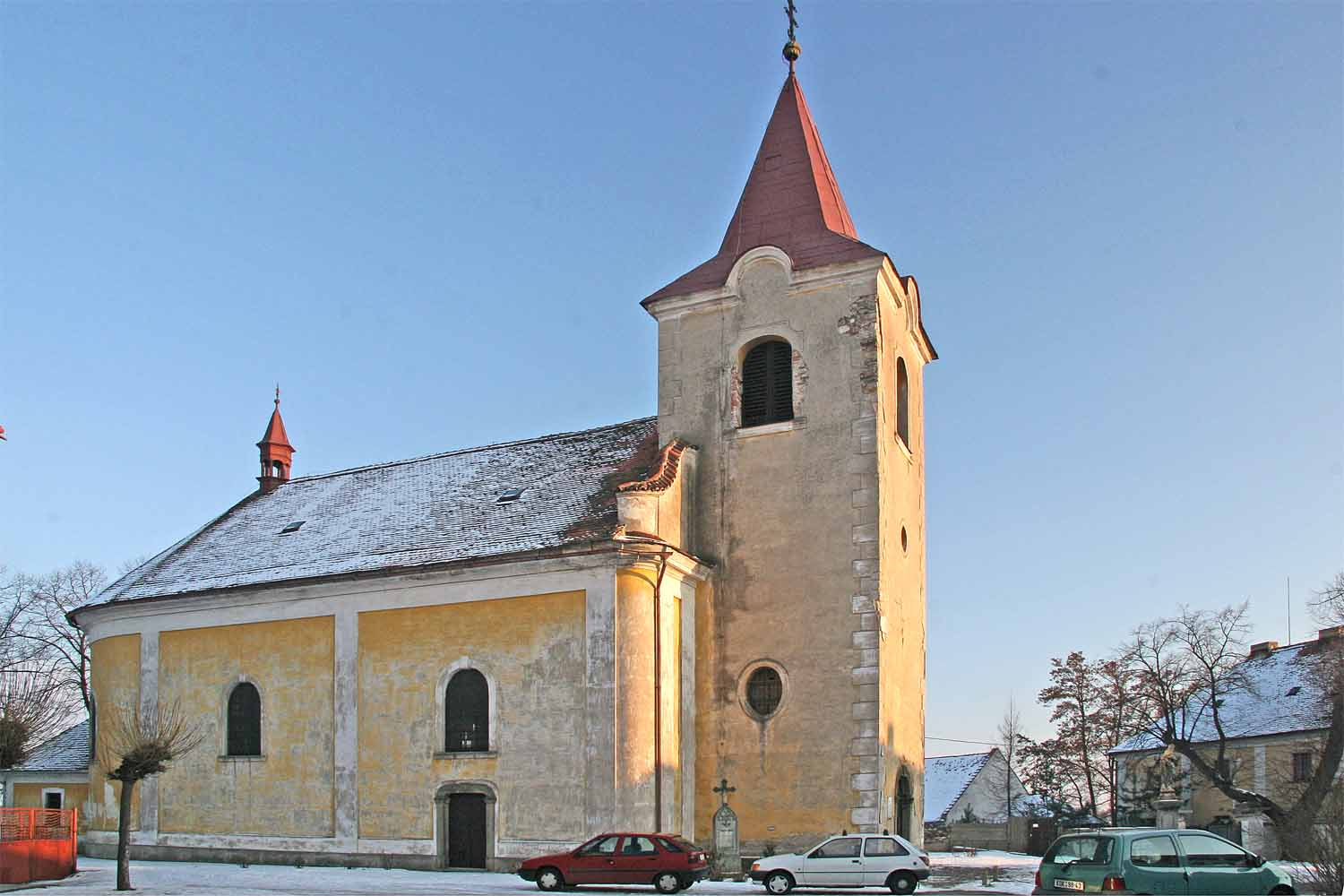
Church of the Beheading of Saint John the Baptist

The main landmark of the town is the Church of the Beheading of Saint John the Baptist. It was founded around 1306. It was damaged by several fires and then was rebuilt in the Baroque style. The second church in the town is the Church of the Blessed Virgin Mary of the Seven Sorrows. It is a cemetery church dating from 1786.

Other sights include a fortress from the 15th century and Marian column on the town square with a statue of the Virgin Mary from 1786.

== Notable people ==
- Michael von Melas (1729–1806), field marshal
- Vilém Heš (1860–1908), operatic bass
