= Genola, Piedmont =

Genola
- Comune
- Comune di Genola
- Location within Italy Location within Piedmont
- Coordinates: 44°35′N 7°40′E
- Country: Italy
- Region: Piedmont
- Province: Province of Cuneo (CN)

Government
  - Mayor: Piermarco Aimetta; Elected 2004-06-13

Area
  - Total: 13.74 km^{2} (5.31 sq mi)
- Elevation: 345 m (1,132 ft)

Population (Dec. 2004)
  - Total: 2,380
  - Density: 173/km^{2} (449/sq mi)
- Demonym: Genolesi
- Time zone: UTC+1 (CET)
  - Summer (DST): UTC+2 (CEST)
- Postal code: 12040
- Dialing code: 0172
- Patron saint: Saint Marcian of Tortona
- Saint day: third Sunday of May

Genola is a comune (municipality) in the Province of Cuneo in the Italian region Piedmont, located about 50 km (31 mi) south of Turin and about 25 km (16 mi) northeast of Cuneo. As of 31 December 2004, it had a population of 2,380 and an area of 13.7 km^{2} (5.3 sq mi).

Genola borders the following municipalities: Fossano and Savigliano.

== Demographic evolution ==
Historical population

Year	Pop.	±%
1861	2,046	—
1871	2,016	−1.5%
1881	2,039	+1.1%
1901	1,686	−17.3%
1911	1,777	+5.4%

Year	Pop.	±%
1921	1,809	+1.8%
1931	1,736	−4.0%
1936	1,759	+1.3%
1951	1,681	−4.4%
1961	1,442	−14.2%

Year	Pop.	±%
1971	1,407	−2.4%
1981	1,986	+41.2%
1991	2,110	+6.2%
2001	2,323	+10.1%

Source: Data from ISTAT

== Twin towns ==
Genola is twinned with:

- Marcos Juárez, Argentina
