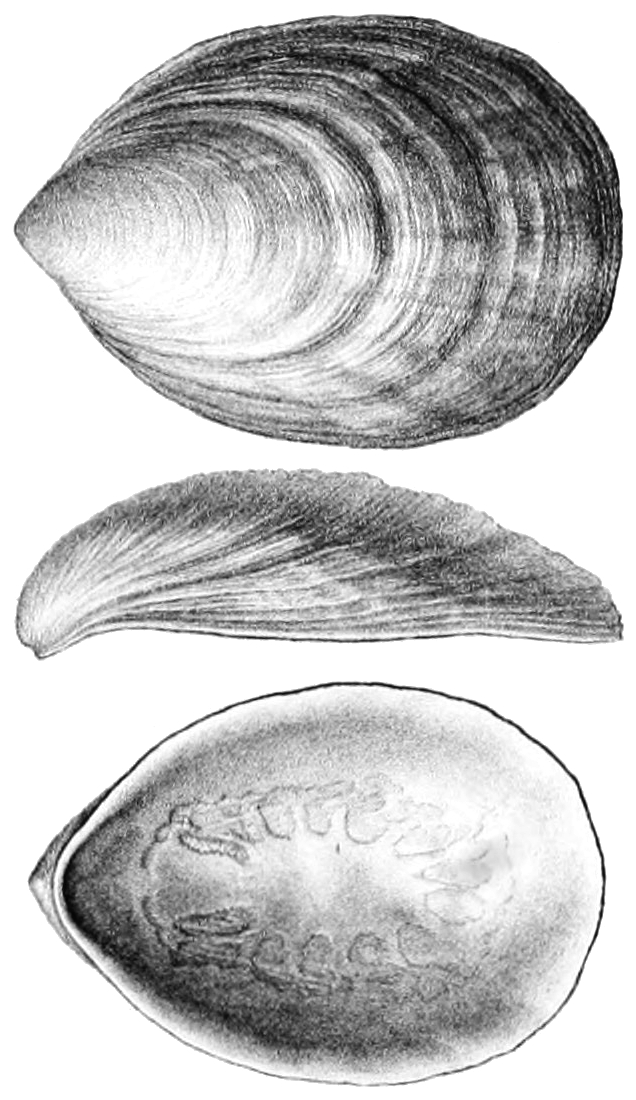
- Drawing of the shell of Pilina unguis. Head region is on the left.

Scientific classification
- Kingdom: Animalia
- Phylum: Mollusca
- Class: Monoplacophora
- Order: Tryblidiida
- Superfamily: Tryblidioidea
- Family: †Tryblidiidae; Zittel, 1899

= Tryblidiidae =

Tryblidiidae Temporal range: Ordovician-Silurian

Extinct family of molluscs

Tryblidiidae is an extinct family of paleozoic monoplacophorans in the superfamily Tryblidioidea.

== Genera ==
Genera in the family Tryblidiidae include:

- †Tryblidium Lindström, 1880. From Ordovician and Silurian.
- †Drahomira Perner, 1903
  - †Drahomira barrandei
  - †Drahomira glaseri
  - †Drahomira kriziana
  - †Drahomira rugata
- †Helcionopsis Ulrich & Scofield, 1897
- †Pentalina Horný, 1961
  - †Pentalina prantli Horný, 1961
- †Pilina
