= Gustaf Lindström =

Swedish paleontologist (1829–1901)

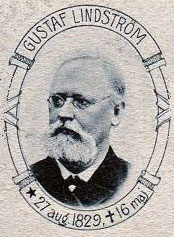
- Born: 27 August 1829; Visby, Sweden
- Died: 16 May 1901 (aged 71); Stockholm, Sweden
- Awards: Murchison Medal (1895)

Gustaf Lindström (27 August 1829 – 16 May 1901) was a Swedish paleontologist.

He was born in Visby on Gotland. In 1848 he entered Uppsala University, and in 1854 he took his doctor's degree. Having attended a course of lectures in Stockholm by Sven Lovén, he became interested in the zoology of the Baltic, and published several papers on the invertebrate fauna, and subsequently on the fishes. In 1856 he became a school teacher, and in 1858 a master in the grammar school at Visby.

His leisure was devoted to researches on the fossils of the Silurian rocks of Gotland, including the corals, brachiopods, gastropods including pteropods, cephalopods and Crustacea. He described also remains of the fish Cyathaspis from Wenlock Beds in Gotland, with Tamerlan Thorell, a scorpion Palaeaphonus from Ludlow Beds at Wisby. He determined the true nature of the operculated coral.

He was awarded the Murchison Medal by the Geological Society of London in 1895. In 1876 he was appointed professor and keeper of the Paleozoological department of the Swedish Museum of Natural History in Stockholm, where he died in 1901.

== Bibliography ==
- (in Latin) Angelin N. P. & Lindström G. 1880. Fragmenta Silurica e dono Caroli Henrici Wegelin. Opus studio Nicolai Petri Angelin Inchoatum Jussu et Impensis Academiae Regiae Scientarum Suecicae. Samson & Wallin (Holmiae), 60 pp.
- Lindström G. 1884. On the Silurian Gastropoda and Pteropoda of Gotland. Stockholm.
- Lindström G. 1899. Remarks on the Heliolitidae. Stockholm.
