= M. minuta =

M. minuta can refer to a few different species. The specific epithet minuta means "minute" or "small".

- Macrolopha minuta, a beetle in the genus Macrolopha
- Manuherikia minuta, an extinct species of duck
- Marchena minuta, a jumping spider
- Marsilea minuta, or dwarf waterclover, an aquatic fern
- Masdevallia minuta, an orchid in the genus Masdevallia
- Megasporoporia minuta, a crust fungus in the family Polyporaceae
- Melibe minuta, a nudibranch in the genus Melibe
- Melica minuta, a grass in the family Poaceae
- Metleucauge minuta, a spider in the genus Metleucauge
- Menegazzia minuta, a lichen in the family Parmeliaceae
- Miaenia minuta, a beetle in the family Cerambycidae
- Micronycteris minuta, the white-bellied big-eared bat
- Micropilina minuta, a mollusk in the genus Micropilina
- Microrape minuta, a moth of the family Megalopygidae
- Mimozotale minuta, a beetle in the family Cerambycidae
- Ministigmata minuta, a spider in the family Microstigmatidae
- Minutaleyrodes minuta, a whitefly in the family Aleyrodidae
- Minutargyrotoza minuta, a moth of the family Tortricidae
- Monomastix minuta, a green algae in the genus Monomastix
- Mordellistena minuta, a beetle in the family Mordellidae
- Mustela minuta, synonym for Palaeogale minuta, an extinct mammal in the genus Palaeogale
- Myolepta minuta, a hoverfly in the genus Myolepta
- Myriogramme minuta, a red algae in the genus Myriogramme
- Myrmekiaphila minuta, a trapdoor spider in the genus Myrmekiaphila
