= Rokopella segonzaci =

Scientific classification
- Kingdom: Animalia
- Phylum: Mollusca
- Class: Monoplacophora
- Order: Neopilinida
- Family: Neopilinidae
- Genus: Rokopella
- Species: R. segonzaci

Binomial name
- Rokopella segonzaci Warén & Bouchet, 2001

Species of monoplacophoran

Rokopella segonzaci is a species of monoplacophoran, a superficially limpet-like marine mollusc.
