= Micropilina arntzi =

Scientific classification
- Domain: Eukaryota
- Kingdom: Animalia
- Phylum: Mollusca
- Class: Monoplacophora
- Order: Tryblidiida
- Family: Micropilinidae
- Genus: Micropilina
- Species: M. arntzi

Binomial name
- Micropilina arntzi Warén & Hain, 1992

Species of monoplacophoran

Micropilina arntzi is a species of monoplacophoran, a superficially limpet-like marine mollusc. It is found off the coast of Antarctica. It has three pairs of gills.

== Anatomy ==
Micropilina arntzi has three pairs of gills, three pairs of nephridia ("kidneys"), six irregularly coiled intestinal loops, two pairs of oesophageal pouches, and no heart.
