= Rokopella goesi =

Scientific classification
- Domain: Eukaryota
- Kingdom: Animalia
- Phylum: Mollusca
- Class: Monoplacophora
- Order: Neopilinida
- Family: Neopilinidae
- Genus: Rokopella
- Species: R. goesi

Binomial name
- Rokopella goesi Warén, 1988

Species of monoplacophoran

Rokopella goesi is a species of monoplacophoran, a superficially limpet-like marine mollusc.
