= Minaret Formation =

Limestone formation in Antarctica

- Stratigraphic range: Guzhangian-Cambrian Stage 10 (Merioneth-Dresbachian); ~500–488 Ma
- Minaret Formation (Antarctica)
- Type: Geological formation
- Unit of: Heritage Group
- Underlies: Crashsite Group; Howard Nunataks Formation
- Overlies: Liberty Hills & Springer Peak Formations
- Thickness: Up to 600 m (2,000 ft)

Lithology
- Primary: Limestone

Location
- Coordinates: 79.4°S 84.8°W
- Region: Ellsworth Land
- Country: Antarctica
- Extent: Ellsworth Mountains, Yochelson Ridge & Heritage Range
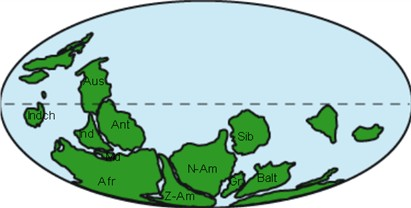
- Paleogeography of the Cambrian with the supercontinent Pannotia and Antarctica south of the paleo-equator

The Minaret Formation is a Late Cambrian limestone formation of the Heritage Group of Antarctica. The age of the formation is established to be Guzhangian to Cambrian Stage 10 (or Merioneth to Dresbachian in the regional stratigraphy), dated at ranging from 500 to 488 Ma.

The formation has provided the first known Late Cambrian archaeocyathid, and Knightoconus antarcticus, an ancestor to the cephalopods.

== Description ==
The Minaret Formation forms a discontinuous limestone unit exposed from Webers Peaks in the northern Heritage Range to the Independence Hills in Horseshoe Valley of the Ellsworth Mountains. At Mount Rosenthal, at the head of Horseshoe Valley, the Minaret Formation is formed predominantly of white to pale grey micritic limestone with thin, discrete interbeds of oolitic and oncolithic grainstones.

The Minaret Formation is the uppermost formation of the Heritage Group, overlying the Liberty Hills and Springer Peak Formations. The formation is overlain by the Howard Nunataks Formation of the Crashsite Group. The formation reaches a thickness of 600 metres (2,000 ft) in the south of its extent. The formation ranges from shallow to deep marine. The Minaret fauna contains the first known Late Cambrian archaeocyathid. During the final stages of Gondwanian deformation, structureless and stratified post-cleavage breccia bodies formed in the carbonate lithologies of the Minaret Formation, due to cave-like dissolution processes and contemporaneous low temperature hydrothermal activity.

== Fossil content ==
The reefal limestones of the formation have provided fossils:

- Antarcticocyathus webersi
- Gastropods
  - Strepsodiscus splettstoesseri
- Conodonts
  - Furnishina furnishi
  - F. quadrata
  - F. ?asymmetrica
  - Proacodus tenuis
  - Phakelodus sp.
  - Westergaardodina bicuspidata
  - W. moessebergensis
  - W. tricuspidata
- Tergomya
  - Aremellia batteni
  - Ellsworthoconus andersoni
  - Kirengella pyramidalis
  - Knightoconus antarcticus
  - Proconus incertis
  - Proplina rutfordi
- Rostroconchia
  - Apoptopegma craddocki
  - Cosminoconella runnegari
- Paragastropoda
  - Matherella antarctica
  - Ribeiria australiensis
  - Scaevogyra thompsoni
  - ?Kobayashiella heritagensis

== See also ==
- List of fossiliferous stratigraphic units in Antarctica
- Geology of Antarctica
- Shackleton Limestone, Cambrian fossiliferous limestone of Antarctica
