= Rokopella oligotropha =

Scientific classification
- Domain: Eukaryota
- Kingdom: Animalia
- Phylum: Mollusca
- Class: Monoplacophora
- Order: Neopilinida
- Family: Neopilinidae
- Genus: Rokopella
- Species: R. oligotropha

Binomial name
- Rokopella oligotropha Rokop, 1972

Species of monoplacophoran

Rokopella oligotropha is a species of monoplacophoran, a superficially limpet-like marine mollusc. It is known from only one specimen and a shell fragment collected in the north-central Pacific Ocean.
