= Rokopella euglypta =

Scientific classification
- Domain: Eukaryota
- Kingdom: Animalia
- Phylum: Mollusca
- Class: Monoplacophora
- Order: Neopilinida
- Family: Neopilinidae
- Genus: Rokopella
- Species: R. euglypta

Binomial name
- Rokopella euglypta (Dautzenberg & Fischer, 1897)

Synonyms
- Acmaea euglypta Dautzenberg & H. Fischer, 1897

Species of monoplacophoran

Rokopella euglypta is a species of monoplacophoran, a superficially limpet-like marine mollusc.
