= Rokopella brummeri =

Scientific classification
- Domain: Eukaryota
- Kingdom: Animalia
- Phylum: Mollusca
- Class: Monoplacophora
- Order: Neopilinida
- Family: Neopilinidae
- Genus: Rokopella
- Species: R. brummeri

Binomial name
- Rokopella brummeri Goud & Gittenberger, 1993

Species of monoplacophoran

Rokopella brummeri is a species of monoplacophoran, a superficially limpet-like marine mollusc. It is found in the northern Atlantic Ocean.
