= Vema levinae =

Scientific classification
- Domain: Eukaryota
- Kingdom: Animalia
- Phylum: Mollusca
- Class: Monoplacophora
- Order: Neopilinida
- Family: Neopilinidae
- Genus: Vema
- Species: V. levinae

Binomial name
- Vema levinae Warén, 1996

Species of monoplacophoran

Vema levinae is a species of monoplacophoran, a superficially limpet-like marine mollusc.
