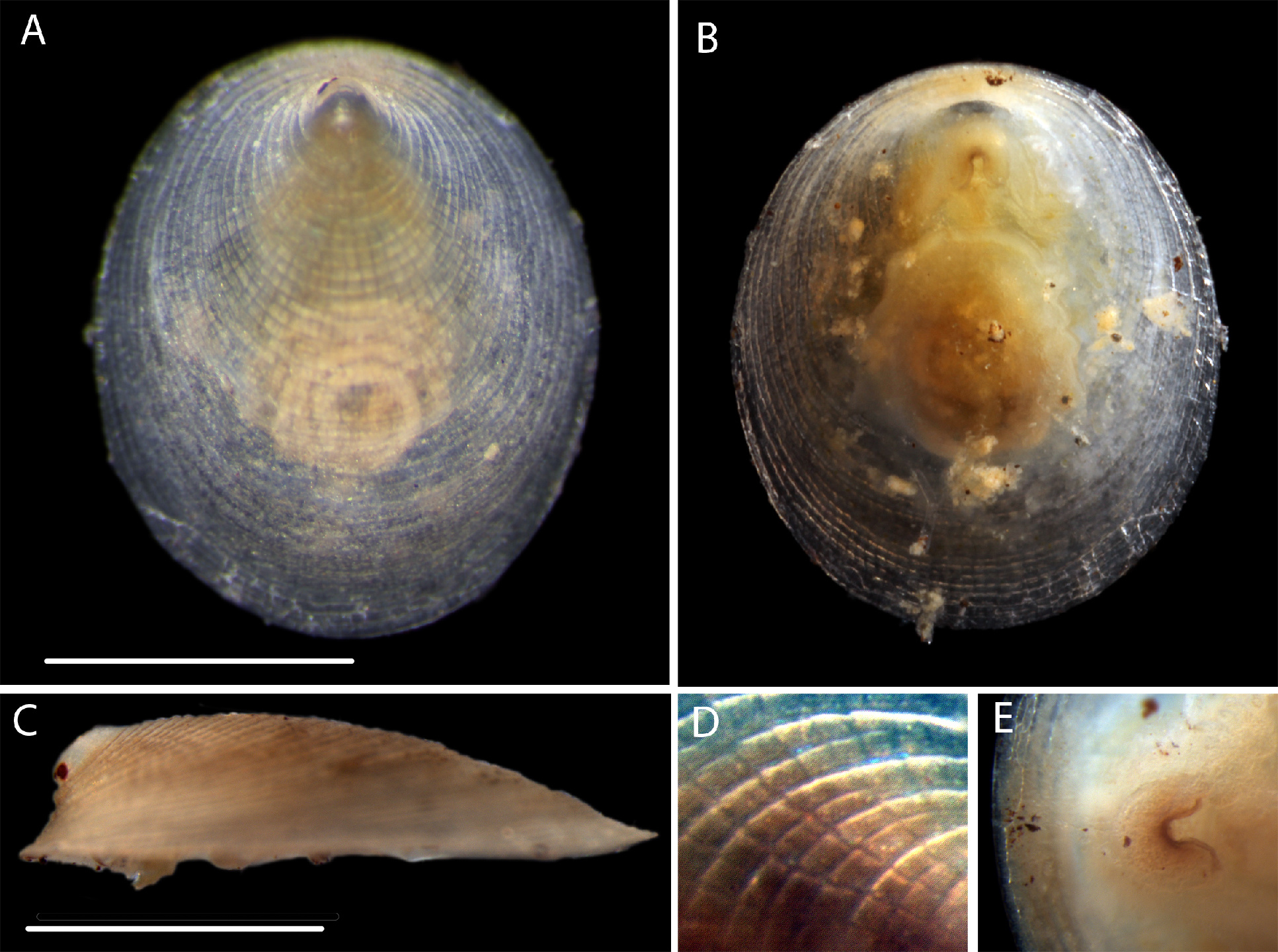

Scientific classification
- Domain: Eukaryota
- Kingdom: Animalia
- Phylum: Mollusca
- Class: Monoplacophora
- Order: Neopilinida
- Family: Neopilinidae
- Genus: Veleropilina
- Species: V. oligotropha

Binomial name
- Veleropilina oligotropha Rokop, 1972

= Veleropilina oligotropha =

Species of monoplacophoran

Veleropilina oligotropha is a species of monoplacophoran, a superficially limpet-like marine mollusc. It is found in the Pacific Ocean to the north of Hawaii.
