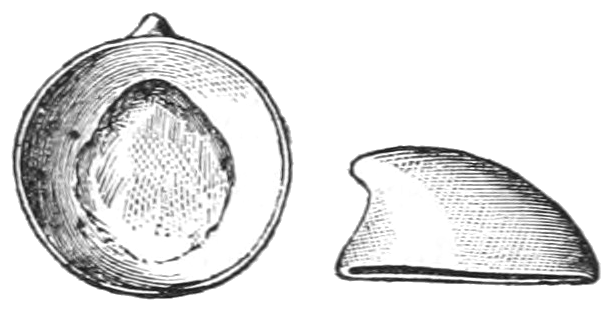
- 1865 drawing of Archinacella instabilis by Elkanah Billings.

Scientific classification
- Kingdom: Animalia
- Phylum: Mollusca
- Class: Gastropoda
- Superfamily: †Archinacelloidea
- Family: †Archinacellidae; Knight, 1952

Genera
- see text

= Archinacellidae =

Archinacellidae Temporal range: Middle Ordovician–Late Ordovician Middle Ordovician - Late Ordovician (range for the genus Archinacella)

Extinct family of gastropods

Archinacellidae is an extinct family of paleozoic molluscs of uncertain position (Gastropoda or Monoplacophora).

== Description ==
These are cap-shaped fossil shells.

== Taxonomy ==
The taxonomy of the Gastropoda by Bouchet & Rocroi, 2005 categorizes Archinacellidae in the superfamilia Archinacelloidea within the Paleozoic molluscs of uncertain systematic position. This family has no subfamilies.

== Genera ==
Genera in the family Archinacellidae include:

- Archinacella Ulrich & Scofield, 1897 – type genus of the family Archinacellidae
  - Archinacella powersi Ulrich & Scofield, 1897 – type species
  - Archinacella instabilis (Billings, 1865)
- Barrandicella Peel & Horný, 1999
- Barrandicellopsis Horný, 2000
  - Barrandicellopsis ovata – synonym: Archinacella ovata Barrande in Perner, 1903 – Archinacella ovata var. elevata Barrande in Perner, 1903 – type species, Middle Ordovician from Bohemia
  - Barrandicellopsis extenuata – synonym: Orthonychia extenuata Barrande in Perner, 1903 – probably belongs to genus Barrandicellopsis, Middle Ordovician from Bohemia
