= Vema occidua =

Scientific classification
- Domain: Eukaryota
- Kingdom: Animalia
- Phylum: Mollusca
- Class: Monoplacophora
- Order: Neopilinida
- Family: Neopilinidae
- Genus: Vema
- Species: V. occidua

Binomial name
- Vema occidua Marshall, 2006

Species of monoplacophoran

Vema occidua is a species of monoplacophoran, a superficially limpet-like marine mollusc.
