= Micropilina reingi =

Scientific classification
- Domain: Eukaryota
- Kingdom: Animalia
- Phylum: Mollusca
- Class: Monoplacophora
- Order: Tryblidiida
- Family: Micropilinidae
- Genus: Micropilina
- Species: M. reingi

Binomial name
- Micropilina reingi Marshall, 2006

Species of monoplacophoran

Micropilina reingi is a species of monoplacophoran, a superficially limpet-like marine mollusc. It is found off the coast of New Zealand.
