= Veleropilina seisuimaruae =

Scientific classification
- Domain: Eukaryota
- Kingdom: Animalia
- Phylum: Mollusca
- Class: Monoplacophora
- Order: Neopilinida
- Family: Neopilinidae
- Genus: Veleropilina
- Species: V. seisuimaruae

Binomial name
- Veleropilina seisuimaruae Kano, S. Kimura, T. Kimura & Warén, 2012

Species of monoplacophoran

Veleropilina seisuimaruae is a species of monoplacophoran, a superficially limpet-like marine mollusc. A single specimen was found off the coast of Shima Peninsula of Honshu, Japan in 2009.
