= Laevipilina rolani =

Scientific classification
- Kingdom: Animalia
- Phylum: Mollusca
- Class: Monoplacophora
- Order: Neopilinida
- Family: Neopilinidae
- Genus: Laevipilina
- Species: L. rolani

Binomial name
- Laevipilina rolani Warén & Bouchet, 1990

Species of monoplacophoran

Laevipilina rolani is a species of monoplacophoran, a superficially limpet-like marine mollusk. It is found off the northern coast of Spain.

== Taxonomy and etymology ==
The species was formally described by malacologists Anders Warén and Philippe Bouchet in 1990. It is named in honor of the prominent Spanish malacologist Emilio Rolán.

Taxonomically, Laevipilina rolani belongs to the class Monoplacophora, a group of primitive mollusks that were long considered extinct until living specimens were discovered in the mid-20th century. Its current taxonomic classification places it within the genus Laevipilina and the family Neopilinidae.
