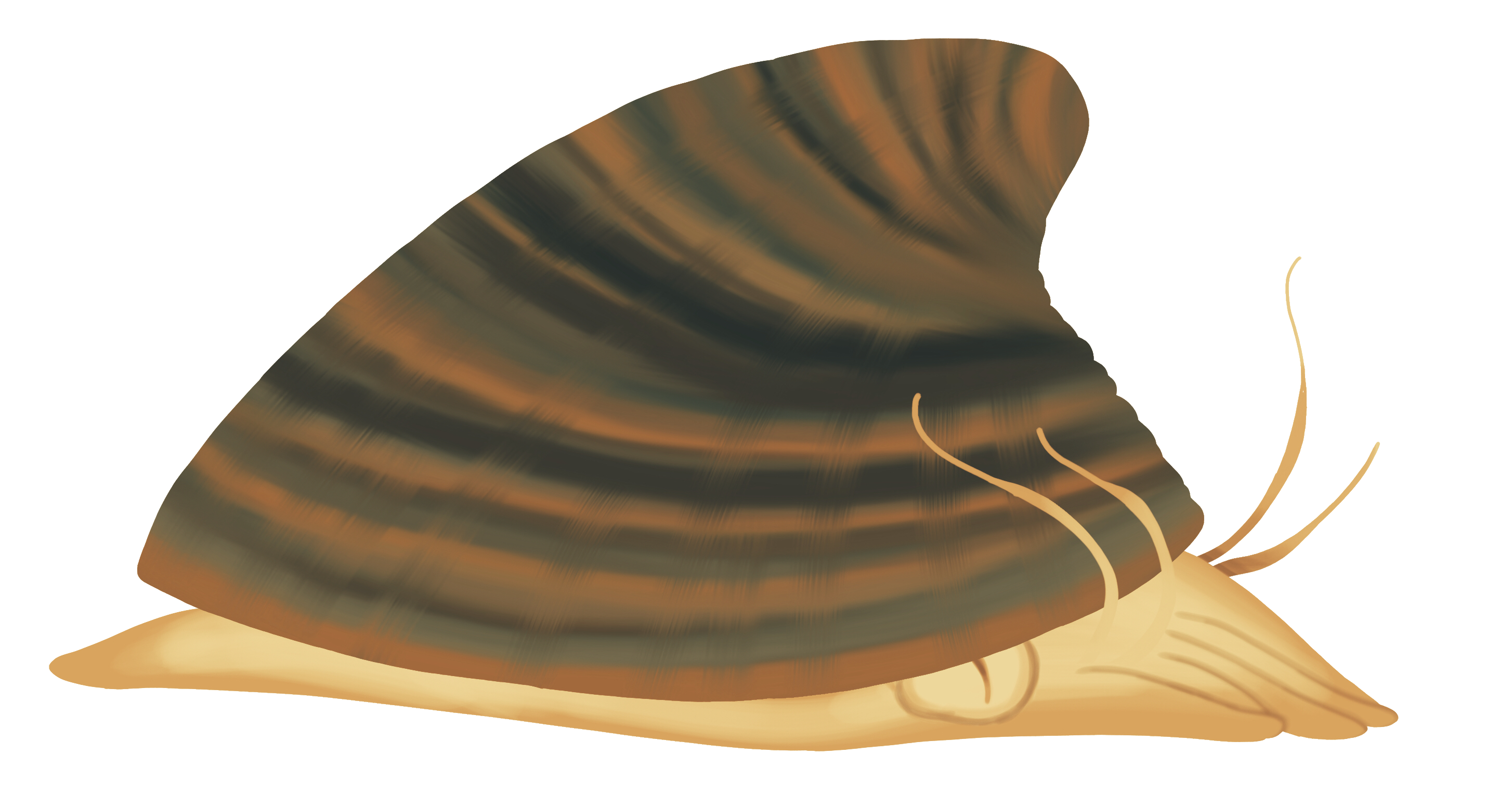
- Artistic reconstruction of Knightoconus antarcticus

Scientific classification
- Domain: Eukaryota
- Kingdom: Animalia
- Phylum: Mollusca
- Class: Monoplacophora
- Order: †Archinacelloidea
- Genus: †Knightoconus; Yochelson et al., 1973
- Species: †K. antarcticus

Binomial name
- †Knightoconus antarcticus Yochelson et al., 1973

= Knightoconus =

Knightoconus Temporal range: Dresbachian ~497–487 Ma

Extinct genus of molluscs

Knightoconus antarcticus is an extinct species of fossil monoplacophoran from the Cambrian Minaret Formation of Antarctica. It is thought to represent an ancestor to the cephalopods. It had a chambered conical shell, but lacked a siphuncle.

== Taxonomic debate ==
The absence of a siphuncle in K. antarcticus has been taken as evidence against its being an ancestor of cephalopods, as factors that would allow a siphuncle to penetrate preexisting septal chambers remain unknown. The prevailing argument suggests that a strand of tissue remained attached to the previous septum as the mollusc moved forwards and deposited its next septum, stopping that new septum from closing completely and becoming mineralised itself.

Ten or more septa are found in mature individuals, occupying around a third of the shell – septa form very early and have been found in specimens as small as 2 mm in length. Unlike monoplacophoran fossils, there is no evidence of muscle scarring in Knightoconus fossils. Scars from the closely related Hypseloconus have been used to determine its orientation. Knightoconus started life with an exogastric shell that became endogastric as the organism grew.

An alternate taxonomy is: Tergomya: Kiringellida: Hypseloconidae.

== See also ==
- Evolutionary history of cephalopods
- Plectronoceras
