= Laevipilina theresae =

Scientific classification
- Domain: Eukaryota
- Kingdom: Animalia
- Phylum: Mollusca
- Class: Monoplacophora
- Order: Neopilinida
- Family: Neopilinidae
- Genus: Laevipilina
- Species: L. theresae

Binomial name
- Laevipilina theresae Schrödl, 2006

Species of monoplacophoran

Laevipilina theresae is a species of monoplacophoran, a superficially limpet-like marine mollusk. It is known from a live specimen collected in the Eastern Weddell Sea of Antarctica.

The shell of Laevipilina theresae measures 2.5 mm × 2.1 mm (0.098 in × 0.083 in).
