= Veleropilina segonzaci =

Conservation status
- Least Concern (IUCN 3.1)

Scientific classification
- Kingdom: Animalia
- Phylum: Mollusca
- Class: Monoplacophora
- Order: Neopilinida
- Family: Neopilinidae
- Genus: Veleropilina
- Species: V. segonzaci

Binomial name
- Veleropilina segonzaci Warén & Bouchet, 2001

Species of monoplacophoran

Veleropilina segonzaci is a species of monoplacophoran, a superficially limpet-like marine mollusc. It is found on the Mid-Atlantic Ridge.

== Anatomy ==
It has only three pairs of gills, instead of five pairs as in all other Veleropilina species with known anatomies.
