= Micropilina rakiura =

Conservation status
- Naturally Uncommon (NZ TCS)

Scientific classification
- Kingdom: Animalia
- Phylum: Mollusca
- Class: Monoplacophora
- Order: Tryblidiida
- Family: Micropilinidae
- Genus: Micropilina
- Species: M. rakiura

Binomial name
- Micropilina rakiura Marshall, 1998

Species of monoplacophoran

Micropilina rakiura is a species of monoplacophoran, a superficially limpet-like marine mollusc. It was first described by Bruce A. Marshall in 1998 and is found off the coast of New Zealand.
