= Veleropilina reticulata =

Scientific classification
- Domain: Eukaryota
- Kingdom: Animalia
- Phylum: Mollusca
- Class: Monoplacophora
- Order: Neopilinida
- Family: Neopilinidae
- Genus: Veleropilina
- Species: V. reticulata

Binomial name
- Veleropilina reticulata Seguenza, 1876

Species of monoplacophoran

Veleropilina reticulata is a species of monoplacophoran, a superficially limpet-like marine mollusc. It is found off the coast of Italy in the Mediterranean Sea.
