= Neopilina starobogatovi =

Scientific classification
- Domain: Eukaryota
- Kingdom: Animalia
- Phylum: Mollusca
- Class: Monoplacophora
- Order: Neopilinida
- Family: Neopilinidae
- Genus: Neopilina
- Species: N. starobogatovi

Binomial name
- Neopilina starobogatovi Ivanov & Moskalev, 2007

Species of monoplacophoran

Neopilina starobogatovi is a species of monoplacophoran, a superficially limpet-like marine mollusc. It is named after Yaroslav Starobogatov.
