= Laevipilina antarctica =

Scientific classification
- Domain: Eukaryota
- Kingdom: Animalia
- Phylum: Mollusca
- Class: Monoplacophora
- Order: Neopilinida
- Family: Neopilinidae
- Genus: Laevipilina
- Species: L. antarctica

Binomial name
- Laevipilina antarctica Warén & Hain, 1992

Species of monoplacophoran

Laevipilina antarctica is a species of monoplacophoran, a superficially limpet-like marine mollusc. It is found in the Weddell Sea and the Lazarev Sea of Antarctica.

== Evolution ==
In 2006, a molecular study on Laevipilina antarctica suggested that extant Monoplacophora and Polyplacophora form a well-supported clade with the researched Neopilina closest to the chitons. The two classes in this new clade, with the proposed name Serialia, all show a variable number of serially repeated gills and eight sets of dorsoventral pedal retractor muscles.
