= Veleropilina goesi =

Scientific classification
- Domain: Eukaryota
- Kingdom: Animalia
- Phylum: Mollusca
- Class: Monoplacophora
- Order: Neopilinida
- Family: Neopilinidae
- Genus: Veleropilina
- Species: V. goesi

Binomial name
- Veleropilina goesi Warén, 1988

Species of monoplacophoran

Veleropilina goesi is a species of monoplacophoran, a superficially limpet-like marine mollusc. It is found off the Virgin Islands in the Caribbean Sea.
