= Veleropilina euglypta =

Scientific classification
- Domain: Eukaryota
- Kingdom: Animalia
- Phylum: Mollusca
- Class: Monoplacophora
- Order: Neopilinida
- Family: Neopilinidae
- Genus: Veleropilina
- Species: V. euglypta

Binomial name
- Veleropilina euglypta Dautzenberg & H. Fischer, 1897

Species of monoplacophoran

Veleropilina euglypta is a species of monoplacophoran, a superficially limpet-like marine mollusc. It is found in the Mid-Atlantic, off the Azores archipelago.
