= Neopilina rebainsi =

Scientific classification
- Kingdom: Animalia
- Phylum: Mollusca
- Class: Monoplacophora
- Order: Neopilinida
- Family: Neopilinidae
- Genus: Neopilina
- Species: N. rebainsi

Binomial name
- Neopilina rebainsi Moskalev, Starobogatov & Filatova, 1983

Species of monoplacophoran

Neopilina rebainsi is a species of superficially limpet-like marine mollusc belonging to the class monoplacophora. The holotype was collected southeast of the Falkland Islands in the Southern Atlantic Ocean. They are dioecious organisms.
