= Laevipilina hyalina =

Scientific classification
- Domain: Eukaryota
- Kingdom: Animalia
- Phylum: Mollusca
- Class: Monoplacophora
- Order: Neopilinida
- Family: Neopilinidae
- Genus: Laevipilina
- Species: L. hyalina

Binomial name
- Laevipilina hyalina McLean, 1979

Species of monoplacophoran

Laevipilina hyalina is a species of monoplacophoran, a superficially limpet-like marine mollusk. It is found off the coast of southern California.

== Anatomy ==
L. hyalina is the only Laevipilina species with 6 pairs of gills, while all other Laevipilina species have 5 pairs.
