= Vema (mollusc) =

Scientific classification
- Domain: Eukaryota
- Kingdom: Animalia
- Phylum: Mollusca
- Class: Monoplacophora
- Order: Neopilinida
- Family: Neopilinidae
- Genus: Vema; Clarke & Menzies, 1959

Genus of molluscs

Vema is a genus of deep-sea molluscs, monoplacophorans. The genus is named after the oceanographic Research Vessel Vema.

All Vema species have six pairs of gills.

== Species ==
- Vema bacescui (Menzies, 1968)
- Vema ewingi (Clarke & Menzies, 1959)
- Vema levinae Warén, 1996
- Vema occidua B. A. Marshall, 2006
