= Neopilina bruuni =

Scientific classification
- Domain: Eukaryota
- Kingdom: Animalia
- Phylum: Mollusca
- Class: Monoplacophora
- Order: Neopilinida
- Family: Neopilinidae
- Genus: Neopilina
- Species: N. bruuni

Binomial name
- Neopilina bruuni Menzies, 1968

Species of monoplacophoran

Neopilina bruuni is a species of monoplacophoran, a superficially limpet-like marine mollusc. It is found in the southeastern Pacific Ocean, off the coast of South America.
