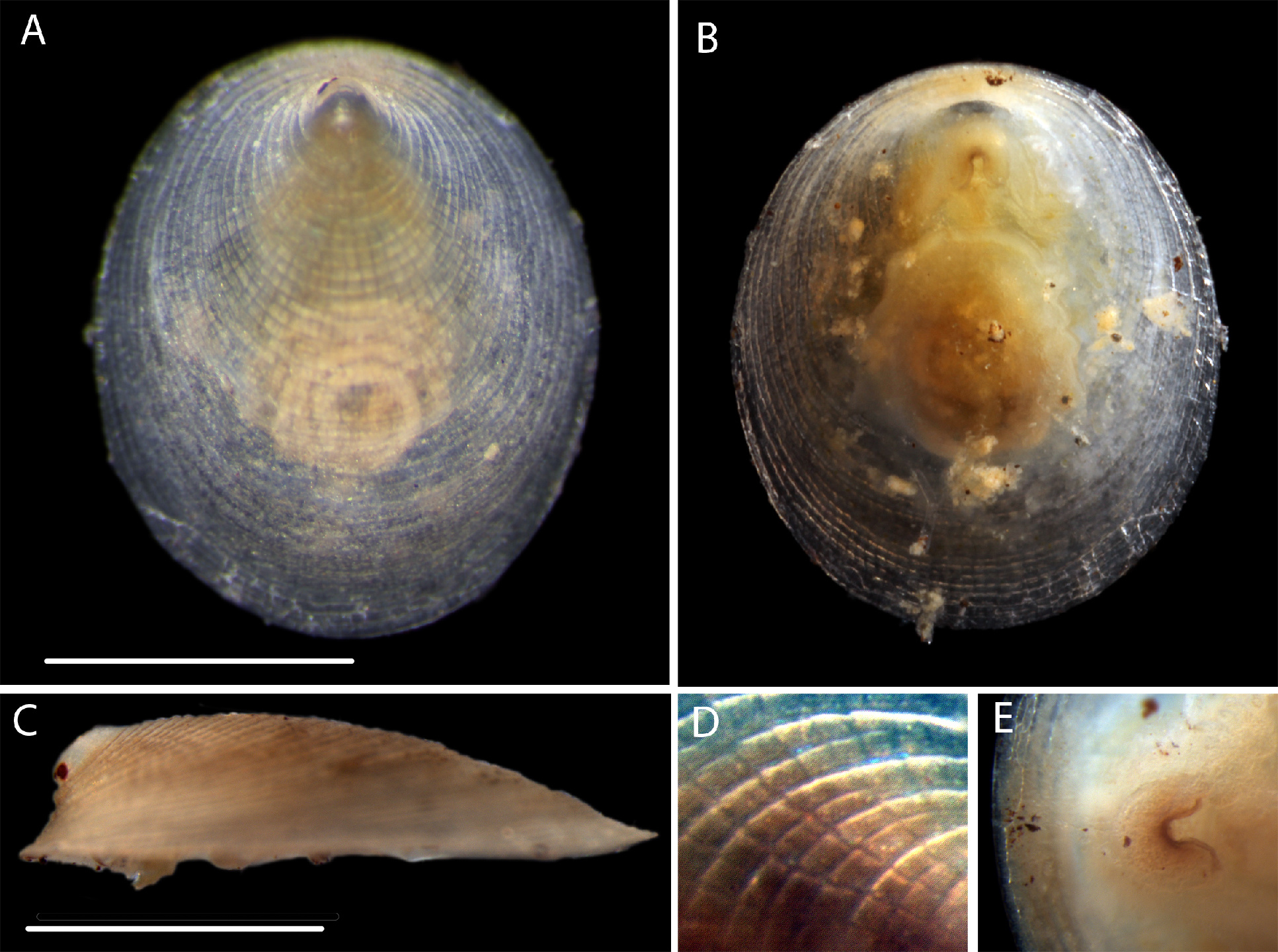
- Veleropilina oligotropha

Scientific classification
- Domain: Eukaryota
- Kingdom: Animalia
- Phylum: Mollusca
- Class: Monoplacophora
- Order: Neopilinida
- Family: Neopilinidae
- Genus: Veleropilina; Starobogatov & Moskalev, 1987

= Veleropilina =

Veleropilina Temporal range: Pleistocene–Recent

Extinct genus of molluscs

Veleropilina is a living genus of monoplacophoran, once described as a limpet, and is known from fossil deposits.

== Species ==
- Veleropilina brummeri (Goud & Gittenberger, 1993)
- Veleropilina capulus (B. A. Marshall, 2006)
- Veleropilina euglypta (Dautzenberg & H. Fischer, 1897)
- Veleropilina goesi (Warén, 1988)
- Veleropilina oligotropha (Rokop, 1972)
- Veleropilina reticulata (Seguenza, 1876)
- Veleropilina segonzaci (Warén & Bouchet, 2001)
- Veleropilina seisuimaruae Kano, S. Kimura, T. Kimura & Warén, 2012
- Veleropilina veleronis (Menzies & Layton, 1963)
- Veleropilina zografi (Dautzenberg & H. Fischer, 1896)
