= Micropilina tangaroa =

Conservation status
- Naturally Uncommon (NZ TCS)

Scientific classification
- Kingdom: Animalia
- Phylum: Mollusca
- Class: Monoplacophora
- Order: Tryblidiida
- Family: Micropilinidae
- Genus: Micropilina
- Species: M. tangaroa

Binomial name
- Micropilina tangaroa Marshall, 1990

Species of monoplacophoran

Micropilina tangaroa is a species of monoplacophoran, a superficially limpet-like marine mollusc. It was first described by Bruce Anders Marshall in 1990. It is known from a single specimen found off the coast of New Zealand.
