= Archaeopragidae =

Scientific classification
- Kingdom: Animalia
- Phylum: Mollusca
- Class: Gastropoda
- Superfamily: †Archinacelloidea
- Family: †Archaeopragidae; Horný, 1963

Genera
- See text

Extinct family of gastropods

Archaeopragidae is an extinct family of paleozoic molluscs of uncertain position (Gastropoda or Monoplacophora).

== Taxonomy ==
The taxonomy of the Gastropoda by Bouchet & Rocroi, 2005 categorizes Archaeopragidae in the superfamilia Archinacelloidea within the Paleozoic molluscs of uncertain systematic position. This family has no subfamilies.

== Genera ==
Genera in the family Archaeopragidae include:

- Archaeopraga Horný, 1963 - type genus of the family Archaeopragidae
