= Vema ewingi =

Scientific classification
- Domain: Eukaryota
- Kingdom: Animalia
- Phylum: Mollusca
- Class: Monoplacophora
- Order: Neopilinida
- Family: Neopilinidae
- Genus: Vema
- Species: V. ewingi

Binomial name
- Vema ewingi Clarke & Menzies, 1959

Species of monoplacophoran

Vema ewingi is a species of monoplacophoran, a superficially limpet-like marine mollusc. It is found at the northern end of the Peru-Chile Trench and other locations off the coast of Peru.
