= Micropilina minuta =

Scientific classification
- Domain: Eukaryota
- Kingdom: Animalia
- Phylum: Mollusca
- Class: Monoplacophora
- Order: Tryblidiida
- Family: Micropilinidae
- Genus: Micropilina
- Species: M. minuta

Binomial name
- Micropilina minuta Warén, 1989

Species of monoplacophoran

Micropilina minuta is a species of monoplacophoran, a superficially limpet-like marine mollusc. It has been found off the coasts of Iceland and Italy.

== Anatomy ==
Micropilina minuta has four pairs of gills, four pairs of nephridia ("kidneys"), five circular horizontal intestinal loops, one pair of oesophageal pouches, no heart, and densely packed internal organs. Its maximum length is 1.5 mm.
