= Veleropilina brummeri =

Scientific classification
- Domain: Eukaryota
- Kingdom: Animalia
- Phylum: Mollusca
- Class: Monoplacophora
- Order: Neopilinida
- Family: Neopilinidae
- Genus: Veleropilina
- Species: V. brummeri

Binomial name
- Veleropilina brummeri Goud & Gittenberger, 1993

Species of monoplacophoran

Veleropilina brummeri is a species of monoplacophoran, a superficially limpet-like marine mollusc. It is found on the Mid-Atlantic Ridge.
