= Veleropilina zografi =

Scientific classification
- Domain: Eukaryota
- Kingdom: Animalia
- Phylum: Mollusca
- Class: Monoplacophora
- Order: Neopilinida
- Family: Neopilinidae
- Genus: Veleropilina
- Species: V. zografi

Binomial name
- Veleropilina zografi (Dautzenberg & Fischer H., 1896)

Synonyms
- Acmaea zografi Dautzenberg & Fischer, 1896; Neopilina zografi (Dautzenberg & Fischer, 1896); Acmaea euglypta Dautzenberg & Fischer, 1897

Species of monoplacophoran

Veleropilina zografi is a species of deep-sea (bathyal) monoplacophoran, a superficially limpet-like marine mollusc from the Atlantic Ocean. When this species was named it was thought to be a true limpet.

== Original description ==
In 1896, this species was described as Acmaea zografi by Philippe Dautzenberg and H. Fischer from an area near the Azores. It was at that point thought to be an archaeogastropod (i.e. a true limpet).

Bouchet, Mclean & Warén (1983) revealed 87 years later that this species is in fact a monoplacophoran.

== Distribution ==
This species occurs in the Atlantic Ocean in the Azores area.
