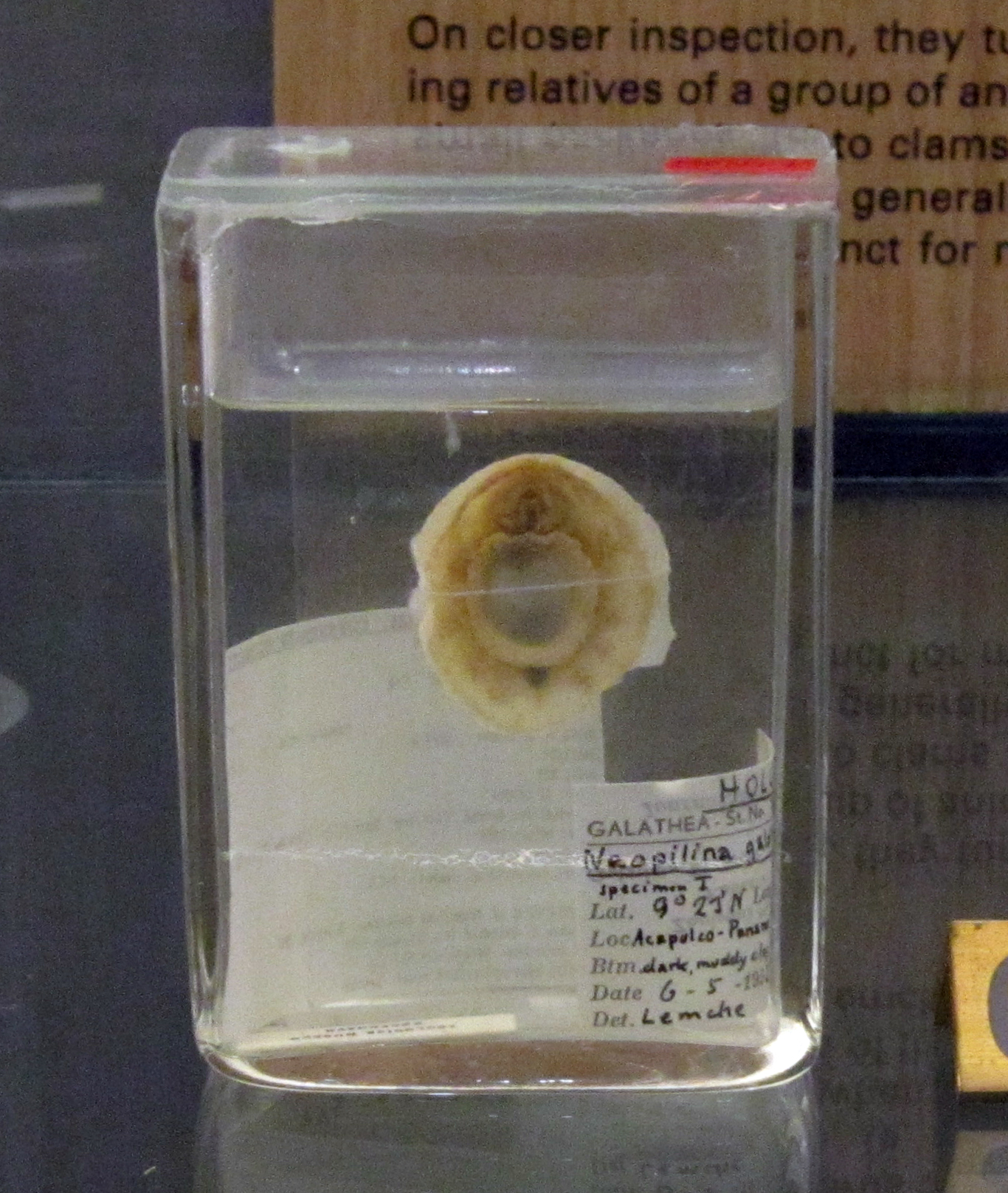
- The holotype of N. galatheae at the Zoological Museum, Copenhagen

Scientific classification
- Kingdom: Animalia
- Phylum: Mollusca
- Class: Monoplacophora
- Order: Neopilinida
- Family: Neopilinidae
- Genus: Neopilina
- Species: N. galatheae

Binomial name
- Neopilina galatheae Lemche, 1957

= Neopilina galatheae =

Species of monoplacophoran

Neopilina galatheae is a species of monoplacophoran, a superficially limpet-like marine mollusc. The generic name means "new Pilina" (after an extinct monoplacophoran species), while the specific name references the second Galathea expedition, during which it was described 1952. It lives in depths of 5000 meters and the shell is 3 centimeters in length in adults.

The species was discovered off the Pacific coast of Costa Rica in the 1950s, where 10 specimens were collected. Later, additional specimens have been collected off the coast of Chile and off Cabo San Lucas, Baja California, Mexico. The species was the first living monoplacophoran to be discovered; previously the taxon had been considered extinct for 375 million years. Shortly after its description, the discovery of the species was described as "a zoological discovery of the first order".

Recently, a Monoplacophoran species was found on the Galapagos Spreading Center on October 28, 2023, and was later identified as a Neopilina galatheae. It was found living on both hard lava surfaces and soft sediments, suggesting that this species can inhabit a wide range of seafloor environments.
