= Laevipilina cachuchensis =

Scientific classification
- Domain: Eukaryota
- Kingdom: Animalia
- Phylum: Mollusca
- Class: Monoplacophora
- Order: Neopilinida
- Family: Neopilinidae
- Genus: Laevipilina
- Species: L. cachuchensis

Binomial name
- Laevipilina cachuchensis Urgorri, García-Álvarez & Luque, 2005

Species of monoplacophoran

Laevipilina cachuchensis is a species of monoplacophoran, a superficially limpet-like marine mollusk. Two live specimens were collected off the coast of Asturias, northern Spain during the Fauna Ibérica II expedition in 1991.
