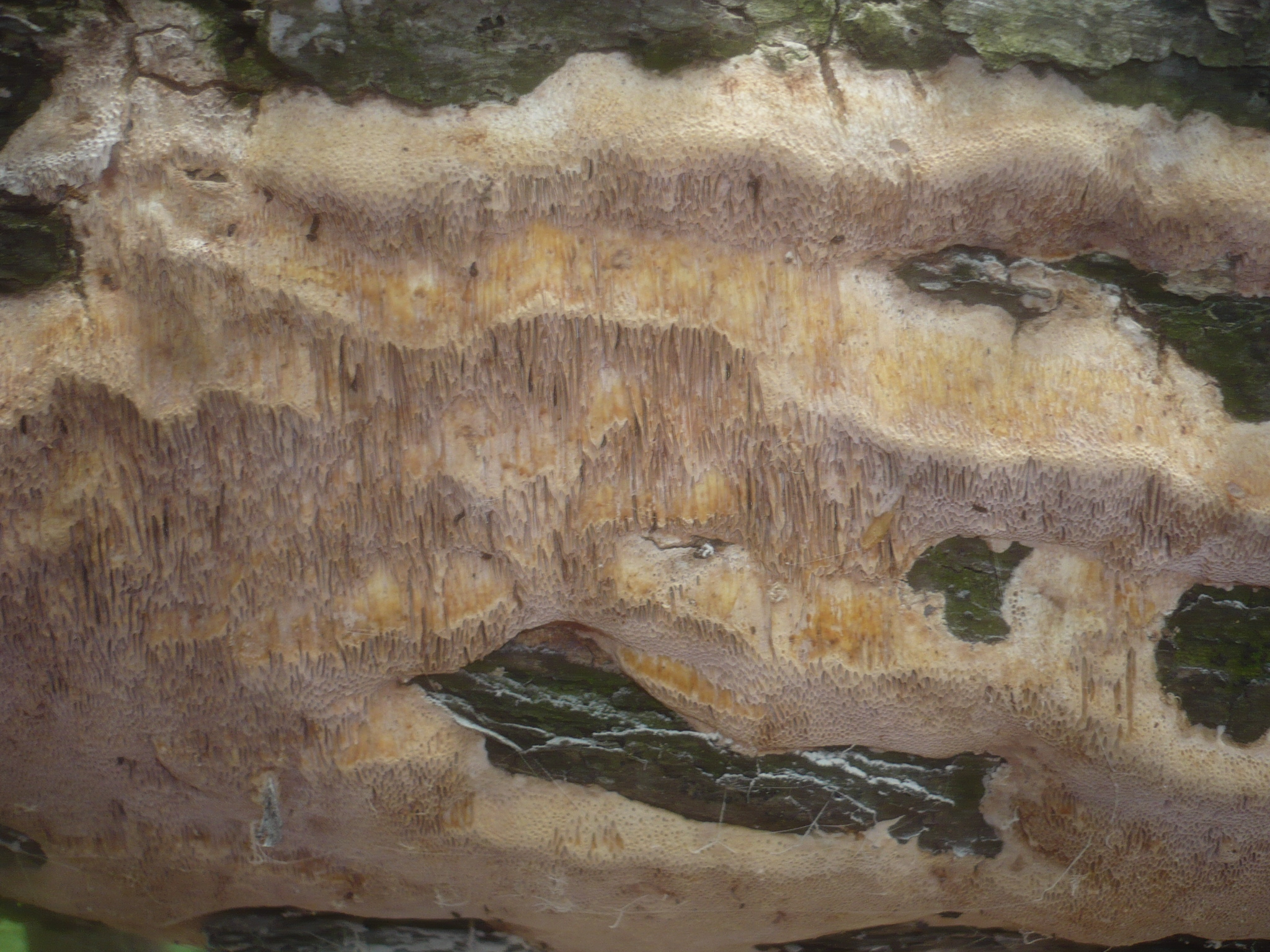
- Pachykytospora tuberculosa, Austria

Scientific classification
- Kingdom: Fungi
- Division: Basidiomycota
- Class: Agaricomycetes
- Order: Polyporales
- Family: Polyporaceae
- Genus: Pachykytospora; Kotl. & Pouzar (1963)

Type species
- Pachykytospora tuberculosa (Fr.) Kotl. & Pouzar (1963)

Species
- P. alabamae; P. papyracea; P. tuberculosa; P. wasseri

Synonyms
- Haploporus sect. Pachykytospora (Kotl. & Pouzar) Piątek (2005)

= Pachykytospora =

Genus of fungi

Pachykytospora is a small genus of poroid fungi in the family Polyporaceae. Species in the cosmopolitan genus cause white rot. There are about 10 species in the genus, with newest member described from European Russia in 2007. Pachykytospora species have fruit bodies that are resupinate (growing flat on the substrate surface), with light brown tubes. They are characterized by their uneven, ellipsoid spores, and the Polyporus-like skeletal-binding hyphae.

== Taxonomy ==
The genus was circumscribed by Czech mycologists František Kotlaba and Zdenek Pouzar in 1963. The type species, P. tuberculosa, was originally described as Boletus tuberculosus by Augustin Pyramus de Candolle in 1815. Species originally described as a member of Pachykytospora but later transferred to other genera include: Pachykytospora major G.Y.Zheng & Z.S.Bi 1989 (now in Megasporoporia); Pachykytospora nanospora A.David & Rajchenb. 1992, Pachykytospora nepalensis T.Hatt. 2002, and Pachykytospora thindii Natarajan & Koland. 1993 (now Haploporus). Norwegian mycologist and polypore authority Leif Ryvarden suggested that due to its large, grooved spores, Pachykytospora was in a phylogenetically isolated position in the Polyporaceae, although it shows some affinity to the genus Megasporoporia, with which it shares the same hyphal system and type of rot. Unlike Pachykytospora, however, Megasporoporia has smooth spores. In a 2007 publication, Zmitrovich and colleagues suggested that there are nine species in the genus (and they described a tenth, P. wasseri); in 1994, Ryvarden and Robert Lee Gilbertson indicated five species. Yu-Cheng Dai and colleagues treated Pachykytospora as a synonym of Haploporus in a 2002 publication.

== Description ==
The fruit bodies of Pachykytospora species are resupinate-adnate or have stunted, nodule-like caps. The pore surface is white, pallid, brown or has pinkish-violet tinges, while the pores measure 2 to 5 per millimetre. The hyphal system is di- to trimitic: the generative hyphae are hyaline (translucent), thin-walled, and have clamp connections, while the skeletal hyphae are pale yellow, thick-walled, and have a lumen ranging from transparent to nearly solid; the binding hyphae are often indistinct, ranging from hyaline to pale yellow. Depending on the species, cystidia can be either present or absent. The spores are ellipsoid and thick-walled, with indistinct, irregular bumps and low longitudinal ridges; the surface ornamentations become conspicuous after the spores have been stained in methyl blue. Mature spores are sometimes smooth and hyaline.

== Habitat and distribution ==
The type species, P. tuberculosa, is known from Europe, Asia, and North America. In Europe it fruits almost exclusively on oak. P. papyracea is widespread, known in Asia, Africa, Oceania, and North and South America.
