= Vema bacescui =

Scientific classification
- Kingdom: Animalia
- Phylum: Mollusca
- Class: Monoplacophora
- Order: Neopilinida
- Family: Neopilinidae
- Genus: Vema
- Species: V. bacescui

Binomial name
- Vema bacescui Menzies, 1968

Species of monoplacophoran

Vema bacescui is a species of monoplacophoran, a superficially limpet-like marine mollusc.

It is found in the Peru-Chile Trench of the southeastern Pacific Ocean. At 2.8 cm, it is relatively large for a monoplacophoran.
