= Veleropilina veleronis =

Scientific classification
- Domain: Eukaryota
- Kingdom: Animalia
- Phylum: Mollusca
- Class: Monoplacophora
- Order: Neopilinida
- Family: Neopilinidae
- Genus: Veleropilina
- Species: V. veleronis

Binomial name
- Veleropilina veleronis Menzies & Layton, 1963

Species of monoplacophoran

Veleropilina veleronis is a species of monoplacophoran, a superficially limpet-like marine mollusc. It is found off Cedros Island, Mexico in the Pacific Ocean.
