= Veleropilina capulus =

Scientific classification
- Kingdom: Animalia
- Phylum: Mollusca
- Class: Monoplacophora
- Order: Neopilinida
- Family: Neopilinidae
- Genus: Veleropilina
- Species: V. capulus

Binomial name
- Veleropilina capulus (Marshall, 2006)

Synonyms
- Rokopella capulus Marshall, 2006

Species of monoplacophoran

Veleropilina capulus is a species of monoplacophoran, a superficially limpet-like marine mollusc. It was first described by Bruce Marshall in 2006 and originally named Rokopella capulus. It is found in the South Pacific and off the coast of New Zealand.
