= Adenopilina adenensis =

Scientific classification
- Domain: Eukaryota
- Kingdom: Animalia
- Phylum: Mollusca
- Class: Monoplacophora
- Order: Tryblidiida
- Genus: Adenopilina
- Species: A. adenensis

Binomial name
- Adenopilina adenensis Tebble, 1967

Species of monoplacophoran

Adenopilina adenensis is a species of monoplacophoran, a superficially limpet-like marine mollusc. It is known from only one specimen collected from a depth of 3000–4000 metres in the Alula-Fartak Trench of the Gulf of Aden, off the coast of Yemen.
