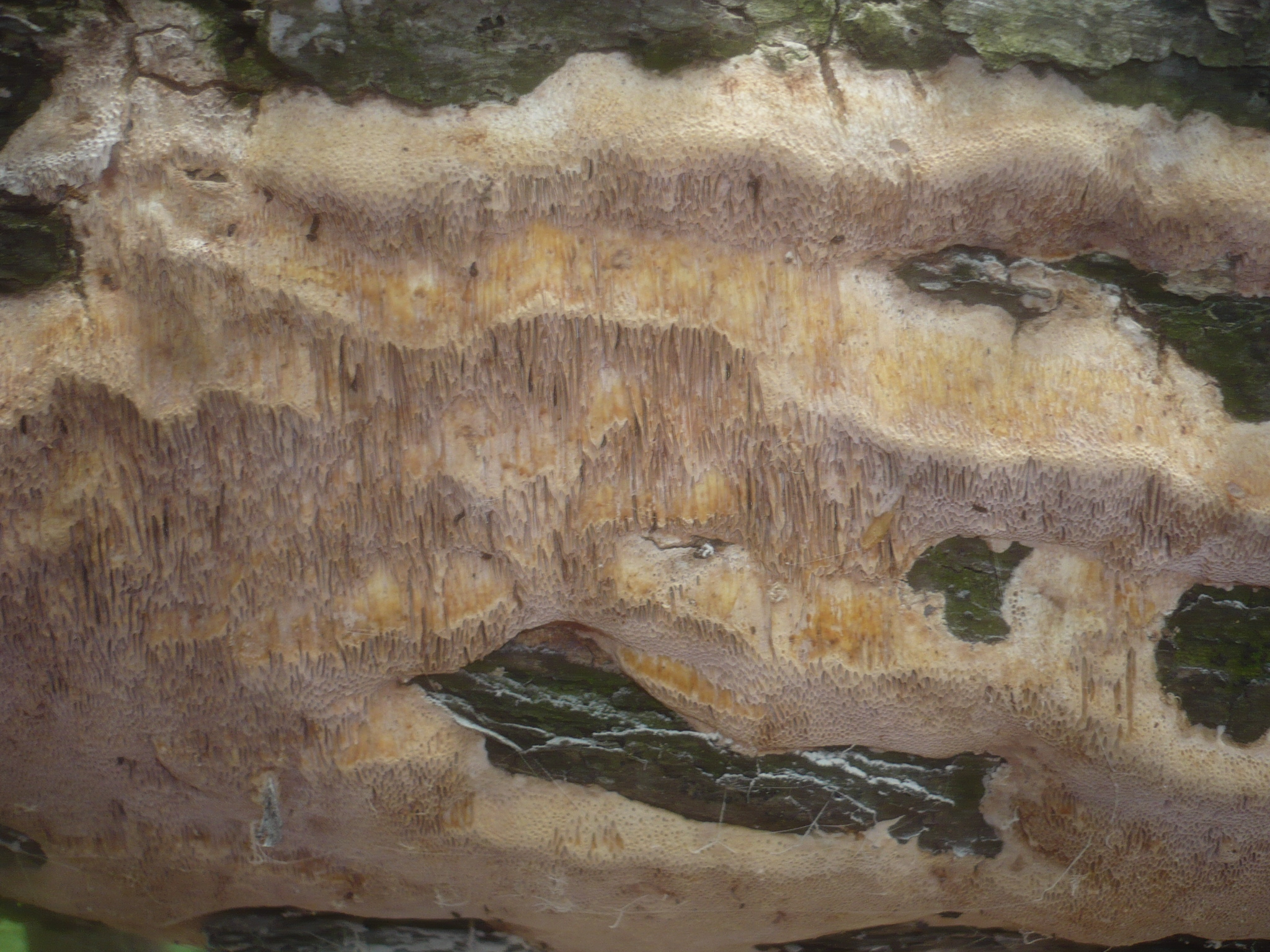
- Pachykytospora tuberculosa, Austria

Scientific classification
- Kingdom: Fungi
- Division: Basidiomycota
- Class: Agaricomycetes
- Order: Polyporales
- Family: Polyporaceae
- Genus: Pachykytospora
- Species: P. tuberculosa

Binomial name
- Pachykytospora tuberculosa (Fr.) Kotl. & Pouzar (1963)

Synonyms
- Polyporus tuberculosus Fr. (1821); Boletus tuberculosus DC. (1815); Polyporus tuberculosus Fr. (1821); Poria subtrametea Pilát (1953); Pachykytospora tuberculosa f. subtrametea (Pilát) Domański (1964); Pachykytospora subtrametea (Pilát) Kotl. & Pouzar (1979); Haploporus subtrameteus (Pilát) Y.C.Dai & Niemelä (2002); Haploporus tuberculosus (Fr.) Niemelä & Y.C.Dai (2002)

= Pachykytospora tuberculosa =

Species of fungus

Pachykytospora tuberculosa is a species of poroid fungus in the family Polyporaceae, and the type species of genus Pachykytospora.

== Taxonomy ==
The genus Pachykytospora was circumscribed by Czech mycologists František Kotlaba and Zdenek Pouzar in 1963 with P. tuberculosa as the type species. This fungus was originally described as Boletus tuberculosus by Augustin Pyramus de Candolle in 1815. Elias Fries later (1821) sanctioned the name as Polyporus tuberculosus.

== Habitat and distribution ==
P. tuberculosa, is known from Europe, Asia, and North America. In Europe it fruits almost exclusively on oak.
