= Mimozotale cylindrica =

Scientific classification
- Kingdom: Animalia
- Phylum: Arthropoda
- Class: Insecta
- Order: Coleoptera
- Suborder: Polyphaga
- Infraorder: Cucujiformia
- Family: Cerambycidae
- Genus: Mimozotale
- Species: M. cylindrica

Binomial name
- Mimozotale cylindrica Hayashi, 1981

Species of beetle

Mimozotale cylindrica is a species of beetle in the family Cerambycidae. It was described by Hayashi in 1981. It is known from Japan.
