= Haploporus thindii =

Scientific classification
- Domain: Eukaryota
- Kingdom: Fungi
- Division: Basidiomycota
- Class: Agaricomycetes
- Order: Polyporales
- Family: Polyporaceae
- Genus: Haploporus
- Species: H. thindii

Binomial name
- Haploporus thindii (Natarajan & Kolandavelu) Y.C.Dai (2005)

Synonyms
- Pachykytospora thindii Natarajan & Kolandavelu (1993)

Species of fungus

Haploporus thindii is a species of poroid crust fungus in the family Polyporaceae. Found in China and India, it causes a white rot in woody substrates.

== Taxonomy ==
The fungus was first described from south India in 1993 as Pachykytospora thindii. In 2002, Yu-Cheng Dai and colleagues treated the genus Pachykytospora as a synonym of Haploporus, and he subsequently transferred this fungus to Haploporus.

== Description ==
Fruit bodies of Haploporus thindii are crust-like, with a dimensions of up to 25 cm (9.8 in) long, 12 cm (4.7 in) wide, and 0.8 mm thick in the central part. The pore surface is coloured cream to pinkish-buff and has a corky texture. There is a distinct margin up to 5 mm wide that surrounds the crust. The angular pores number about three to four per millimetre.

Haploporus thindii has a dimitic hyphal system (containing both generative and skeletal hyphae), and most of the generative hyphae feature clamp connections. The basidia are barrel shaped, with four sterigmata and a clamp at the base. The spores are ellipsoidal and thick-walled, measuring 20–37 by 6.5–9.1 μm.

== Habitat and distribution ==
Haploporus thindii has been reported from South India, and in 2005 was reported in the Xizang Autonomous Region in southwestern China. The Chinese collections were found growing on the decomposing wood of honeysuckles (genus Lonicera) and maple (Acer). It has also been recorded in Taiwan.
