= Megasporoporia bannaensis =

Scientific classification
- Domain: Eukaryota
- Kingdom: Fungi
- Division: Basidiomycota
- Class: Agaricomycetes
- Order: Polyporales
- Family: Polyporaceae
- Genus: Megasporoporia
- Species: M. bannaensis

Binomial name
- Megasporoporia bannaensis B.K.Cui & Hai J.Li (2013)

Species of fungus

Megasporoporia bannaensis is a species of white rot crust fungus in the family Polyporaceae. Found in China, it was described as a new species in 2013 by mycologists Bao-Kai Cui and Hai-Jiao Li. The type was collected in Sanchahe Nature Reserve, Yunnan, where it was found growing on a fallen angiosperm branch. It is characterized by its relatively large pores (numbering 1–2 per millimetre), the unbranched skeletal hyphae, and long, thin hyphal plugs in the hymenium. Its spores measure 10–14 by 3.9–4.6 μm. The specific epithet bannaensis refers to the type locality (Xishuang-Banna).
