= Mimozotale flavovittata =

Scientific classification
- Kingdom: Animalia
- Phylum: Arthropoda
- Class: Insecta
- Order: Coleoptera
- Suborder: Polyphaga
- Infraorder: Cucujiformia
- Family: Cerambycidae
- Genus: Mimozotale
- Species: M. flavovittata

Binomial name
- Mimozotale flavovittata Breuning, 1975

Species of beetle

Mimozotale flavovittata is a species of beetle in the family Cerambycidae. It was described by Stephan von Breuning in 1975. It is known from Myanmar.
