= Minutargyrotoza calvicaput =

Scientific classification
- Domain: Eukaryota
- Kingdom: Animalia
- Phylum: Arthropoda
- Class: Insecta
- Order: Lepidoptera
- Family: Tortricidae
- Genus: Minutargyrotoza
- Species: M. calvicaput

Binomial name
- Minutargyrotoza calvicaput (Walsingham, 1900)

Synonyms
- Epagoge calvicaput Walsingham, 1900

Species of moth

Minutargyrotoza calvicaput is a species of moth of the family Tortricidae. It is found in Japan.

The wingspan is about 13.5 mm.

The larvae have been recorded feeding on Ligustrum tschonoskii.
