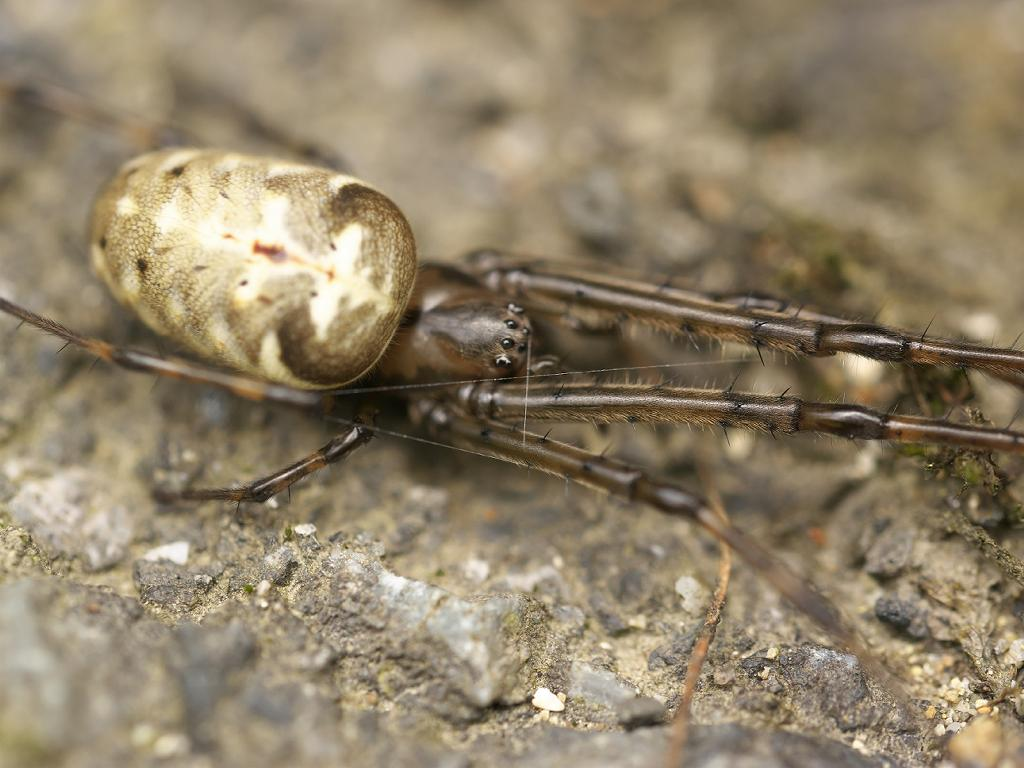
- female from Japan

Scientific classification
- Kingdom: Animalia
- Phylum: Arthropoda
- Subphylum: Chelicerata
- Class: Arachnida
- Order: Araneae
- Infraorder: Araneomorphae
- Family: Tetragnathidae
- Genus: Metleucauge
- Species: M. kompirensis

Binomial name
- Metleucauge kompirensis (Bösenberg & Strand, 1906)

Synonyms
- Meta kompirensis Bösenberg & Strand, 1906; Meta vena Dönitz & Strand, in Bösenberg & Strand, 1906

= Metleucauge kompirensis =

Species of spider

Metleucauge kompirensis is a species of spider in the family Tetragnathidae. It is found across East Asia, including Russia (Far East), China, Korea, Taiwan, and Japan.

== Etymology ==
The specific epithet kompirensis refers to the location "Saga, Kompira" in Japan, near Nagasaki. Bösenberg & Strand (1906) repeatedly mentions this location for specimens collected by Dönitz.

== Taxonomy ==
The species was originally described as Meta kompirensis by Wilhelm Bösenberg and Embrik Strand in 1906. At the same time, the synonym Meta vena was described by Dönitz & Strand. In 1955, Yaginuma synonymized Meta vena with Meta kompirensis. The species was transferred to the genus Metleucauge by Herbert Walter Levi in 1980.

== Distribution ==
M. kompirensis has been recorded from the Russian Far East, various provinces in China (including Hunan, Zhejiang, Fujian, Sichuan, Guizhou, and Yunnan), Korea, Taiwan, and Japan.

== Description ==
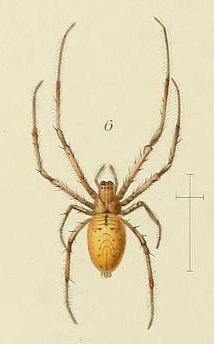
Original drawing from 1906 paper

Females are larger than males, with total body length ranging from 10.7–15.6 mm compared to males at 5.7–7.8 mm. The cephalothorax in females measures 4.2 × 3.4 mm, while in males it is 2.6 × 2.1 mm. The opisthosoma is 6.5 × 4.3 mm in females and 3.1 × 2.0 mm in males.

The species can be distinguished from the closely related Metleucauge yunohamensis by several characteristics: the "V"-shaped marking on the carapace is uniform without light-colored spots, the anterior portion of the abdominal folium is distinct and darker, the middle bulge of the epigyne is sub-spherical, the spermathecae are relatively larger, and in males the tibia is slightly longer than the cymbium, though their length ratio does not exceed 1.5.
