= Mimozotale trivittata =

Scientific classification
- Kingdom: Animalia
- Phylum: Arthropoda
- Class: Insecta
- Order: Coleoptera
- Suborder: Polyphaga
- Infraorder: Cucujiformia
- Family: Cerambycidae
- Genus: Mimozotale
- Species: M. trivittata

Binomial name
- Mimozotale trivittata (Pic, 1931)

Synonyms
- Zotale trivittata Pic, 1931

Species of beetle

Mimozotale trivittata is a species of beetle in the family Cerambycidae. It was described by Pic in 1931. It is known from Vietnam.
