= Megasporoporia minor =

Scientific classification
- Domain: Eukaryota
- Kingdom: Fungi
- Division: Basidiomycota
- Class: Agaricomycetes
- Order: Polyporales
- Family: Polyporaceae
- Genus: Megasporoporia
- Species: M. minor

Binomial name
- Megasporoporia minor B.K.Cui & Hai J.Li (2013)

Species of fungus

Megasporoporia minor is a species of crust fungus in the family Polyporaceae. Found in China, it was described as a new species in 2013 by mycologists Bao-Kai Cui and Hai-Jiao Li. The type was collected was made in Daweishan Forest Park, Yunnan, where it was found growing on a fallen angiosperm branch. It is distinguished from other species of Megasporoporia by its relatively small pores (number 6–7 per millimetre) and small spores (measuring 6–7.8 by 2.6–4 μm); it is these features for which the fungus is named.
