= Megasporia =

Scientific classification
- Kingdom: Fungi
- Division: Basidiomycota
- Class: Agaricomycetes
- Order: Polyporales
- Family: Polyporaceae
- Genus: Megasporia; B.K.Cui, Y.C.Dai & Hai J.Li (2013)

Type species
- Megasporia hexagonoides (Speg.) B.K.Cui, Y.C.Dai & Hai J.Li (2013)

Genus of fungi

Megasporia is a genus of poroid crust fungi in the family Polyporaceae. It was circumscribed in 2013 as a segregate genus of Megasporoporia. Most Megasporia species are found in subtropical and tropical China; the type species, Megasporia hexagonoides, is found in tropical and subtropical America.

== Species ==
- Megasporia cystidiolophora (B.K.Cui & Y.C.Dai) B.K.Cui & Hai J.Li (2013)
- Megasporia ellipsoidea (B.K.Cui & P.Du) B.K.Cui & Hai J.Li (2013)
- Megasporia guangdongensis B.K.Cui & Hai J.Li (2013)
- Megasporia hengduanensis B.K.Cui & Hai J.Li (2013)
- Megasporia hexagonoides (Speg.) B.K.Cui, Y.C.Dai & Hai J.Li (2013)
- Megasporia major (G.Y.Zheng & Z.S.Bi) B.K. Cui, Y.C.Dai & Hai J.Li (2013)
- Megasporia rimosa Y.Yuan, X.H.Ji & Y.C.Dai (2017)
- Megasporia tropica Y.Yuan, X.H.Ji & Y.C.Dai (2017)
- Megasporia violacea (B.K.Cui & P.Du) B.K. Cui, Y.C.Dai & Hai J.Li (2013)
- Megasporia yunnanensis Y.Yuan, X.H.Ji & Y.C.Dai (2017)
