= Mimozotale =

Scientific classification
- Domain: Eukaryota
- Kingdom: Animalia
- Phylum: Arthropoda
- Class: Insecta
- Order: Coleoptera
- Suborder: Polyphaga
- Infraorder: Cucujiformia
- Family: Cerambycidae
- Tribe: Desmiphorini
- Genus: Mimozotale

Genus of beetles

Mimozotale is a genus of longhorn beetles of the subfamily Lamiinae, containing the following species:

subgenus Mimozotale

- Mimozotale flavolineata Breuning, 1951
- Mimozotale javanica Breuning, 1957
- Mimozotale sikkimensis (Breuning, 1940)
- Mimozotale tonkinea Breuning, 1969

subgenus Parazotale

- Mimozotale cylindrica Hayashi, 1981
- Mimozotale longipennis (Pic, 1927)
- Mimozotale minuta (Pic, 1926)

subgenus Trizotale

- Mimozotale flavovittata Breuning, 1975
- Mimozotale trivittata (Pic, 1931)
