= Haploporus latisporus =

Scientific classification
- Domain: Eukaryota
- Kingdom: Fungi
- Division: Basidiomycota
- Class: Agaricomycetes
- Order: Polyporales
- Family: Polyporaceae
- Genus: Haploporus
- Species: H. latisporus

Binomial name
- Haploporus latisporus Juan Li & Y.C.Dai (2007)

Species of fungus

Haploporus latisporus is a species of poroid white rot crust fungus in the family Polyporaceae. It is found in Central China, where it grows on decomposing pine twigs.

== Taxonomy ==
The type collection of Haploporus latisporus was made in Jigongshan (Henan Province) in August 2005, and described as a new species in 2007. The specific epithet latisporus refers to its wide spores, which, at up to 10 μm, are the broadest in genus Haploporus.

== Description ==
Fruit bodies of Haploporus septatus occur in small crust-like patches that are difficult to separate from the underlying substrate. Individually, they measure up to 2 cm (0.8 in) long and 1.5 cm (0.6 in) wide, and up to 1 mm thick at the centre. The hymenophore, or pore surface, is white to cream coloured, darkening slightly in dry conditions. The round to angular pores number around two to three per millimetre.

The hyphal structure is dimitic to trimitic. The generative hyphae have clamp connections. The thick-walled, cylindrical spores are ornamented with warts (up to 2 μm long) and typically measure 13–16.5 by 8–10 μm.
