= Mimozotale sikkimensis =

Scientific classification
- Kingdom: Animalia
- Phylum: Arthropoda
- Class: Insecta
- Order: Coleoptera
- Suborder: Polyphaga
- Infraorder: Cucujiformia
- Family: Cerambycidae
- Genus: Mimozotale
- Species: M. sikkimensis

Binomial name
- Mimozotale sikkimensis (Breuning, 1940)

Species of beetle

Mimozotale sikkimensis is a species of beetle in the family Cerambycidae. It was described by Stephan von Breuning in 1940. It is known from India.
