= Mimozotale javanica =

Scientific classification
- Kingdom: Animalia
- Phylum: Arthropoda
- Clade: Pancrustacea
- Class: Insecta
- Order: Coleoptera
- Suborder: Polyphaga
- Infraorder: Cucujiformia
- Family: Cerambycidae
- Genus: Mimozotale
- Species: M. javanica

Binomial name
- Mimozotale javanica Breuning, 1957

Species of beetle

Mimozotale javanica is a species of beetle in the family Cerambycidae. It was described by Stephan von Breuning in 1957. It is known from Java.
