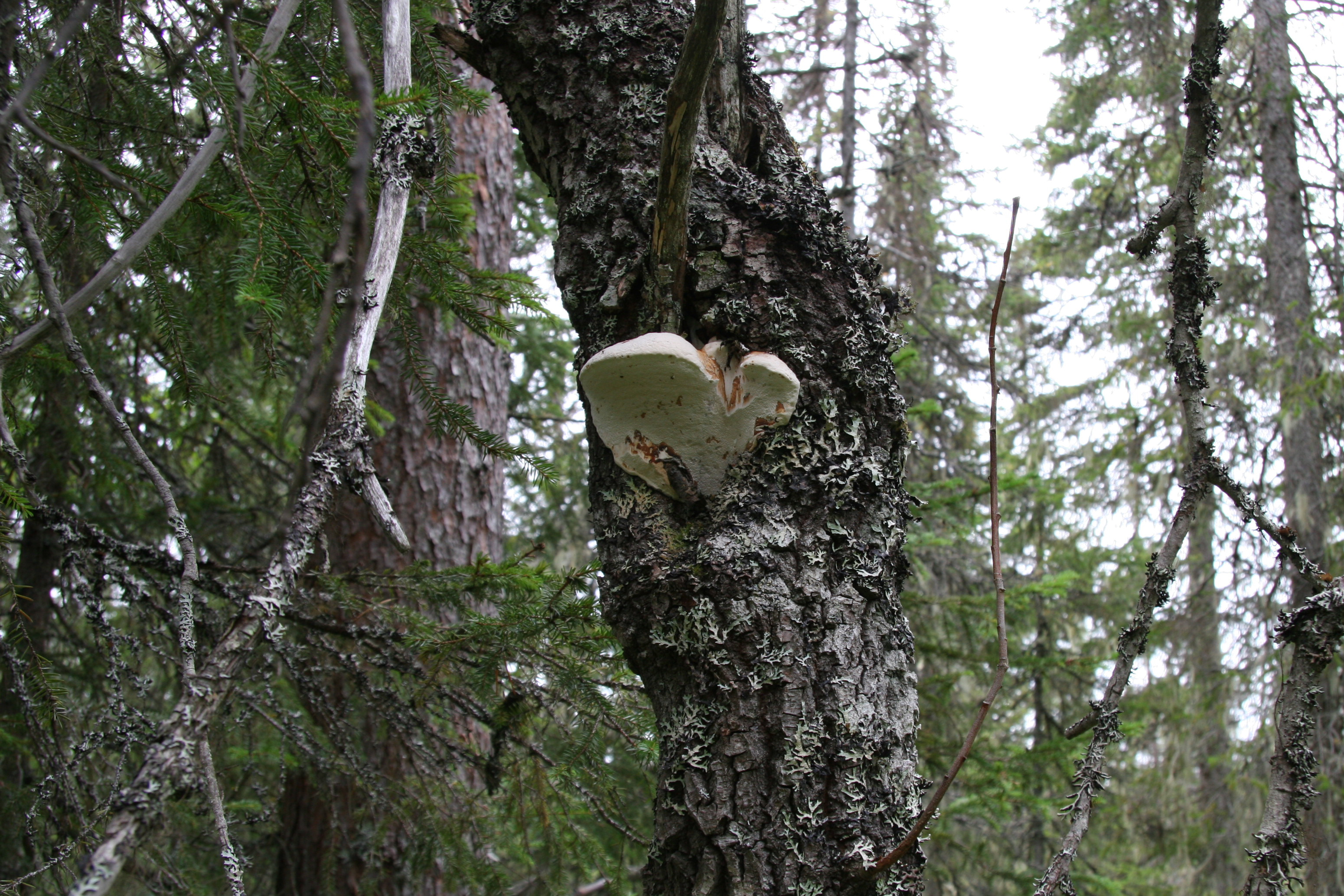
- Haploporus odorus

Scientific classification
- Kingdom: Fungi
- Division: Basidiomycota
- Class: Agaricomycetes
- Order: Polyporales
- Family: Polyporaceae
- Genus: Haploporus; Bondartsev & Singer (1944)

Type species
- Haploporus odorus (Sommerf.) Bondartsev & Singer (1944)

Synonyms
- Haploporus Bondartsev & Singer (1941); Haploporus Bondartsev (1953)

= Haploporus (fungus) =

Genus of fungi

Haploporus is a genus of poroid fungi in the family Polyporaceae.

== Taxonomy ==
The genus Haploporus was circumscribed by mycologists Appollinaris Semenovich Bondartsev and Rolf Singer in 1944 with Haploporus odorus as the type, and only species. The name Haploporus is derived from the Greek words απλόος ("simple"), and πόρος ("pore").

Yu-Cheng Dai and colleagues treated the genus Pachykytospora as a synonym of Haploporus in 2002, and then in subsequent publications. Marcin Piątek proposed dividing Haploporus into two sections: sect. Haploporus (cap-like fruit bodies), and sect. Pachykytospora (crust-like fruit bodies). Leif Ryvarden, who adopts a "pragmatic and conservative generic concept" in his 2014 work on European polypores, treats Haploporus as monotypic, containing only H. odorus.

Using Haploporus tuberculosis as a representative generic exemplar, molecular analysis showed Haploporus to be nested within the core polyporoid clade, a phylogenetic grouping of fungi roughly equivalent to the family Polyporaceae.

== Description ==
Haploporus species have an annual to perennial growth habit. They are crust like, with sessile or effused-reflexed (crust like with outside edges extended to form caps) fruit bodies. The hyphal system of Haploporus is dimitic to trimitic; the generative hyphae have clamp connections. The spores are oblong ellipsoid to roughly spherical, ornamented, thick-walled and cyanophilous.

== Habitat and distribution ==
Haploporus fungi cause a white rot.

== Species ==
As of January 2018, Index Fungorum accepts 6 species of Haploporus, retaining Pachykytospora as an independent genus. In a 2016 taxonomic and phylogenetic study of the genus, Chinese scientists accept 13 species, including three newly described species from China.

- Haploporus alabamae (Berk. & Cooke) Y.C.Dai & Niemelä (2002)
- Haploporus amarus X.L.Zeng & Y.P.Bai (1993) – China
- Haploporus angustisporus Meng Zhou & Y.C. Dai (2019) – China
- Haploporus crassus Meng Zhou & Y.C. Dai (2019) – China
- Haploporus cylindrosporus L.L.Shen, Y.C.Dai & B.K.Cui (2016) – China
- Haploporus gilbertsonii Meng Zhou & Y.C. Dai (2019) – U.S.
- Haploporus latisporus Juan Li & Y.C.Dai (2007) – China
- Haploporus microsporus Meng Zhou & Y.C. Dai (2019) – China
- Haploporus nanosporus (A.David & Rajchenb.) Piątek (2005)
- Haploporus nepalensis (T.Hatt.) Piątek (2003) – Europe
- Haploporus odorus (Sommerf.) Bondartsev & Singer (1944)
- Haploporus papyraceus (Cooke) Y.C.Dai & Niemelä (2002)
- Haploporus pirongia (G.Cunn.) Meng Zhou, Y.C.Dai & T.W.May (2019) – Australia & N.Z.
- Haploporus septatus L.L.Shen, Y.C.Dai & B.K.Cui (2016) – China
- Haploporus subpapyraceus L.L.Shen, Y.C.Dai & B.K.Cui (2016) – China
- Haploporus subtrameteus (Pilát) Y.C.Dai & Niemelä (2002)
- Haploporus thindii (Natarajan & Koland.) Y.C.Dai (2005) – China; India
- Haploporus tuberculosis (Fr.) Niemelä & Y.C.Dai (2002)
