= Monoplacophorus zenkevitchi =

Scientific classification
- Domain: Eukaryota
- Kingdom: Animalia
- Phylum: Mollusca
- Class: Monoplacophora
- Order: Tryblidiida
- Genus: Monoplacophorus
- Species: M. zenkevitchi

Binomial name
- Monoplacophorus zenkevitchi Moskalev, Starobogatov & Filatova, 1983

Species of monoplacophoran

Monoplacophorus zenkevitchi is a species of monoplacophoran, a superficially limpet-like marine mollusc. It is known from only one specimen collected from a depth of 2000 metres in the Pacific Ocean, north of Johnston Island and west of Hawaii.
