= Gastric shield =

A gastric shield is an organ in the digestive tract of bivalves, tusk shells, and some gastropods against which a crystalline style typically rotates, in an action resembling that of a mortar and pestle. The gastric shield is permeated by microcanals which transmit digestive enzymes from the stomach, and serves to protect the cells of the stomach lining from the abrasive effects of the style.
