= Laevipilina =

Scientific classification
- Domain: Eukaryota
- Kingdom: Animalia
- Phylum: Mollusca
- Class: Monoplacophora
- Order: Neopilinida
- Family: Neopilinidae
- Genus: Laevipilina; McLean, 1979

Species
- Laevipilina antarctica; Laevipilina cachuchensis; Laevipilina hyalina; Laevipilina rolani; Laevipilina theresae

Genus of monoplacophorans

Laevipilina is a genus of monoplacophoran molluscs. They are very small, mostly deepwater animals which have a superficially limpet-like shell. All species are at approximately 2–3 mm in length, have 5 pairs of gills (except for Laevipilina hyalina, which has 6 pairs), and have 4–5 intestinal coils.

== Species ==
There are five species:

- Laevipilina antarctica Warén & Hain, 1992
- Laevipilina cachuchensis Urgorri, García-Álvarez & Luque, 2005
- Laevipilina hyalina (McLean, 1979)
- Laevipilina rolani Warén & Bouchet, 1990
- Laevipilina theresae Schrödl, 2006
