= Haploporus cylindrosporus =

Scientific classification
- Domain: Eukaryota
- Kingdom: Fungi
- Division: Basidiomycota
- Class: Agaricomycetes
- Order: Polyporales
- Family: Polyporaceae
- Genus: Haploporus
- Species: H. cylindrosporus

Binomial name
- Haploporus cylindrosporus L.L.Shen, Y.C.Dai & B.K.Cui (2016)

Species of fungus

Haploporus cylindrosporus is a species of poroid crust fungus in the family Polyporaceae. Found in China, it causes a white rot in decomposing angiosperm wood.

== Taxonomy ==
The fungus was collected from Ailaoshan Nature Reserve in Jingdong County (Yunnan Province) in August 2015, and described as a new species the following year. The specific epithet cylindrosporus refers to the cylindrical spores.

== Description ==
Fruit bodies of Haploporus cylindrosporus are crust-like, measuring 5–8.5 cm (2.0–3.3 in) long, 2–2.5 cm (0.8–1.0 in) wide, and up to 2 mm thick at the centre. The hymenophore, or pore surface, is white to cream coloured. The pores number around four to five per millimetre. There is a distinct margin that surrounds the fruit body, which is up to 2.5 mm wide.

The hyphal structure is dimitic, meaning that there are both generative and skeletal hyphae. The generative hyphae have clamp connections. The thick-walled, cylindrical spores typically measure 10–11.5 by 4.5–5 μm.
