= Haploporus septatus =

Scientific classification
- Domain: Eukaryota
- Kingdom: Fungi
- Division: Basidiomycota
- Class: Agaricomycetes
- Order: Polyporales
- Family: Polyporaceae
- Genus: Haploporus
- Species: H. septatus

Binomial name
- Haploporus septatus L.L.Shen, Y.C.Dai & B.K.Cui (2016)

Species of fungus

Haploporus septatus is a species of poroid crust fungus in the family Polyporaceae. Found in China, it causes a white rot in decomposing angiosperm wood.

== Taxonomy ==
The fungus was collected from Ailaoshan Nature Reserve in Jingdong County (Yunnan Province) in October 2013, and described as a new species three years later. The specific epithet septatus refers to the septate skeletal hyphae.

== Description ==
Fruit bodies of Haploporus septatus are crust-like, measuring 4–5.5 cm (1.6–2.2 in) long, 1–2.5 cm (0.4–1.0 in) wide, and up to 8 mm thick at the centre. The hymenophore, or pore surface, is white to cream coloured. The pores number around five to six per millimetre. The context has no distinct odour or taste.

The hyphal structure is dimitic, meaning that there are both generative and skeletal hyphae. The generative hyphae have clamp connections. The thick-walled, cylindrical spores typically measure 8.5–11 by 5–6 μm.
