= Megasporoporiella =

Scientific classification
- Kingdom: Fungi
- Division: Basidiomycota
- Class: Agaricomycetes
- Order: Polyporales
- Family: Polyporaceae
- Genus: Megasporoporiella; B.K.Cui, Y.C.Dai & Hai J.Li (2013)

Type species
- Megasporoporiella cavernulosa (Berk.) B.K.Cui, Y.C.Dai & Hai J.Li (2013)

Genus of fungi

Megasporoporiella is a genus of five species of white rot poroid crust fungi in the family Polyporaceae. It was circumscribed in 2013 as a segregate genus of Megasporoporia. Characteristics of the genus include a dimitic hyphal structure, and skeletal hyphae that are weakly to moderately dextrinoid. Megasporoporiella has a primarily temperate distribution. The generic name refers to its similarity to Megasporoporia.

== Species ==
- Megasporoporiella cavernulosa (Berk.) B.K.Cui, Y.C.Dai & Hai J. Li (2013)
- Megasporoporiella lacerata B.K.Cui & Hai J.Li (2013)
- Megasporoporiella pseudocavernulosa B.K.Cui & Hai J.Li (2013)
- Megasporoporiella rhododendri (Y.C.Dai & Y.L.Wei) B.K. Cui & Hai J.Li (2013)
- Megasporoporiella subcavernulosa (Y.C.Dai & Sheng H.Wu) B.K. Cui & Hai J.Li (2013)
