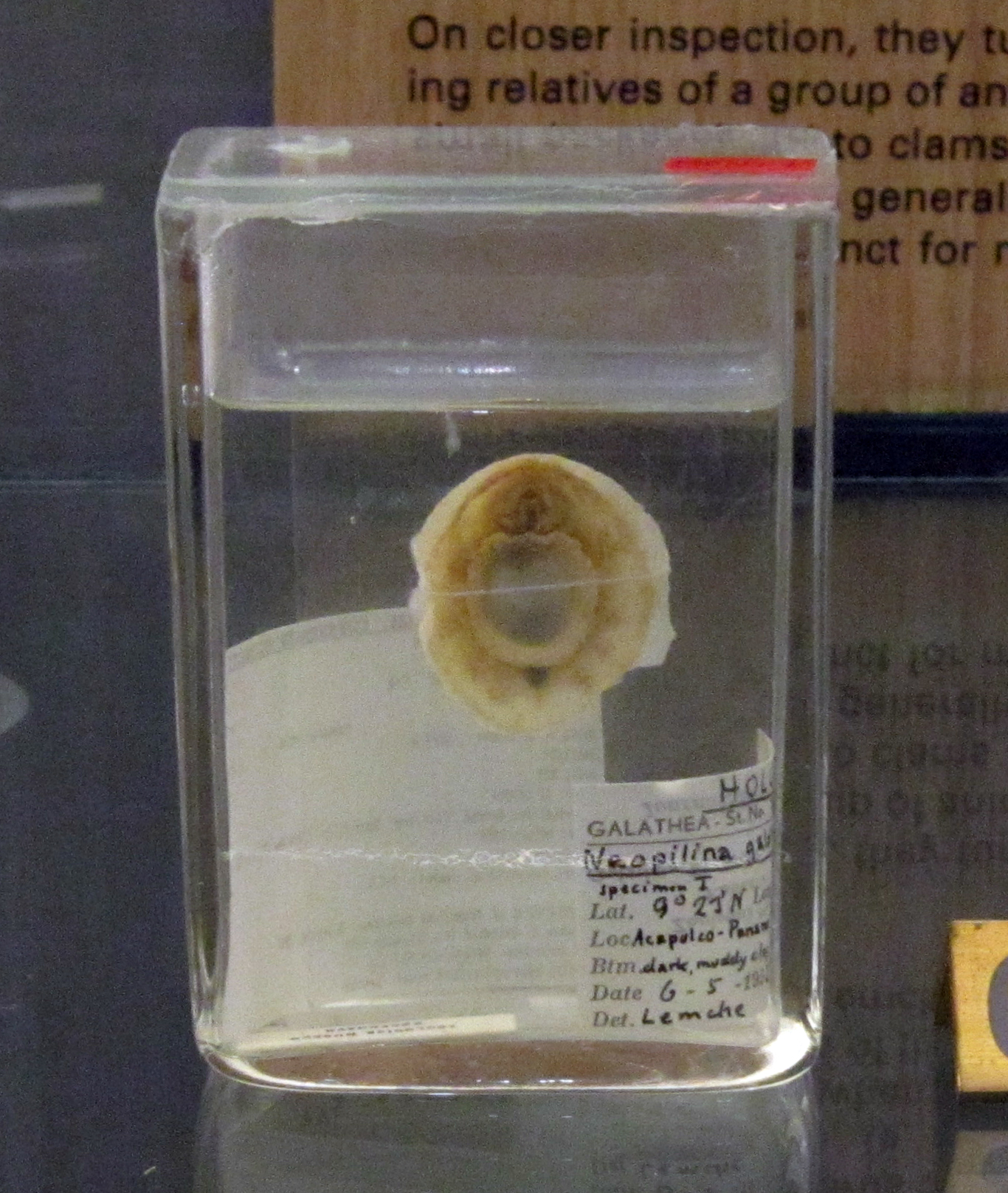
- The holotype of Neopilina galatheae at the Zoological Museum, Copenhagen

Scientific classification
- Domain: Eukaryota
- Kingdom: Animalia
- Phylum: Mollusca
- Class: Monoplacophora
- Subclass: Tergomya
- Order: Tryblidiida; Lemche, 1957

Families
- Laevipilinidae; Micropilinidae; Monoplacophoridae; Neopilinidae; †Tryblidiidae

= Tryblidiida =

Tryblidiida Temporal range: Middle Pleistocene– Recent

Order of molluscs

Tryblidiida is a taxon of monoplacophoran molluscans containing the only extant representatives: 37 species are still alive today, inhabiting the ocean at depths of between 175 and 6,400 metres (574 and 21,000 ft).

== History of discoveries ==
The first captured living monoplacophoran was Veleropilina zografi in 1896, but at that time it was described as if it were an archaeogastropod, a true limpet, mainly because of its patelliform (limpet-like) shell. This species was finally revealed to be monoplacophoran 87 years later, in 1983.

In April 1952, a living specimen was collected from deep depths in the Middle America Trench off Costa Rica's Pacific coast. In 1957 that species was described and named Neopilina galatheae by its discoverer, Danish biologist Henning Mourier Lemche (1904–1977). An expert in the field has called this discovery "one of the greatest sensations in the [twentieth] century." As of 2008, there were 31 living species known, discovered in waters from 200 meters in depth to hadal depths, or more than 6,000 meters in the deepest ocean trenches.

The first specimen photographed alive was Vema hyalina, at a depth of 400 meters off Catalina Island, California, in 1977. Scientists believe that the taxon Monoplacophora is probably polyphyletic and have proposed including all the living members in the order Tryblidiida.

In 1989, fossils in Italy from the middle Pleistocene were described which appear to be identical with the living species Micropilina minuta.

== Anatomy ==
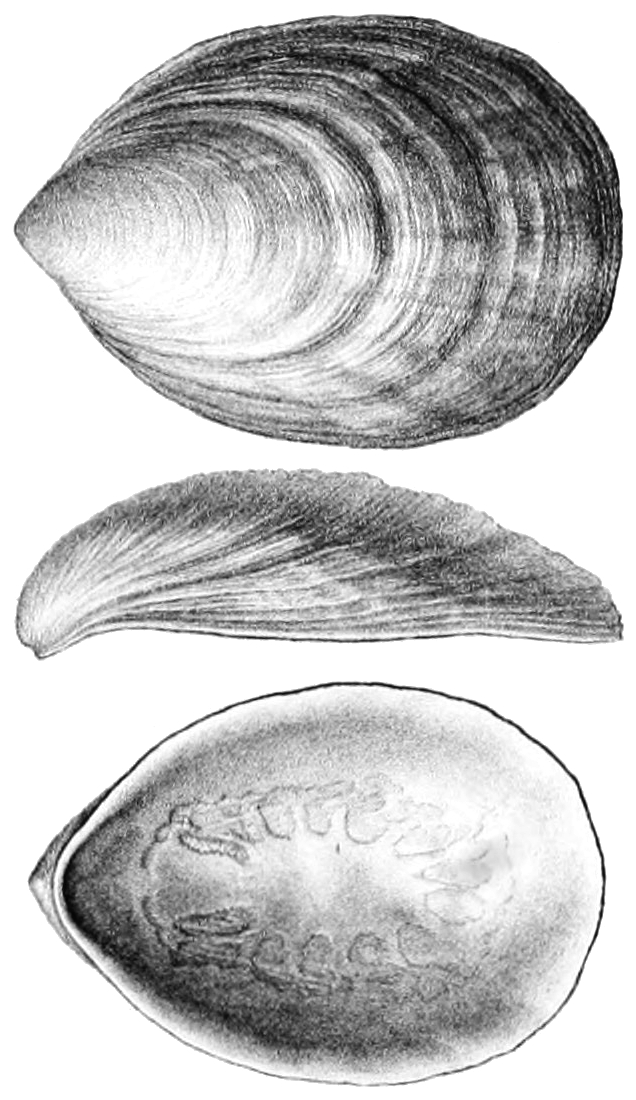
Drawing of the shell of Pilina unguis. Head region is on the left.

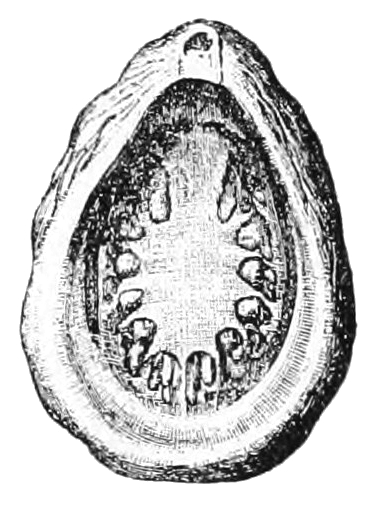
Ventral view of the (fossil) shell of Tryblidium reticulatum Lindström, 1880. There are visible muscular attachment scars. Head region is on the upper part of the drawing. The shell length is up to 43 mm.

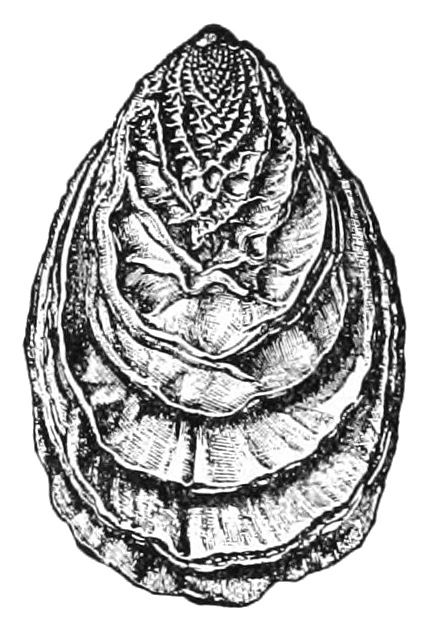
Dorsal view of the shell of Tryblidium reticulatum.

Little is known about monoplacophorans. They have a single, flat, rounded bilateral shell that is often thin and fragile; it ranges in size from 3 to 30 millimetres (in recent species). The apex of the shell is at the anterior end. The fossil shells exhibit a series of muscular attachment scars on the inner side, suggesting metamerism; indeed, with living Monoplacophora to study, it can be seen that their body segments exhibit a serial repetition of kidneys, gills and reproductive structure. This used to be interpreted as a true segmentation, which suggested a "missing link" between mollusks and annelids. More recent studies have shown that the repetition of these organs is secondary.

Monoplacophorans move on a rounded foot. Their reduced head lacks eyes or tentacles.

The mantle cavity forms a horseshoe-shaped groove running around the muscular foot, in a similar fashion to that of the chitons, and contains five or six gills on either side. The mouth opens on the underside between the ends of the groove, while the anus opens into the hindmost part. Like chitons, monoplacophorans possess a sensory subradular organ, as well as a rasping radula. A fold of ciliated tissue surrounds the mouth to the front and sides, while a smaller fold, bearing a number of tentacles, lies just behind it. The stomach contains a style, projecting from a diverticulum, or "style sac".

The mouth has a chevron-shaped lip in front of it, and bears tentacles behind it, which have various shapes and layouts in different species.

The heart is divided into two equal halves, each with its own auricle, ventricle and aorta. The left and right aorta fuse shortly after leaving the heart, and supply blood to the open circulatory system. There are six pairs of nephridial excretory organs, which empty into the mantle cavity.

The nervous system has small ganglia around the oesophagus from which two pairs of main nerve cords run through the body; one pair supplying the foot, and the other the visceral organs. As in the chitons, these main nerve cords are connected by a series of lateral nerves, giving the layout of the nervous system an appearance somewhat like a ladder.

There are two pairs of gonads, which release gametes into the water through one of the pairs of nephridia. The sexes are separate, and fertilisation is external.

== Ecology ==
=== Habitat ===
Monoplacophora are a geographically widespread component of the benthos. Most are known from deep water (1800 – 6500 meters), although several species are found in shallower waters ranging up to 200 meters.

=== Feeding habits ===
It is presumed that they graze on microscopic organisms in mud or bottom detritus.

== Taxonomy of extant species ==
Order Tryblidiida

- Family Laevipilinidae
  - Genus Laevipilina J. H. McLean, 1979
    - Laevipilina antarctica Warén & Hain, 1992
    - Laevipilina cachuchensis Urgorri, García-Alvarez & Luque, 2005
    - Laevipilina hyalina J. H. McLean, 1979
    - Laevipilina rolani Warén & Bouchet, 1990
    - Laevipilina theresae Schrödl, 2006
- Family Micropilinidae
  - Genus Micropilina Warén, 1989
    - Micropilina arntzi Warén & Hain, 1992
    - Micropilina minuta Warén, 1989
    - Micropilina rakiura Marshall, 1998
    - Micropilina reingi Marshall, 2006
    - Micropilina tangaroa Marshall, 1992
    - Micropilina wareni Marshall, 2006
- Family Monoplacophoridae
  - Genus Monoplacophorus Moskalev, Starobogatov & Filatova, 1983
    - Monoplacophorus zenkevitchi Moskalev, Starobogatov & Filatova, 1983
- Family Neopilinidae
  - Genus Adenopilina Starobogatov & Moskalev, 1987
    - Adenopilina adenensis (Tebble, 1967)
  - Genus Neopilina H. Lemche, 1957
    - Neopilina bruuni Menzies, 1968
    - Neopilina galatheae Lemche, 1957
    - Neopilina rebainsi Moskalev, Starobogatov & Filatova, 1983
    - Neopilina starobogatovi Ivanov & Moskalev, 2007
  - Genus Rokopella Starobogatov & Moskalev, 1987
    - Rokopella brummeri Goud & Gittenberger, 1993
    - Rokopella capulus Marshall, 2006
    - Rokopella euglypta (Dautzenberg & Fischer, 1897)
    - Rokopella goesi (Warén, 1988)
    - Rokopella oligotropha (Rokop, 1972)
    - Rokopella segonzaci Warén & Bouchet, 2001
  - Genus Veleropilina Starobogatov & Moskalev, 1987
    - Veleropilina brummeri (Goud & Gittenberger, 1993)
    - Veleropilina capulus (B. A. Marshall, 2006)
    - Veleropilina euglypta (Dautzenberg & H. Fischer, 1897)
    - Veleropilina goesi (Warén, 1988)
    - Veleropilina oligotropha (Rokop, 1972)
    - Veleropilina reticulata (Seguenza, 1876)
    - Veleropilina segonzaci (Warén & Bouchet, 2001)
    - Veleropilina seisuimaruae Kano, S. Kimura, T. Kimura & Warén, 2012
    - Veleropilina veleronis (Menzies & Layton, 1963)
    - Veleropilina zografi (Dautzenberg & H. Fischer, 1896)
  - Genus Vema (Clarke & Menzies, 1959)
    - Vema bacescui (Menzies, 1968)
    - Vema ewingi (Clarke & Menzies, 1959)
    - Vema levinae Warén, 1996
    - Vema occidua B. A. Marshall, 2006
