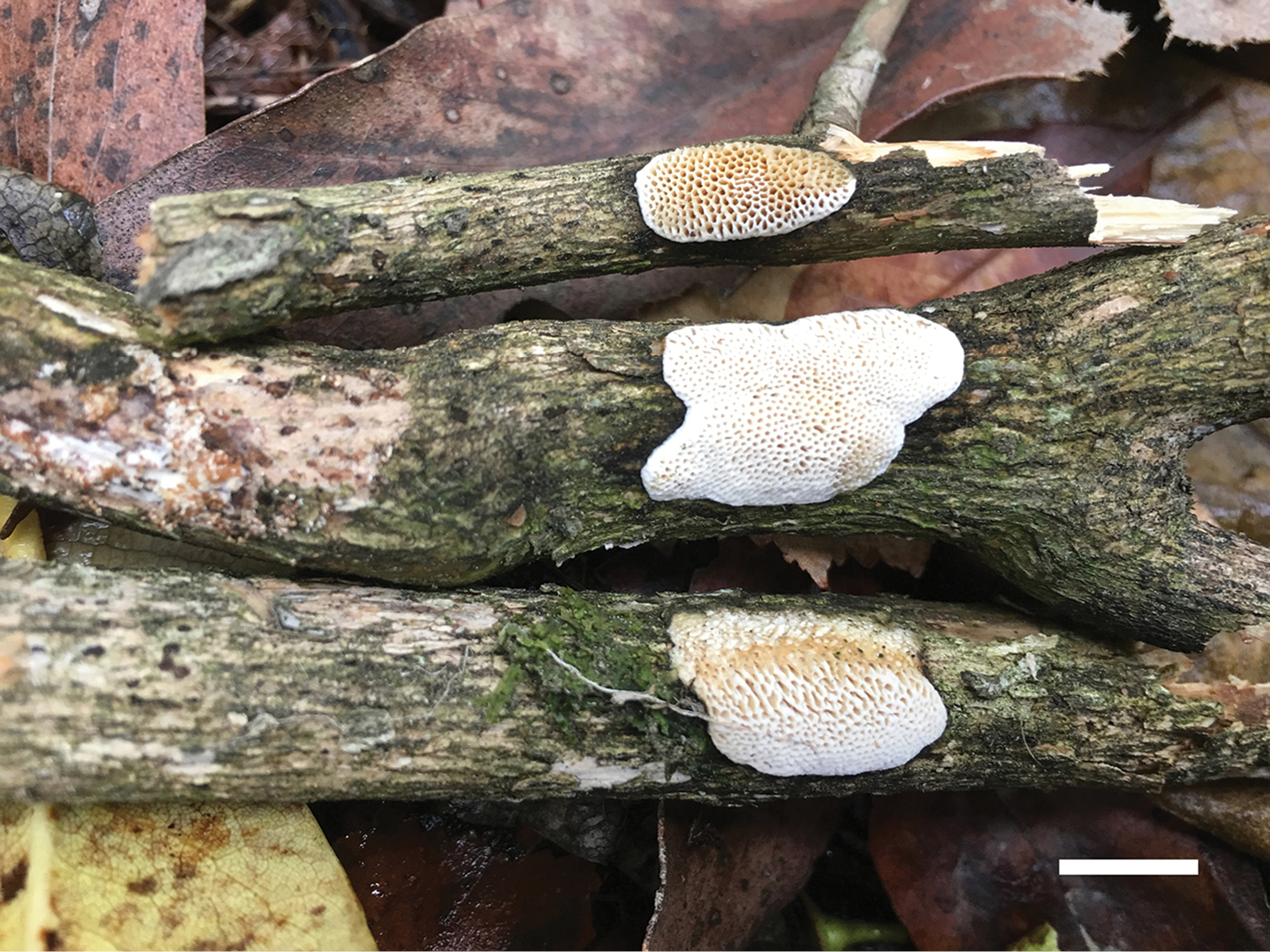
- Scale bar: 1 cm

Scientific classification
- Kingdom: Fungi
- Division: Basidiomycota
- Class: Agaricomycetes
- Order: Polyporales
- Family: Polyporaceae
- Genus: Haploporus
- Species: H. pirongia

Binomial name
- Haploporus pirongia (G.Cunn.) Meng Zhou, Y.C.Dai & T.W.May (2019)

Synonyms
- Poria pirongia G.Cunn. (1947)

= Haploporus pirongia =

Species of lichen

Haploporus pirongia is a species of fungus in the family Polyporaceae. This polypore occurs on trees in New Zealand and Australia.

== Taxonomy ==
The fungus was first formally described in 1947 by the mycologist Gordon Heriot Cunningham, who initially classified it in the genus Poria. The taxon was transferred to the genus Haploporus in 2019, after molecular phylogenetics analyses. In this analysis, it appeared in a clade with a sister relationship with Haploporus odorus.

The species epithet pirongia is derived from the type locality, Mount Pirongia (on New Zealand's North Island). It is treated as a noun in apposition, meaning it remains unchanged in spelling when transferred from the genus Poria to Haploporus, even though Haploporus is masculine in gender.

== Description ==
Haploporus pirongia is an annual, resupinate fungus with a fruitbody that adheres closely to its substrate. When fresh, it is soft and corky, turning fully corky upon drying, and lacks any distinctive odour or taste. The fruitbody can reach up to 8 cm in length, 2 cm in width, and 1.7 mm in thickness at its centre. The pore surface is white to cream when fresh, becoming pale brownish when bruised, and changes to pinkish buff to clay-buff upon drying. It has a very narrow or almost absent sterile margin, with round to angular pores at a density of 3–4 per mm, and thick, entire dissepiments (thin, partition-like structures that separates the pores). The subiculum (a layer of fungal tissue found beneath the spore-bearing surface) is cream-coloured, corky, and about 0.3 mm thick, while the tubes are light buff, corky, and approximately 1.4 mm long.

The hyphal structure is trimitic, consisting of three types of hyphae: generative, skeletal, and binding. Generative hyphae are hyaline (translucent), thin-walled, and frequently branched, bearing clamp connections. Skeletal hyphae are dominant, thick-walled to somewhat solid, hyaline to slightly yellowish, and frequently branched. Binding hyphae are abundant, and slightly thick-walled.

In the subiculum, generative hyphae measure 2.3–3.5 μm in diameter, skeletal hyphae are 2.5–4 μm, and binding hyphae are 1–2 μm. In the tubes, generative hyphae are 1.7–3.5 μm in diameter, skeletal hyphae are 2.5–4 μm, and binding hyphae are 1–2.5 μm. Cystidia are absent, but cystidioles are present, fusiform (spindle shaped), and occasionally have an apical simple septum. Basidioles are similar in shape to basidia but slightly smaller, while basidia are pear-shaped to barrel-shaped, with four sterigmata and a basal clamp connection, measuring 21–35 by 8–11 μm. Hyphae at the dissepiments are usually thick-walled with simple septa. Dendrohyphidia are absent, and some irregularly shaped crystals are present among tube tramal structures.

The basidiospores are oblong-ellipsoid to cylindrical, hyaline, thick-walled with tuberculate ornamentations, some containing a fat droplet (guttule). They typically measure 11–14 by 5.2–7 μm, with an average length of 12.35 μm and width of 6.11 μm.
