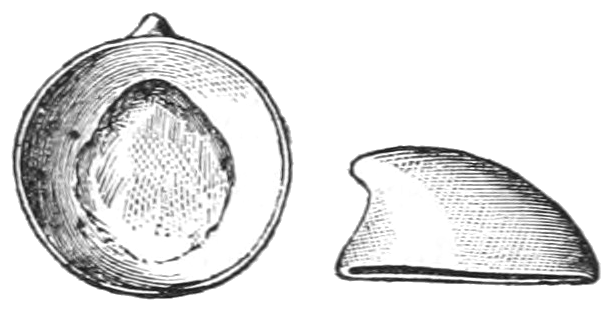
- drawing of Archinacella instabilis from family Archinacellidae

Scientific classification
- Kingdom: Animalia
- Phylum: Mollusca
- Class: Gastropoda
- Subclass: incertae sedis
- Superfamily: †Archinacelloidea; Knight, 1952

= Archinacelloidea =

Archinacelloidea Temporal range: Middle Ordovician–Late Ordovician

Extinct superfamily of molluscs

Archinacelloidea is an extinct superfamily of paleozoic molluscs of uncertain position (Gastropoda or Monoplacophora).

== Families ==
- † Archinacellidae
- † Archaeopragidae
- † Pollicinidae Perner, 1925
