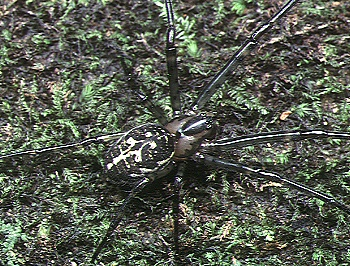
- Metleucauge chikunii female

Scientific classification
- Kingdom: Animalia
- Phylum: Arthropoda
- Subphylum: Chelicerata
- Class: Arachnida
- Order: Araneae
- Infraorder: Araneomorphae
- Family: Tetragnathidae
- Genus: Metleucauge; Levi, 1980

Type species
- M. eldorado Levi, 1980

Species
- 8, see text

= Metleucauge =

Genus of spiders

Metleucauge is a genus of long-jawed orb-weavers that was first described by Herbert Walter Levi in 1980.

== Species ==
As of October 2019 it contains eight species, found in Asia and the United States:

- Metleucauge chikunii Tanikawa, 1992 – China, Korea, Taiwan, Japan
- Metleucauge davidi (Schenkel, 1963) – China, Taiwan
- Metleucauge dentipalpis (Kroneberg, 1875) – Central Asia
- Metleucauge eldorado Levi, 1980 (type) – USA
- Metleucauge kompirensis (Bösenberg & Strand, 1906) – Russia (Far East), China, Korea, Taiwan, Japan
- Metleucauge minuta Yin, 2012 – China
- Metleucauge yaginumai Tanikawa, 1992 – Japan
- Metleucauge yunohamensis (Bösenberg & Strand, 1906) – Russia (Far East), China, Korea, Taiwan, Japan

In synonymy:

- M. sinensis (Schenkel, 1953) = Metleucauge yunohamensis (Bösenberg & Strand, 1906)
- M. vena (Dönitz & Strand, 1906) = Metleucauge kompirensis (Bösenberg & Strand, 1906)
