= Kirengellida =

Kirengellida Temporal range: Late Cambrian–Mid Ordovician

Scientific classification
- Kingdom: Animalia
- Phylum: Mollusca
- Class: Monoplacophora
- Subclass: Tergomya
- Order: †Kirengellida; Rozov, 1975

Superfamilies
- Hypseloconoidea; Kirengelloidea

Synonyms
- Romaniellida

Extinct family of shelled animals

The Kirengellids are a group of problematic Cambrian fossil shells of marine organisms. The shells bear a number of paired muscle scars on the inner surface of the valve.

These fossils have conventionally been regarded as monoplacophoran molluscs, and possibly ancestral to gastropods or cephalopods. They were presumed to be exogastric on the presumption that their larger muscle scars were anterior, but it may be dangerous to compare these scars with molluscan musculature. In any case, they coiled in the opposite direction to Romaniella. However, their calcitic shells, the position of the muscle scars, and putative association with secondary shell elements, make a brachiopod affinity possible, by analogy with the mobergellans: a group of phosphatic shells from the same time period, with a similar set of muscle scars. There is also strong similarity to the contemporary brachiopod group, the Craniopsids. In the case of this diagnosis, a simple lophophore apparatus is postulated to sit between the muscle scars and the edges of the shell. On the other hand, Vendrasco (2012) reaffirmed the interpretation of the kirengellids as molluscs, noting that the Kirengella muscle scar pattern is also similar to what occurs in monoplacophorans. Bouchet et al. (2017) classified Kirengellida as an order within the subclass Tergomya.

== Included taxa ==
After

- Kirengella Rozov, 1968 (Upper Cambrian)
  - † Kirengella alta Whitfield 1889
  - Kirengella ayaktchica - type species
  - Kirengella expansus
  - † Kirengella kultavasaensis Doguzhaeva 1972
  - Kirengella oregonensis
  - Kirengella pyramidalis
  - † Kirengella rectilateralis Berkey 1898
  - † Kirengella stabilis Berkey 1898
  - Kirengella washingtonense
- Hypseloconus (Upper Cambrian)
- Lenaella (Tremadoc / Lower Ordovician)
- Nyuella (Tremadoc / Lower Ordovician)
- Romaniella (Arenig / late Lower Ordovician)
- Moyerokania (Arenig / late Lower Ordovician)
- Angarella (Arenig / late Lower Ordovician)
- Pygmaeoconus (Llanvirn / early Middle Ordovician)
