= Megasporoporia minuta =

Scientific classification
- Domain: Eukaryota
- Kingdom: Fungi
- Division: Basidiomycota
- Class: Agaricomycetes
- Order: Polyporales
- Family: Polyporaceae
- Genus: Megasporoporia
- Species: M. minuta

Binomial name
- Megasporoporia minuta Y.C.Dai & X.S.Zhou (2013)

Species of fungus

Megasporoporia minuta is a species of crust fungus in the family Polyporaceae. Found in the Guangxi Autonomous Region of southern China, it was described as a new species in 2008 by mycologists Xu-Shen Zhou and Yu-Cheng Dai. The fungus produces annual to biennial fruit bodies with small pores, numbering 6–8 per millimetre. The spores are cylindrical to oblong-ellipsoid and measure 7.7–9.7 by 3.6–4.9 μm. The hymenium lacks both hyphal pegs and dendrohyphidia.
