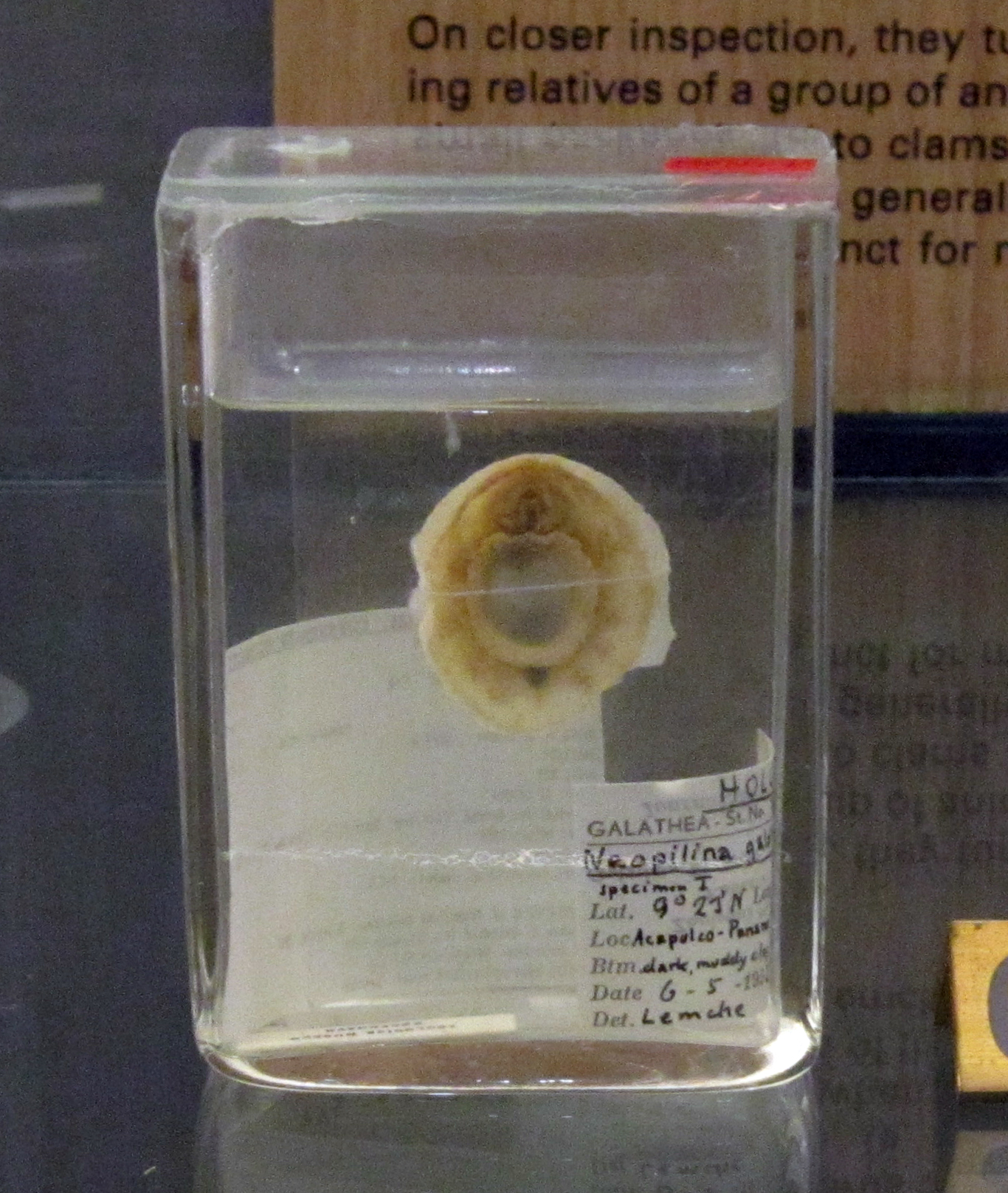
- The holotype of N. galatheae at the Zoological Museum, Copenhagen

Scientific classification
- Kingdom: Animalia
- Phylum: Mollusca
- Class: Monoplacophora
- Order: Neopilinida
- Family: Neopilinidae
- Genus: Neopilina; Lemche, 1957

Species
- 4 species (see text)

= Neopilina =

Genus of molluscs

Neopilina is a highly derived genus of modern monoplacophoran.

== Species ==
Four species are recognized:

- Neopilina bruuni Menzies, 1968
- Neopilina galatheae Lemche, 1957
- Neopilina rebainsi Moskalev, Starobogatov & Filatova, 1983
- Neopilina starobogatovi Ivanov & Moskalev, 2007

== Phylogeny ==
Some molecular results show that they fall within the polyplacophoran clade, although these results have been called into question. Fossil and morphological data show that they are rather derived and bear very little resemblance to an 'ancestral mollusc'.

== Anatomy ==
Its anatomy led researchers to believe that the cephalopods evolved from the Monoplacophora.

Its pair of preoral tentacles are considered homologous to those of gastropods; like prosobranch gastropod tentacles, their nerves connect to the cerebral ganglia. The post-oral tentacles are equated with bivalves' labial flaps, cephalopods' arms, and scaphopods' captacula.

Cuticular hardenings around the mouth of the organism are considered to be jaw-like and not far removed from the beaks of cephalopods or the jaws of many gastropods.

The presence of a single shell prompts comparisons to the cephalopod Nautilus, but besides its bilateral symmetry and direction of coiling, there is not a clear equivalence; Nautilus' shell is notably different in the possession of septa (and thus a siphuncle). It bears a similar degree of similarity to most other mollusc groups, leading to speculation that it may reflect a relatively unchanged ancestral mollusc. The shell itself is aragonitic, consisting mainly of a prismatic layer, lined with nacre.

The organism bears five pairs of ctenidia (gills), unusually for molluscs; the rear two are homologous to the two pairs in Nautilus. This is unlike the Polyplacophora (chitons), which have a number of pairs of ctenidia, but this number varies and is not related to the number of their body 'segments'.

The foot and pallial groove are very difficult indeed to discriminate from the polyplacophora, supporting its placement in this group by molecular methods

Its radula is not unlike that of the polyplacophora; notably, its fifth tooth is modified to be comb-like.

== Ecology ==
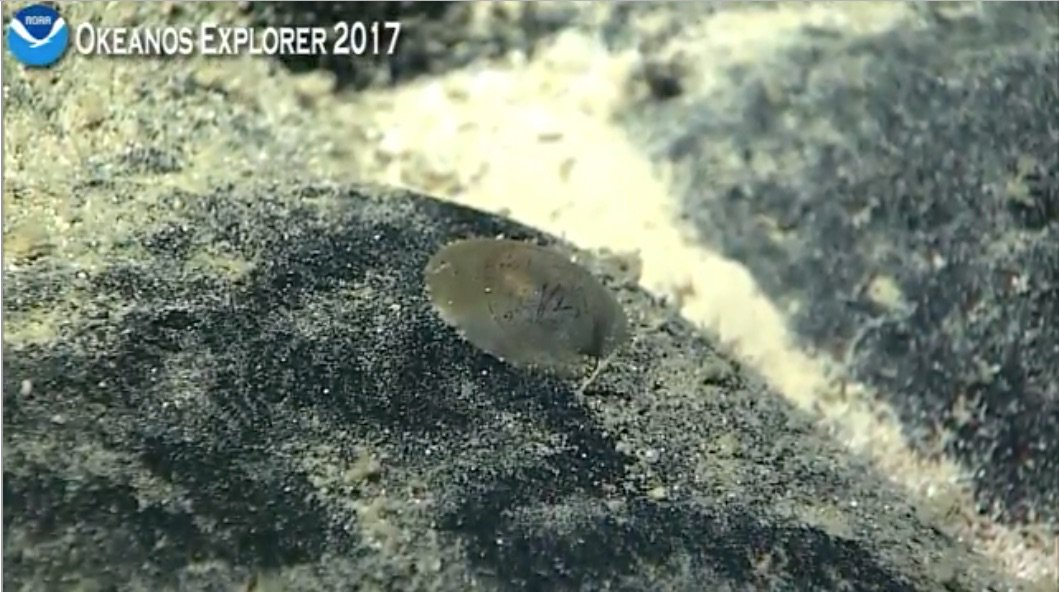
Video footage screenshot of Neopilina sp., from the 2017 Okeanos Explorer American Samoa expedition

Neopilina is a bottom feeder, probably a deposit feeder; whilst alive, its shell is covered by a layer of mucus that might be involved in feeding or locomotion.

In 2017, a deep-sea expedition by the Okeanos Explorer off the coast of American Samoa filmed the first-ever high-resolution video of a monoplacophoran in its natural habitat. Two Neopilina sp. individuals were filmed on the ocean floor. The individuals may belong to an undescribed species, with five pairs of long gills clearly visible.
