= Mimozotale minuta =

Scientific classification
- Kingdom: Animalia
- Phylum: Arthropoda
- Class: Insecta
- Order: Coleoptera
- Suborder: Polyphaga
- Infraorder: Cucujiformia
- Family: Cerambycidae
- Genus: Mimozotale
- Species: M. minuta

Binomial name
- Mimozotale minuta (Pic, 1926)

Species of beetle

Mimozotale minuta is a species of beetle in the family Cerambycidae. It was described by Pic in 1926. It is known from Vietnam.
