= Micropilina =

Micropilina Temporal range: Pleistocene–Recent

Scientific classification
- Kingdom: Animalia
- Phylum: Mollusca
- Class: Monoplacophora
- Order: Tryblidiida
- Superfamily: Tryblidioidea
- Family: Micropilinidae; Haszprunar & Schaefer, 1997
- Genus: Micropilina; Warén, 1989

Genus of molluscs

Diagram of the internal anatomy of Micropilina

Micropilina is a genus of monoplacophoran molluscs. They are very small, mostly deepwater animals which have a superficially limpet-like shell.

In addition to a number of living, deep-sea species, this genus also includes a shallow water fossil from the middle Pleistocene of Italy - and this is the only fossil representative of this lineage subsequent to the Devonian period.

All currently known Micropilina species are less than 1.5 mm in length. Except for Micropilina minuta, they are all found in the Southern Hemisphere.

== Species ==
Species in the genus Micropilina include:

Recent species:

- Micropilina arntzi Warén & Hain, 1992
- Micropilina minuta Warén, 1989
- Micropilina rakiura Marshall, 1998
- Micropilina reingi Marshall, 2006
- Micropilina tangaroa Marshall, 1992
- Micropilina wareni Marshall, 2006

Fossil species:
