= Minutargyrotoza minuta =

Scientific classification
- Domain: Eukaryota
- Kingdom: Animalia
- Phylum: Arthropoda
- Class: Insecta
- Order: Lepidoptera
- Family: Tortricidae
- Genus: Minutargyrotoza
- Species: M. minuta

Binomial name
- Minutargyrotoza minuta (Walsingham, 1900)

Synonyms
- Capua minuta Walsingham, 1900; Pseudargyrotoza minuta; Pternozyga minutana Issiki, in Esaki et al., 1957

Species of moth

Minutargyrotoza minuta is a species of moth of the family Tortricidae. It is found in Japan on the islands of Hokkaido, Honshu, Shikoku and Kyushu.

The wingspan is about 13.5 mm. Adults are on wing from the beginning of April to mid-June.
