= Megasporoporia =

Scientific classification
- Domain: Eukaryota
- Kingdom: Fungi
- Division: Basidiomycota
- Class: Agaricomycetes
- Order: Polyporales
- Family: Polyporaceae
- Genus: Megasporoporia; Ryvarden & J.E.Wright (1982)

Type species
- Megasporoporia setulosa (Henn.) Rajchenb. (1982)

Species
- M. bannaensis M. minor M. minuta M. setulosa

Genus of fungi

Megasporoporia is a genus of four species of crust fungi in the family Polyporaceae. The genus is characterized by its large spores (after which it is named), and dextrinoid skeletal hyphae.

== Taxonomy ==
The genus was circumscribed by mycologists Leif Ryvarden and Jorge Eduardo Wright in 1982, with Poria setulosa as the type species. They included an additional three species: the new combinations M. cavernulosa and M. hexagonoides, and the new species M. mexicana. Six new species of Megasporoporia were introduced by Chinese mycologists between 2004 and 2009 as a result of taxonomic studies of wood-inhabiting fungi in China.

Molecular analysis showed that Megasporoporia nested within the "core polyporoid clade", a grouping of polypore fungi roughly equivalent to a more narrowed but still broad concept of the family Polyporaceae. Later analysis that included the more recently described Chinese species revealed that the genus was not monophyletic and could be divided into four clades. In 2013, two of these monophyletic clades were segregated from Megasporoporia and circumscribed as the new genera Megasporia and Megasporoporiella.

== Description ==
Megasporoporia have crust-like fruit bodies, with large or small pores, and spores that are typically greater than 10 μm long. It features a dimitic hyphal system with clamped generative hyphae and dextrinoid skeletal hyphae. Characters that can be absent or present in the hymenium include small rhomboid or bipyramidic crystals, dendrohyphidia, hyphal pegs, and cystidioles or cystidia. Megasporoporia mainly occurs on angiosperm branches, causing a white rot.

== Species ==
- Megasporoporia bannaensis B.K.Cui & Hai J.Li (2013)
- Megasporoporia minor B.K.Cui & Hai J.Li (2013)
- Megasporoporia minuta Y.C.Dai & X.S.Zhou (2008)
- Megasporoporia setulosa (Henn.) Rajchenb. (1982)

Megasporoporia setulosa has a pantropical distribution, while the other three species are found in China.

Several species once placed in Megasporoporia have since been transferred to other genera:

- M. cavernulosa (Berk.) Ryvarden (1982) = Megasporoporiella cavernulosa (Berk.) B.K.Cui, Y.C.Dai & Hai J.Li (2013)
- M. cystidiolophora B.K.Cui & Y.C.Dai (2007) = Megasporia cystidiolophora (B.K.Cui & Y.C.Dai) B.K.Cui & Hai J.Li (2013)
- M. ellipsoidea B.K.Cui & P.Du (2009) = Megasporia ellipsoidea (B.K.Cui & P.Du) B.K.Cui & Hai J.Li (2013)
- M. hexagonoides (Speg.) J.E.Wright & Rajchenb. (1982) = Megasporia hexagonoides (Speg.) B.K.Cui, Y.C.Dai & Hai J.Li (2013)
- M. major (G.Y.Zheng & Z.S.Bi) Y.C.Dai & T.H.Li (2002) = Megasporia major (G.Y.Zheng & Z.S.Bi) B.K.Cui, Y.C.Dai & Hai J.Li (2013)
- M. mexicana Ryvarden (1982) = Dichomitus mexicanus (Ryvarden) Ryvarden (2007)
- M. quercina Y.C.Dai (2004) = Grammothele quercina (Y.C.Dai) B.K.Cui & Hai J.Li (2013)
- M. rhododendri Y.C.Dai & Y.L.Wei (2004) = Megasporoporiella rhododendri (Y.C.Dai & Y.L.Wei) B.K.Cui & Hai J.Li (2013)
- M. subcavernulosa Y.C.Dai & Sheng H.Wu (2004) = Megasporoporiella subcavernulosa (Y.C.Dai & Sheng H.Wu) B.K.Cui & Hai J.Li (2013)
- M. violacea B.K.Cui & P.Du (2009) = Megasporia violacea (B.K.Cui & P.Du) B.K.Cui, Y.C.Dai & Hai J.Li (2013)
