= Oesophageal pouch =

Anatomical feature in molluscs

The oesophageal pouches (also known as sugar glands) are a pair of pouches connected to the oesophagus of all molluscs, and represent a synapomorphy of the phylum.

== Morphology ==
Usually forming a pair of lateral structures, oesophageal pouches take various forms, but usually account for a fair portion of the anterior volume of the creeping molluscs and scaphopods. There is a single pouch ventral to the rear of the radula in some nudibranch sea slugs. The pouches are lined with ciliated secretory cells.

== Function ==
The pouches contain digestive enzymes that break down starch and other polysaccharides, and also extrude mucus.

== Occurrence ==
The features are considered ancestral to molluscs and are present in monoplacophorans, but have been secondarily lost in the Heterobranchia. However, it is not certain that all oesophageal diverticulae are homologous.
