= Style (zoology) =

Rod made of glycoprotein located in the midgut of most bivalves and some gastropods

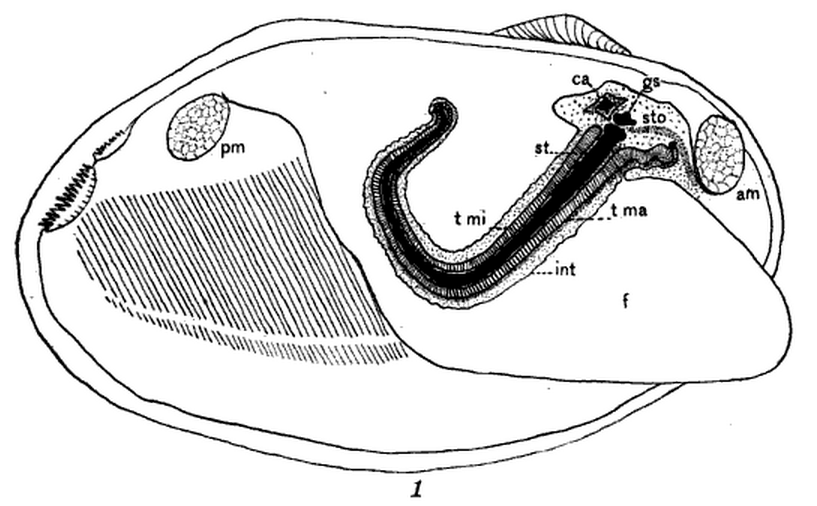
Mussel of the genus Anodonta, with style ("st") shown in black

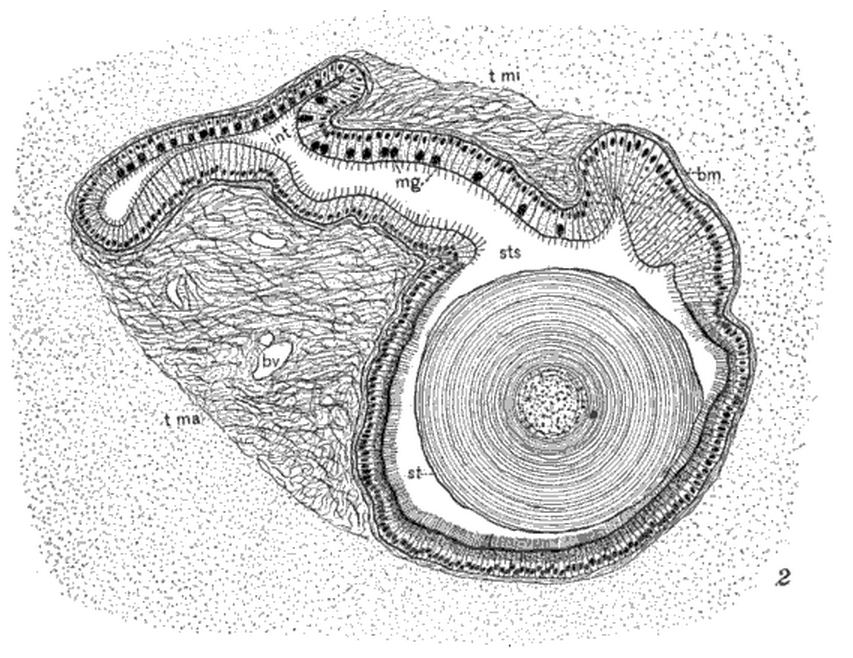
Mussel of the genus Lampsilis, with style ("st") shown in cross-section

A style, sometimes referred to as a crystalline style, is a rod made of glycoprotein located in the midgut of most bivalves and some gastropods which aids in extracellular digestion. It consists of a protein matrix coated with digestive enzymes secreted by the style sac in the animal's stomach. When feeding, its projecting end is scraped against the stomach wall and abraded, thus releasing the enzymes.

When subjected to starvation or desiccation, some bivalves have been known to re-ingest this organ.
