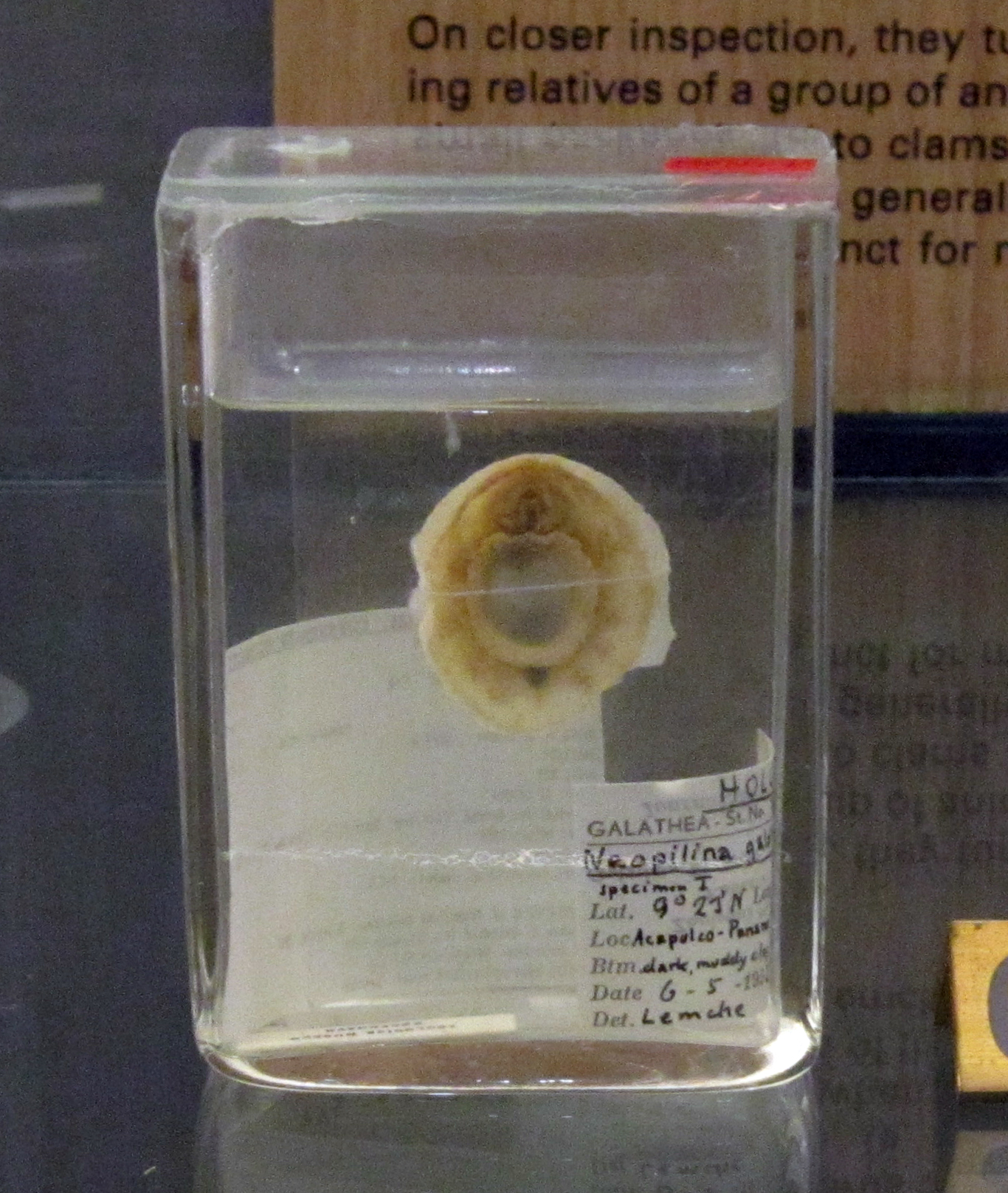
- The holotype of Neopilina galatheae at the Zoological Museum, Copenhagen

Scientific classification
- Kingdom: Animalia
- Phylum: Mollusca
- Subphylum: Conchifera
- Class: Monoplacophora; Odhner, 1940

= Monoplacophora =

Monoplacophora Temporal range: Early Cambrian – Recent

Class of molluscs

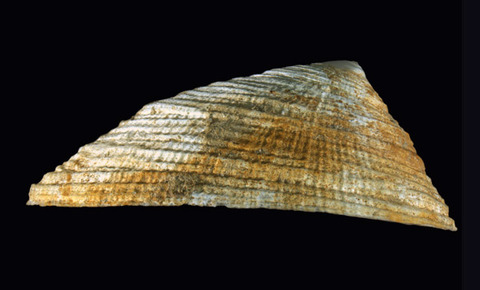
Shell of Monoplacophora

Monoplacophora /ˌmɒnoʊpləˈkɒfərə/, meaning "bearing one plate", is a paraphyletic class of molluscs with a cap-like shell, inhabiting deep sea environments. Extant representatives were not recognized as such until 1952; previously they were known only from the fossil record, and were thought to have become extinct 375 million years ago.

Although the shell of many monoplacophorans is limpet-like in shape, they are not gastropods, nor do they have any close relation to gastropods.

== Definition ==
Discussion about monoplacophorans is made difficult by the slippery definition of the taxon; some authors take it to refer to all non-gastropod molluscs with a single shell, or all single-shelled molluscs with serially repeated units; whereas other workers restrict the definition to cap-shaped forms, excluding spiral and other shapes of shell. The inclusion of the gastropod-like Bellerophontoidea within the group is also contentious.

One attempt to resolve this confusion was to separate out the predominantly coiled helcionelloids from the traditional, cap-like tergomyans, this latter group containing extant Tryblidiids.

== Taxonomy ==
Taxonomy of Monoplacophora per Bouchet, et al. (2017):

Class Monoplacophora

- † Subclass Cyrtolitiones
  - † Order Sinuitopsida
    - † Superfamily Cyrtolitoidea S. A. Miller, 1889
      - † Family Cyrtolitidae S. A. Miller, 1889
      - † Family Carcassonnellidae Horný, 1997
    - † Superfamily Cyclocyrtonelloidea Horný, 1962
      - † Family Cyclocyrtonellidae Horný, 1962 (= Yochelsoniidae Horný, 1962 (inv.))
      - † Family Multifariitidae Bjaly, 1973
      - † Family Sinuellidae Starobogatov & Moskalev, 1987
      - † Family Sinuitinidae Starobogatov & Moskalev, 1987
- † Subclass Cyrtonelliones
  - † Order Cyrtonellida
    - † Superfamily Cyrtonelloidea Knight & Yochelson, 1958
      - † Family Cyrtonellidae Knight & Yochelson, 1958 (= Cyrtonellopsinae Horný, 1965)
- † Subclass Eomonoplacophora
  - (Unassigned to Order)
    - † Superfamily Maikhanelloidea Missarzhevsky, 1989
      - † Family Maikhanellidae Missarzhevsky, 1989 (= Purellidae Vassiljeva, 1990)
- Subclass Tergomya (= Pilinea)
  - † Order Kirengellida (= Romaniellida)
    - † Superfamily Archaeophialoidea Knight & Yochelson, 1958
      - † Family Archaeophialidae Knight & Yochelson, 1958
      - † Family Peelipilinidae Horný, 2006
      - † Family Pygmaeoconidae Horný, 2006
    - † Superfamily Kirengelloidea Starobogatov, 1970
      - † Family Kirengellidae Starobogatov, 1970
      - † Family Romaniellidae Rozov, 1975
      - † Family Nyuellidae Starobogatov & Moskalev, 1987
    - † Superfamily Hypseloconoidea Knight, 1952
      - † Family Hypseloconidae Knight, 1952
  - Order Tryblidiida
    - Superfamily Tryblidioidea Pilsbry, 1899
      - † Family Tryblidiidae Pilsbry, 1899
      - † Family Proplinidae Knight & Yochelson, 1958
      - † Family Drahomiridae Knight & Yochelson, 1958
      - † Family Bipulvinidae Starobogatov, 1970
    - Superfamily Neopilinoidea Knight & Yochelson, 1958
      - Family Neopilinidae Knight & Yochelson, 1958
        - Subfamily Neopilininae Knight & Yochelson, 1958 (= Vemidae Moskalev, Starobogatov & Filatova, 1983; = Laevipilinidae Moskalev, Starobogatov & Filatova, 1983; = Monoplacophoridae Moskalev, Starobogatov & Filatova, 1983)
        - Subfamily Veleropilininae Starobogatov & Moskalev, 1987 (= Rokopellidae Starobogatov & Moskalev, 1987; = Micropilinidae Haszprunar & Schaefer, 1997)

== Anatomy and physiology ==
Internal anatomy of Micropilina. The head region is on the left by the mouth.

Monoplacophorans are univalved (though not gastropodal), limpet-shaped, and are untorted. They have a pseudometamerism of bilaterally symmetrical repeated organs and muscles. The extant members of the class live only in the deep ocean (the abyssal zone, the continental shelf, and the continental slope) at depths below 180 metres (590 ft). Cambrian forms predominately lived in shallow seas, whereas later Paleozoic forms are more commonly found in deeper waters with soft, muddy sea floors.

Although superficially resembling limpets when viewed dorsally, monoplacophorans are not anatomically similar to gastropods. Some similarities are shared with the chitons, such as having segmented anatomy (organs arranged in series). There are eight pairs of dorso-ventral muscles (shell muscles). The nervous system is relatively simple, with no true ganglion present.

The repeated organs include from three to six pairs of "gills" (actually ctenidia) located in a curved line along each side of the foot (though the number is not always considered definitive of a given species), and as many as six "kidneys" (actually nephridia). The tip or point of their low shells points forward rather than towards the back. The shell ranges from 3 mm to 37 mm in diameter depending on species. Like in chitons, the head is poorly defined, and there are no eyes. The mouth is located within the animal's undeveloped head in front of its single large foot and contains a radula, a defining characteristic of the mollusca. Tentacles are situated behind the mouth. They also have a cone-shaped stomach with a single crystalline style though no gastric shield. The intestines are long and make between four and six loops before reaching the posteriorly-positioned anus. Monoplacophorans also have oesophageal pouches.

The sexes are separate with any given animal having two pairs of either ovaries or testes connected to either the third or fourth pair of kidneys. One genus, Micropilina, has apparently been recorded as brooding young in the distal oviduct and pallial groove, releasing the young when approximately 300 micrometers in diameter.

== Phylogenetic position ==
In 2006 a molecular study on Laevipilina antarctica suggested that extant Monoplacophora and Polyplacophora form a well-supported clade with the researched Neopilina closest to the chitons. The two classes in this new clade, with the proposed name Serialia, all show a variable number of serially repeated gills and eight sets of dorsoventral pedal retractor muscles.

This study contradicts the fossil evidence, which suggests that the Monoplacophora are the sister group to the remainder of the conchiferans, and that the cephalopods (squids, octopuses, and relatives) arose from within the monoplacophoran lineage. However, some authors dispute this view and do not necessarily see modern Monoplacophora as related to their presumed fossil ancestors.

The concept of Serialia is supported by other molecular studies.

The fossil record does indicate that the ancestral mollusc was monoplacophoran-like and that the Polyplacophora arose from within the Monoplacophora – not the other way around. This could be reconciled if a secondary loss of shells caused a monoplacophoran body form to re-appear secondarily, which is plausible: At the very least, modern monoplacophorans are not closely related to vent-dwelling representatives from the Silurian.

Cambrian monoplacophoran Knightoconus antarcticus is hypothesised to be an ancestor to the cephalopods.

== Fossil species ==
Living families:

- Tryblidiida
  - Laevipilinidae
  - Micropilinidae
  - Monoplacophoridae
  - Neopilinidae

Extinct families:

- Tryblidiida
  - † Tryblidiidae von Zittel, 1899
- † Palaeacmaeidae (uncertain, as the Cambrian type species is a cnidarian. It is maintained here as a receptacle for the Paleozoic genus Parmophorella)
  - † Palaeacmaea Hall & Whitfield, 1872
  - † Parmophorella Matthew, 1886
  - † Knightoconus
    - † Knightoconus antarcticus

Many Cambrian-Devonian species have been described as "monoplacophorans", but the only fossil members of the crown group date to the Pleistocene.

The Taxonomy of the Gastropoda (Bouchet & Rocroi, 2005) (Note: Bouchet, P.; Rocroi, J.-P., eds. (2005b). Classification and nomenclator of gastropod families. Hackenheim, Germany: ConchBooks. ISBN 3-925919-72-4. Bouchet, P.; Rocroi, J. -P (2005). "(online data ref)". Malacologia: International Journal of Malacology (1–2). reprinted from Bouchet & Rocroi (2005a)) also contains Paleozoic molluscs of uncertain systematic position. It is not known whether these were gastropods or monoplacophorans.
